= Guadalupe Valley Creek =

Guadalupe Valley Creek Cañada de Guadalupe

Location
- Country: United States
- State: California
- Region: San Mateo County
- City: Brisbane

Physical characteristics
- Source: San Bruno Mountain
  - location: San Mateo County, California
  - coordinates: 37°41′37″N 122°25′36″W
  - elevation: 980 ft (300 m)
- Mouth: Brisbane Lagoon
  - location: Brisbane, California
  - coordinates: 37°41′14″N 122°23′54″W
  - elevation: 20 ft (6.1 m)

Basin features
- Tributaries
  - left: Wax Myrtle Ravine
  - right: Devil's Arroyo, Owl Canyon, Buckeye Canyon

Guadalupe Creek or Guadalupe Valley Creek is a short eastward-flowing stream whose watershed originates just east of the highest peak of San Bruno Mountain in San Mateo County, California, United States. It courses through San Bruno Mountain State and County Park and Brisbane before entering the Brisbane Lagoon.

== History ==
Guadalupe Valley was originally called Cañada de Guadalupe, and was part of the Rancho Cañada de Guadalupe la Visitación y Rodeo Viejo land grant awarded by General Mariano Guadalupe Vallejo to his brother-in-law, Jacob P. Leese in 1841. Prior to this Manuel Sanchez had petitioned for the rancho of this name in 1835.

== Watershed and course ==
=== Bay watershed ===
The Guadalupe Creek watershed begins on the northeast-facing slope of the peak of San Bruno Mountain as Devil's Arroyo, which descends quickly northwards to the head of the Guadalupe Valley. The confluence of Devil's Arroyo and Wax Myrtle Ravine is at the head of the Guadalupe Valley at elevation 200 feet, where the Guadalupe Creek mainstem flows eastward largely confined to underground pipes and ditches, emerging to daylight just east of Bayshore Boulevard. From there it flows for a few dozen yards to its mouth in Brisbane Lagoon. This lagoon is a remnant of San Francisco Bay, formed by the construction of the U. S. Highway 101 causeway, and became diminished when its north and central portions (which are now crossed by Visitacion Creek) were filled with garbage and landfill. Seasonal creeks which contribute to the Guadalupe Creek watershed include Owl Canyon and Buckeye Canyon. After passing into the lagoon, the waters of the Guadalupe Valley watershed pass through a culvert under the freeway into the Bay.

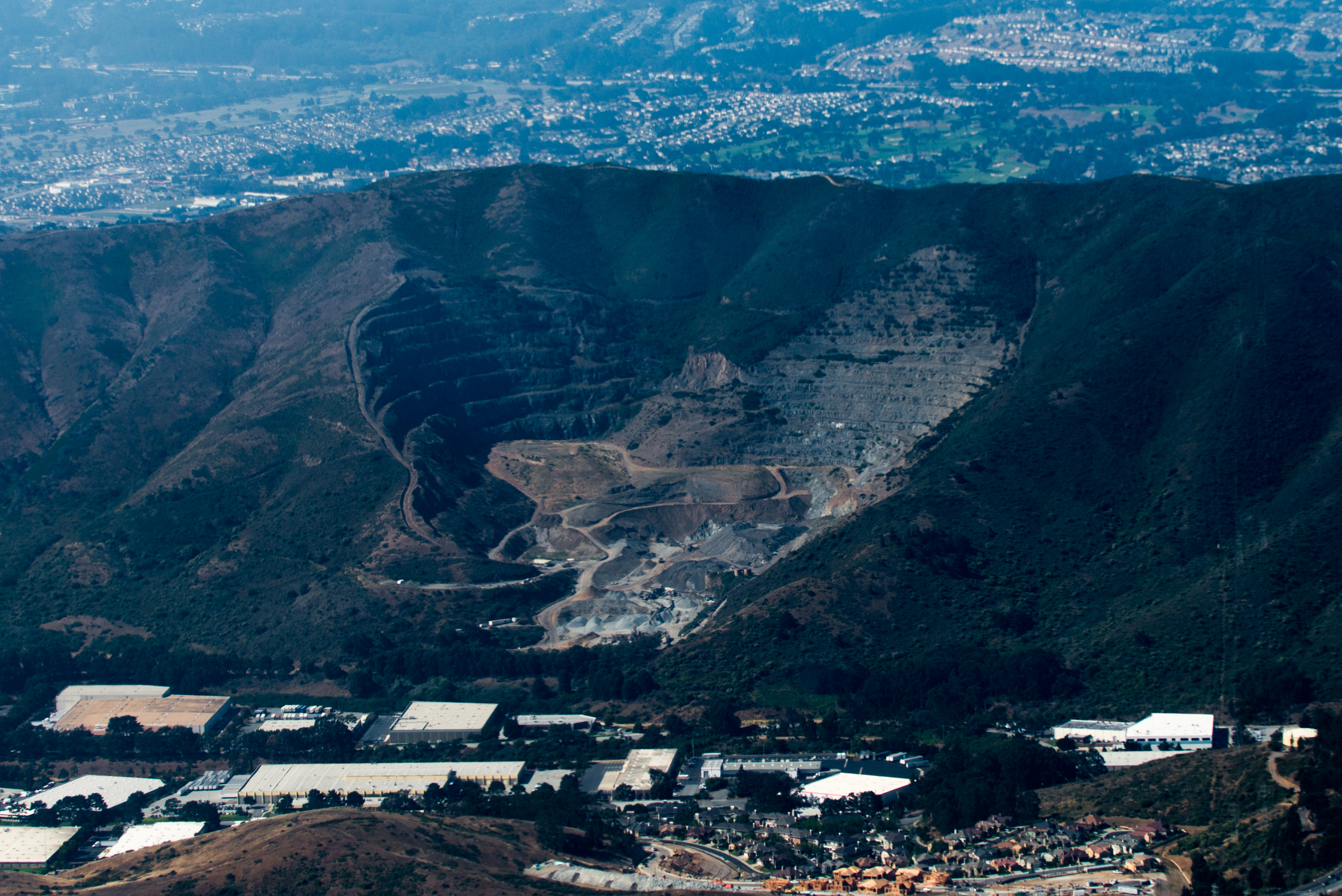
Aerial view of Guadalupe Quarry, located in Brisbane, California

=== Visitacion-Guadalupe Valley ===
Guadalupe Creek is part of the Visitacion-Guadalupe Valley Watershed, which is a large bowl straddling San Francisco and San Mateo Counties. It drains the area bounded by Bayview Hill (by Candlestick Park), McLaren Ridge and San Bruno Mountain. The mountain's highest peak reaches 1,314 feet, Bayview Hill's summit is 500 feet, and the highest summit of McLaren Ridge is 515 feet.

=== Guadalupe Quarry ===
The Guadalupe Quarry is carved into the northeastern-facing slope of San Bruno Mountain on the south side of the Guadalupe Valley. It's located in the city of Brisbane, California.

== Ecology ==
San Bruno Mountain hosts several endangered species and the Guadalupe Valley provides habitat for the Mission blue (Aricia icarioides missionensis), elfin (Callophrys mossii bayensis) and callippe silverspot (Speyeria callippe callippe) butterflies, as well as the San Francisco garter snake (Thamnophis sirtalis tetrataenia).

== See also ==
- Brisbane, California
- List of watercourses in the San Francisco Bay Area
- Permanente Quarry
- Rancho Cañada de Guadalupe la Visitación y Rodeo Viejo
- Rockaway Quarry
