= Mission blue butterfly habitat conservation =

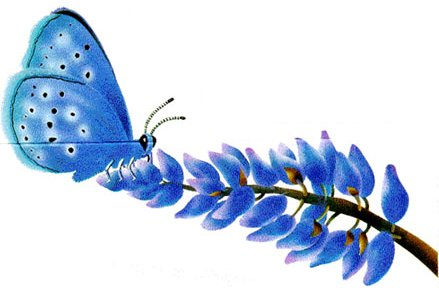
An artist's rendering of a Mission blue perched upon a lupine

The U.S. Fish and Wildlife Service (USFWS) has a number of programs aimed at Mission blue butterfly habitat conservation, which include lands traditionally inhabited by the Mission blue butterfly, an endangered species. A recovery plan, drawn up by the U.S. Fish and Wildlife Service in 1984, outlined the need to protect Mission blue habitat and to repair habitat damaged by urbanization, off highway vehicle traffic, and invasion by exotic, non-native plants. An example of the type of work being done by governmental and citizen agencies can be found at the Marin Headlands in the Golden Gate National Recreation Area. In addition, regular wildfires have opened new habitat conservation opportunities as well as damaging existing ones.

== Marin Headlands ==
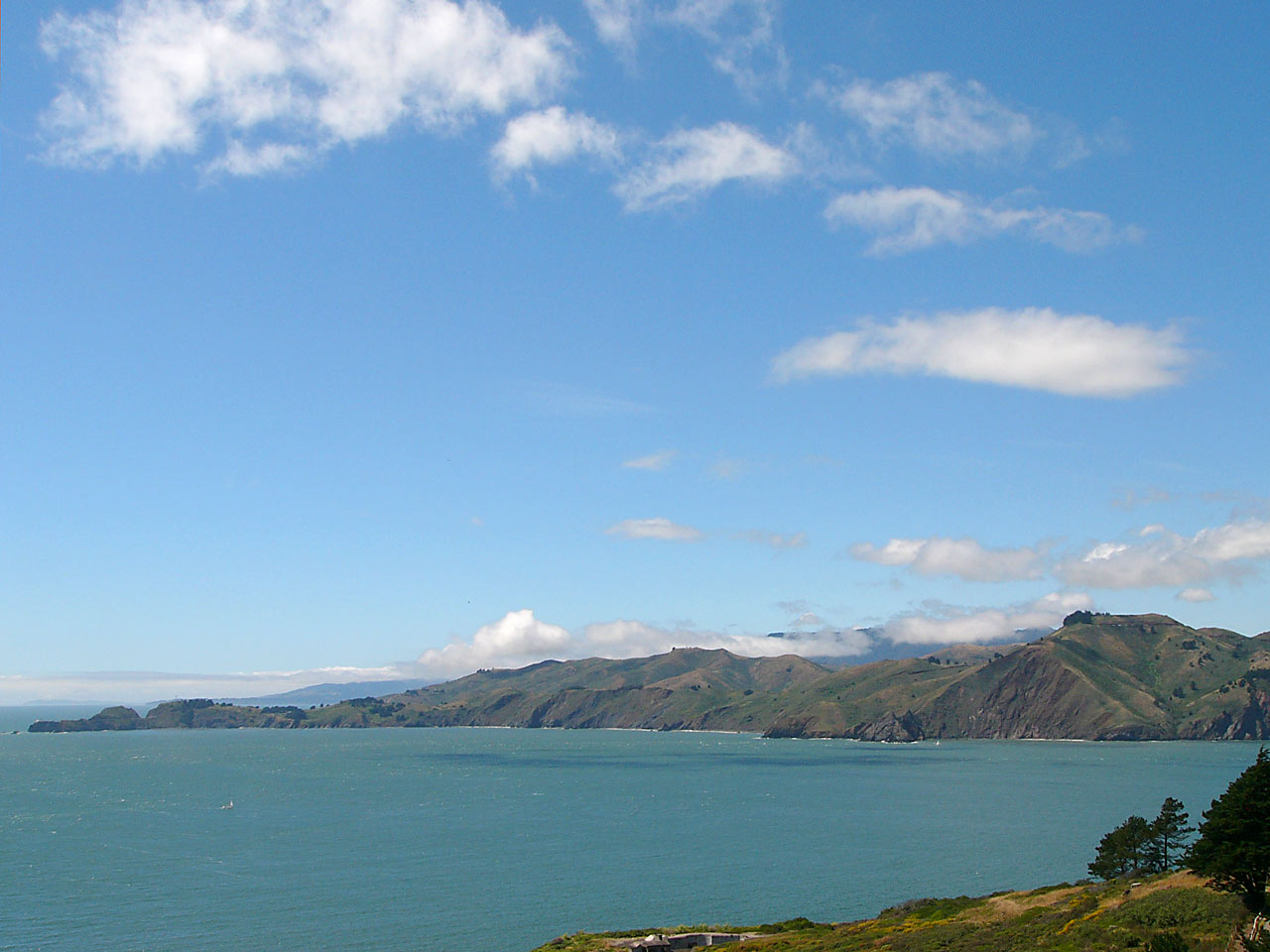
The Marin Headlands from Immigrant Point Overlook

The program at the Marin Headlands for Mission blue butterfly habitat protection aims to deal with one of the main problems facing the Mission blue butterfly population. The Headlands area was once owned by the U.S. Army. From 1870 on, the Army used the area for forts such as Fort Cronkhite, coastal batteries such as those that protected the San Francisco Bay during WW II, and missile sites, such as the 280 that occupied the area during the Cold War. While in the Marin Headlands, the Army planted a lot of trees, so many that today the non-native, invasive species that occupy the Headlands threaten the habitat of the Mission blue butterfly. The habitat protection program seeks to root out these species from selected areas of the Marin Headlands. Some of the species that threaten the habitat of the endangered Mission blue butterfly include blue gum eucalyptus, Monterey cypress, Monterey pine and blackwood acacia. The Mission Blue Butterfly UserFee Project in the headlands will try to remove these species and revegetate the area with native coastal prairie plants.

== San Bruno Mountain ==
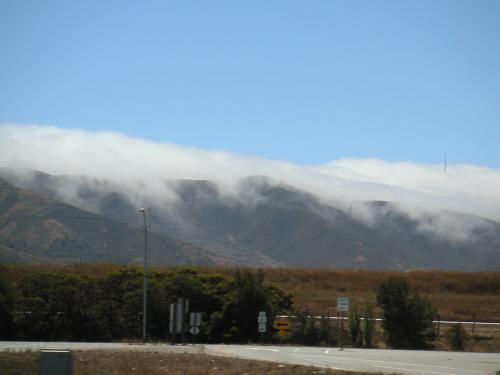
Fog coming off of San Bruno Mountain

Another major conservation effort is underway at San Bruno Mountain. A large area of Mission blue butterfly habitat has been protected under the auspices of the U.S. Fish and Wildlife Service. In all, the San Bruno Mountain habitat conservation program has protected over 3,500 acres (14 km^{2}) of habitat since 1983. San Bruno Mountain was the site of the nation's first Habitat Conservation Plan (HCP), intended to protect the habitat of the Mission blue butterfly. However HCPs remain controversial.

The controversy over HCPs lie in their implementation. The San Bruno HCP came about in 1982. By that year local residents had created San Bruno Mountain State and County Park, which held 1,950 acres (7.9 km^{2}) of the 3,600 on the mountain, in order to protect the habitat of the Mission blue butterfly. Then, the butterfly began to turn up on private land. The U.S. Fish and Wildlife Service formed a committee with landowners, developers, local governments, the California Department of Fish and Game, and others to craft the first HCP in 1982 "to address problems caused by the presence of endangered butterflies on San Bruno Mountain." HCPs do not include any independent scientific review, thus none exists. The plan became the model for the 1983 amendment to the Endangered Species Act.

HCPs work like this. In exchange for permission to build over the top of the prime habitat of two California endangered butterflies, the Mission blue and the San Bruno elfin butterfly, landowners agreed to measures to improve the prospects for the species' survival in other locations. This particular HCP allowed the development of 368 acres (1.49 km^{2}) to 828 acres (3.35 km^{2}). Property owners who located in this area were required to offer land and funds to conserve and improve habitat in other locales around San Bruno Mountain. Property holders are also assessed for a Habitat Conservation Trust Fund which pays for species monitoring, alien plant removal and other tasks on the "donated" land slated for habitat. One such area on San Bruno Mountain was along the northeast ridge. There, a residential community was built over prime Mission blue habitat, a habitat that was supposed to be restored on the saddle of the mountain. However, the mountain's saddle is colder, damper and windier. On top of this, the saddle is overgrown with an invasive species, gorse, while the Mission blue requires lupine as its host plant.

The environmental consulting firm, Thomas Reid Associates (TRA) crafted the plan and work to carry out the HCPs biological program and monitors the results. In addition, they have conducted the biological studies and environmental impact studies required under the HCP. TRA works with others to stop exotic plant invasions on butterfly habitat and began to undertake the daunting task of replacing the gorse infested saddle with lupine for the butterflies to relocate to. The project started in 1985. Gorse is a hardy plant that can reach heights of 20 feet (6.1 m) with deep root systems. TRA tried multiple methods to destroy the invasive species, including herbicides and burning. By April the unfazed gorse bloomed a bright yellow. In 2001, 16 years after the project began, 100 acres (0.40 km^{2}) of 330 original-acres remained covered in gorse.

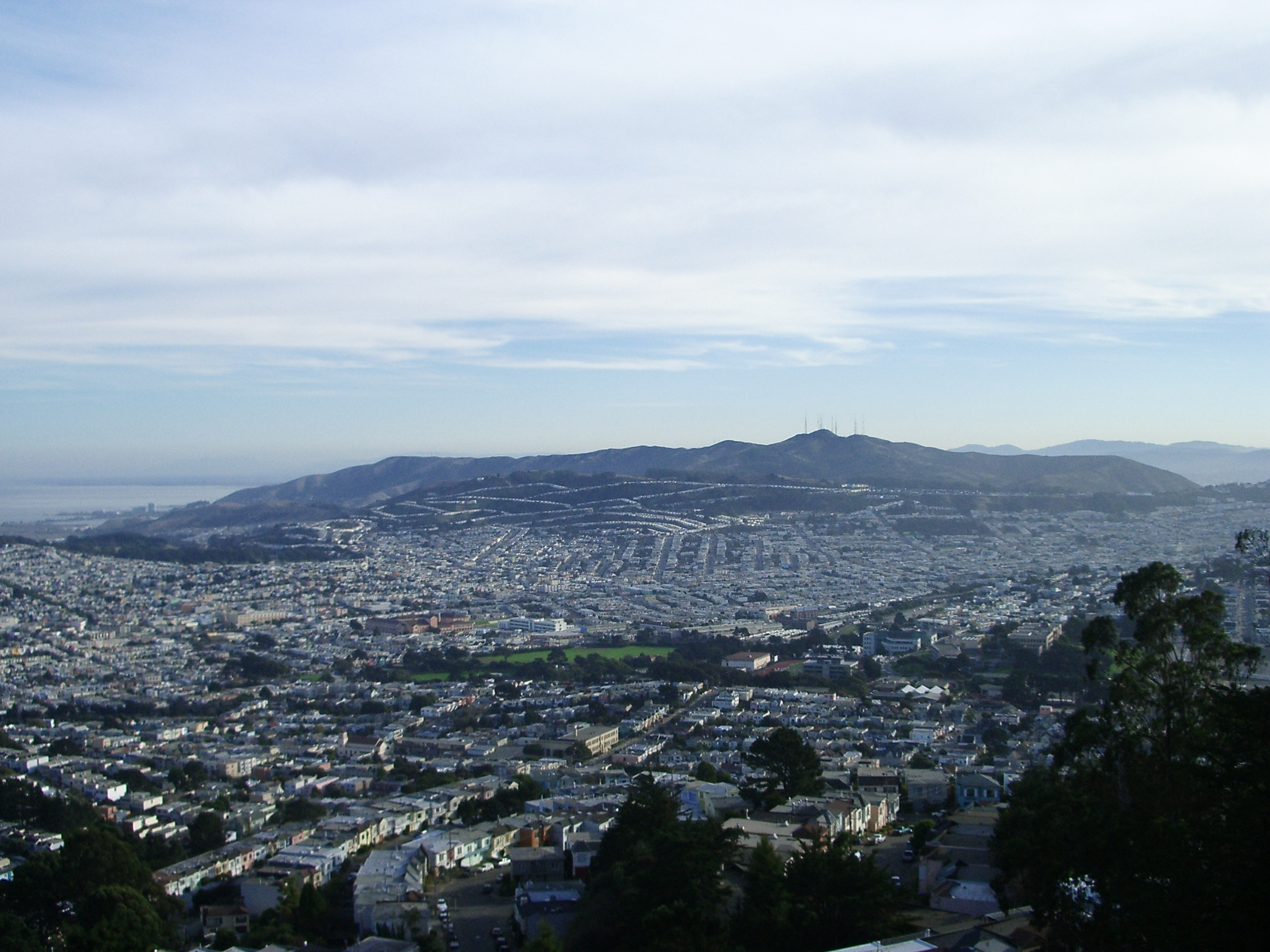
San Bruno Mountain, viewed from San Francisco's Mount Davidson to the north, with the Sunnyside, Balboa Park, Excelsior and Crocker Amazon neighborhoods in the foreground.

The Sacramento Fish and Wildlife Office is in charge of the plats under conservation at San Bruno Mountain and Parkside Homes. Parkside Homes is the newest habitat conservation plan or agreement and involves a twenty-five acre residential community in South San Francisco. The area is home to non-native and native species which include lupines, sedum, and viola. The permit was issued in 1996.

The original conservation permit for San Bruno Mountain was issued in 1983 and encompassed 3,500 acres (14 km^{2}) of mixed use land in San Mateo County. The Mission blue is among other endangered species in the 1983 parcel of land. Other animals include the San Bruno elfin butterfly, and the San Francisco garter snake. At the end of 1985, another 203 acres (0.82 km^{2}) of land came under the auspices of the Sacramento office. The area, known as "South Slope" is another mixed use area. Three other amendments to the San Bruno Mountain conservation agreement added 10, 19, and 227 acres (0.92 km^{2}) in 1985, 1986 and 1990, respectively.

== Fort Baker ==
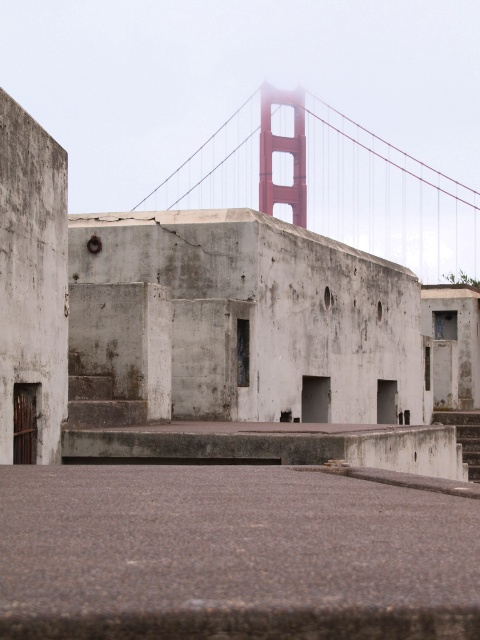
Abandoned buildings at Fort Baker are dwarfed by the Golden Gate Bridge.

Fort Baker is an abandoned base formerly occupied by the U.S. Army. It is near the city of Sausalito, California. The military announced the post's closure in 1995. By 2001, it had been ceded to the National Park Service.

An 8 1/4 acres (3.3 ha) area of non-native Monterey pine and tea trees are invading part of a habitat at Fort Baker. The Fort Baker area is a "top vegetation and wildlife management priority" for the Golden Gate National Recreation Area. As part of the mission to protect Mission blue habitat the project will seek to physically remove and/or contain those species in areas within or adjacent to the "host plant" Lupinus albifrons. Upon completion, the area will be completely invasive-tree free.

A pitched legal battle was waged for years over the fate of some of the Fort Baker lands, the players: the city of Sausalito, California, and the National Park Service (NPS). Sausalito and the National Park Service go back in legal battles several years but they also work together at times, sometimes to the benefit of one party or the other, as U.S. Department of Interior appropriations will reveal. In 1999, the Omnibus Consolidated and Emergency Supplemental Appropriations for FY 1999 made a "general provisions" dealing with the city of Sausalito and the Department of Interior. Basically stating that the NPS owned land at Fort Baker was property tax exempt and exempt from any kind of special assessment from the state of California, county of Marin, or city of Sausalito.

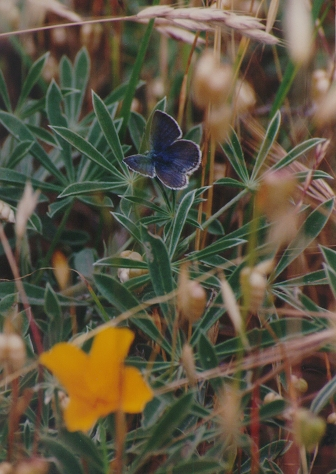
A Mission blue butterfly (I. missionensis) perched

The legal battle ensued when the National Park Service announced plans to finally allow a development group to build a large, long-awaited hotel/conference center complex on the remains of Fort Baker. The NPS first announced their intention to develop Fort Baker in 1980's Golden Gate National Recreation Area General Management Plan which proclaimed that Fort Baker would become a conference center. The group, Fort Baker Retreat Group LLC - is an amalgam of Passport Resorts, a hotel management company; Equity Community Builders, the development manager; and Ajax Capital, a financial partner. Talk about development at the site, managed by the Park Service, first began in earnest in 1998. By 2001, the city of Sausalito had filed suit to force an injunction against the Park Service's plan to go ahead with the project. The suit lingered in court for several years. The essential quarrel was over the size of the project which looked to be approaching the maximum size of 350 rooms as adopted in the June 2000 original Fort Baker Plan. The suit alleged, however, that the NPS violated numerous environmental laws during the development of the Environmental Impact Statement (EIS) for the project. The EIS was completed in 1999 and included the NPS' preferred alternative to the hotel/conference center. The alternative, 42 acres (170,000 m^{2}) of habitat, 23 specifically for the Mission blue butterfly, to be preserved, improved or repaired. Sausalito's 2001 suit also alleged that the EIS was "deficient."

It was not until October 20, 2004, that a judgement was handed down in the case. In City of Sausalito v. O'Neill the 9th Circuit Court of Appeals said that Sausalito did have standing to sue the NPS for an injunction to halt the hotel project at Fort Baker. The 2004 ruling proclaimed "standing" according to Article III of the U.S. Constitution. Article III requires that the defendant has suffered an "injury in fact", the injury is fairly traceable and it is likely that the injury will be repaired by a decision in favor of the defendant. The court found that Sausalito had an "injury in fact" because the Fort Baker project could attract up to 2,700 visitors per day, impacting traffic, aesthetic appeal and revenue in Sausalito.

The court also found that the city had statutory standing for the injunction suit as well. That authority came under the Coastal Zone Management Act (CZMA), and the Marine Mammal Protection Act (MMPA). The decision, however, was not a total victory for the city of Sausalito. The court rejected the city's claims under the NPS Organics Act and the Concessions Management Improvement Act (CMIA) and the Migratory Bird Treaty Act (MBTA). The court rulings on the other statutory claims are as follows:

- ESA: The law requires consulting the USFWS or National Marine Fisheries Service if federal activities might result in a taking. The 9th Circuit held that the NPS had consulted with USFWS as well as the NMFS during the evolution of the Fort Baker plan. Furthermore, the court held that the NPS had incorporated mitigation measures as recommended by the NMFS for salmonids and by the USFWS for the Mission blue butterfly into their final Environmental Impact Statement (EIS). They had complied with the Endangered Species Act.
- MMPA: The MMPA prohibits the taking of endangered or threatened species. The city argued that the National Park Service (NPS) failed to secure appropriate permits for takings as a result of construction activities associated with the Fort Baker plan. Since neither party had fully covered this issue in district court the 9th Circuit remanded the claim for an initial ruling on its merits.
- MBTA: Under this law it is unlawful to hunt, kill, or capture a migratory bird. There is an exception to this law and it revolves around habitat destruction. Habitat destruction does not effect a taking under the MBTA. The court ruled that the NPS did not have to seek MBTA authorization. This is because birds will only be distributed through habitat modification.
- CZMA: The coastal management program for the San Francisco Bay Area, federally approved, allows limited commercial recreational facilities within waterfront parks. They must be incidental to park use and not restrict public access to the bay, however. Both federal and state coastal management plans must be consistent with each other under CZMA. The "Bay Commission" determined that the NPS' Fort Baker plan was consistent with the Bay Plan. The city of Sausalito claimed that the Bay Commission's consistency determination did not satisfy the CZMA. The court concurred with the city on this point. It held that the NPS' consistency determination was based on improper ground, a general insufficient funding claim. The court remanded this claim, under the CZMA, to the district court for further proceedings.

Though the court rejected Sausalito's claims under the NPS Organic Act, the CMIA and the Omnibus Act the 9th Circuits findings for the city were a victory. Both the MMPA and CZMA claims were remanded back to district court for further inquiry. This helped lead to a settlement the next year. The entire affair was settled in 2005 when the city and the Park Service came to an agreement which resulted in the project being trimmed down to a 144-room hotel complex. The settlement actually capped the room capacity at a higher 225.

== Twin Peaks ==
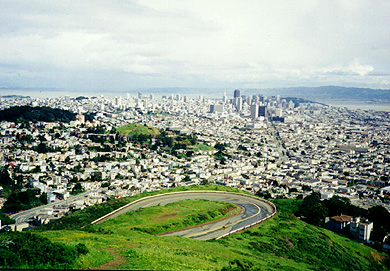
San Francisco from Twin Peaks

The Twin Peaks, icons of the San Francisco Bay Area, are also home to a reported population of Mission blue butterflies. The entire area is a park managed by the San Francisco Recreation & Parks Department (SFRPD). The park contains 31 acres (130,000 m^{2}) of what the Park Department terms "Natural Areas." This area is most of the park minus roads, viewpoints and the City Fire Department reservoir. The natural areas contain significant resources for preservation. They include some of the largest areas of coastal scrub and prairie that remains within the city of San Francisco. These, being the preferred habitat of the Mission blue, are areas that support and provide habitat for the butterfly. Twin Peaks receives heavy recreational use because of its picturesque view of the city. Twin Peaks supports a wide array of habitat types, from mixed forest to coastal scrub. Among the coastal scrub and prairies are silver bush lupine plants (L. albifrons) which support the colonies of endangered Mission blues.

The Mission blue was first reported in Twin Peaks in 1979; since then SFRPD staff confirmed their continued presence in 2000 and 2001. Protocols for monitoring include egg surveys on lupine plants at regular time intervals throughout the spring. In 2000, surveys found 56 eggs on 115 plants in the southern part of Twin Peaks. May 2001 surveys reconfirmed the original finding, albeit in smaller numbers. That year 14 eggs were found on 15 silver bush lupine plants. Between 2001 and 2007, SF Parks and Rec found only two adults and two larvae. In April 2009, a reintroduction was attempted with the release of 22 butterflies from the San Bruno population.

In February 2006, the San Francisco Recreation & Parks Department released its "Significant Natural Resource Areas Management Plan." The plan outlines site specific recommendations for the more than 800 acres (3.2 km^{2}) in over 30 San Francisco parks designated Significant Natural Resource Areas. The site specific plan for Twin Peaks covers the issue of habitat conservation for the Mission blue. The plan recommends that priority be given to "maintaining the habitat necessary for Mission blue butterflies, especially the host plant (silver bush lupine)." The silver bush lupine is common in and around Twin Peaks. In addition the Management Plan recommended that the Mission blue population at Twin Peaks]The Twin Peaks be monitored and the host plant populations should be augmented whenever possible.

The Mission blue is the only federally endangered animal at Twin Peaks; however, the Bay checkerspot butterfly is a federally threatened species. Aside from these, the park at Twin peaks is home to about 20 other species that are threatened or endangered at a local level. Most threatened species at Twin Peaks are of local concern only.

== Fire rehabilitation ==
Popular thought is that the host plants, lupines, require periodic disturbances in order to successfully reproduce. Many possible natural disturbances are actively worked against by humans, such as fire and landslides because areas are designed with a dual use purpose in mind, often for recreational use.

=== Solstice fire ===
The area where the Solstice fire occurred is under restoration.

In June 2004, the Solstice Fire burned near Sausalito, California. The fire started when an errant "international visitor" had a fire mishap while camping. This fire threatened historical buildings which a public-private partnership planned to turn into a conference center. The building was spared but a stand of non-native Monterey pines was not so lucky. The Monterey pine, a pesky invasive species that has become "naturalized," is continually encroaching on the coastal grasslands that the Mission blue butterfly prefers and requires. Over 250 trees were removed from the area after the fire, burnt remnants of what they once were. The charred trees were chipped and the chips utilized in an electric generation facility as well as on site to control cape ivy, another invasive species.

The area that was cut was seeded with native plants. Among them, purple needle grass, in fall 2004 and again in fall 2005 about one pound of purple needle grass seed was sowed directly on the burn site. 400 summer lupine seedlings were also planted, most were grown in nearby nurseries while some were collected in the Marin Headlands. Still, both plants are forced to compete with non-native Italian thistle and French broom.

=== Lateral fire ===
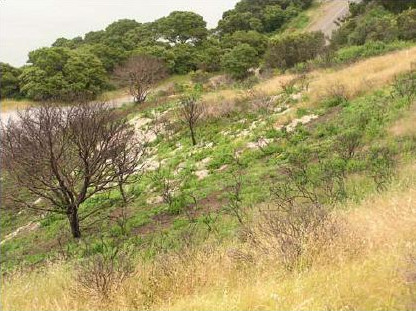
Invasive French broom has moved into the area of the Lateral fire burn.

The August 2004 "Lateral Fire" started, again, within Fort Baker, a half mile south of Sausalito, California. Besides threatening urban area, and historic buildings the fire threatened the habitat of the Mission blue. The fire happened within a 17-acre (69,000 m^{2}) habitat restoration project and burned areas of the butterfly's host lupine plant, Lupinus albifrons. Mission blues lay their eggs on L. albifrons each year. The fire burned about 300 plants. The U.S. federal government responded per the National Fire Plan.

Control of non-native species trying to reinvade the area was cited as a key measure in protecting the lupines, essential to Mission blue survival. The non-native French broom and Italian thistle were among the culprits seeking to re-enter coastal grass and scrubland. It was French broom which required the most intensive work to prevent reemergence. Three types of treatments were implemented in the effort to control French broom:

- mulching with weed free rice straw
- flaming with handheld propane torch
- dislodging or cutting with a hula hoe

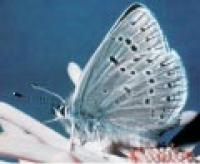
The endangered Mission blue butterfly inhabited the area of the lateral fire.

When these techniques were applied to seedlings within two months of germination, they were 90% effective. French broom seed stores were vast and the treatments required multiple applications. A huge new wave of French broom seeds followed three separate flaming treatments and a massive hand pulling of the invasive plant followed up the flame activity. The propane torches proved less successful against Italian thistle which was controlled utilizing mostly a hand pulling and herbicide combination. In an attempt to rehab the burned areas weed-free straw wattles and weed-free straw mulch to help with erosion control. Following the fire, monitoring was conducted and three findings were considered especially significant. First, about half of the area's lupines survived the fire and an increased number germinated after the fire. Live Mission blue caterpillars were found on a number of burned lupine plants. According to the life cycle of the Mission blue, these eggs would have had to have been laid before the fire. This would indicate that the butterflies, albeit in the early larval stages, survived the Lateral Fire.

== See also ==
- California coastal sage and chaparral ecoregion
- Habitat conservation
- Nature
