= Guadalupe Creek =

Guadalupe Creek is the name of several streams:

California

- Guadalupe Valley Creek, a tributary of San Francisco Bay in San Mateo County
- Guadalupe Creek (Santa Clara County), a tributary of the Guadalupe River in Santa Clara County
