= Flight 863 =

Flight 863 may refer to

- Trans International Airlines Flight 863, crashed on 8 September 1970
- United Airlines Flight 863, nearly crashed on 28 June 1998
