= San Bruno Mountain Ecological Reserve =

Nature reserve near San Francisco, California

- IUCN category Ia (strict nature reserve)
- Location within California
- Location: San Francisco Peninsula
- Nearest city: Brisbane, California
- Coordinates: 37°41′09″N 122°24′55″W
- Area: 83 acres (34 ha)
- Governing body: California Department of Fish and Game

The San Bruno Mountain Ecological Reserve is a nature reserve of 83 acres (34 ha) on the north slope of San Bruno Mountain, 8 miles (13 km) south of San Francisco, California, adjacent to the San Bruno Mountain State Park. It is managed by the California Department of Fish and Game to protect and preserve habitat, wildlife and open space, including the pristine Buckeye Canyon and parts of Owl Canyon.

In 1989, the state Wildlife Conservation Board purchased the land as an ecological reserve with Proposition 70 funds. Proposition 70, the California Wildlife, Coastal and Park Land Conservation Bond Act, was approved by California voters in 1988.
