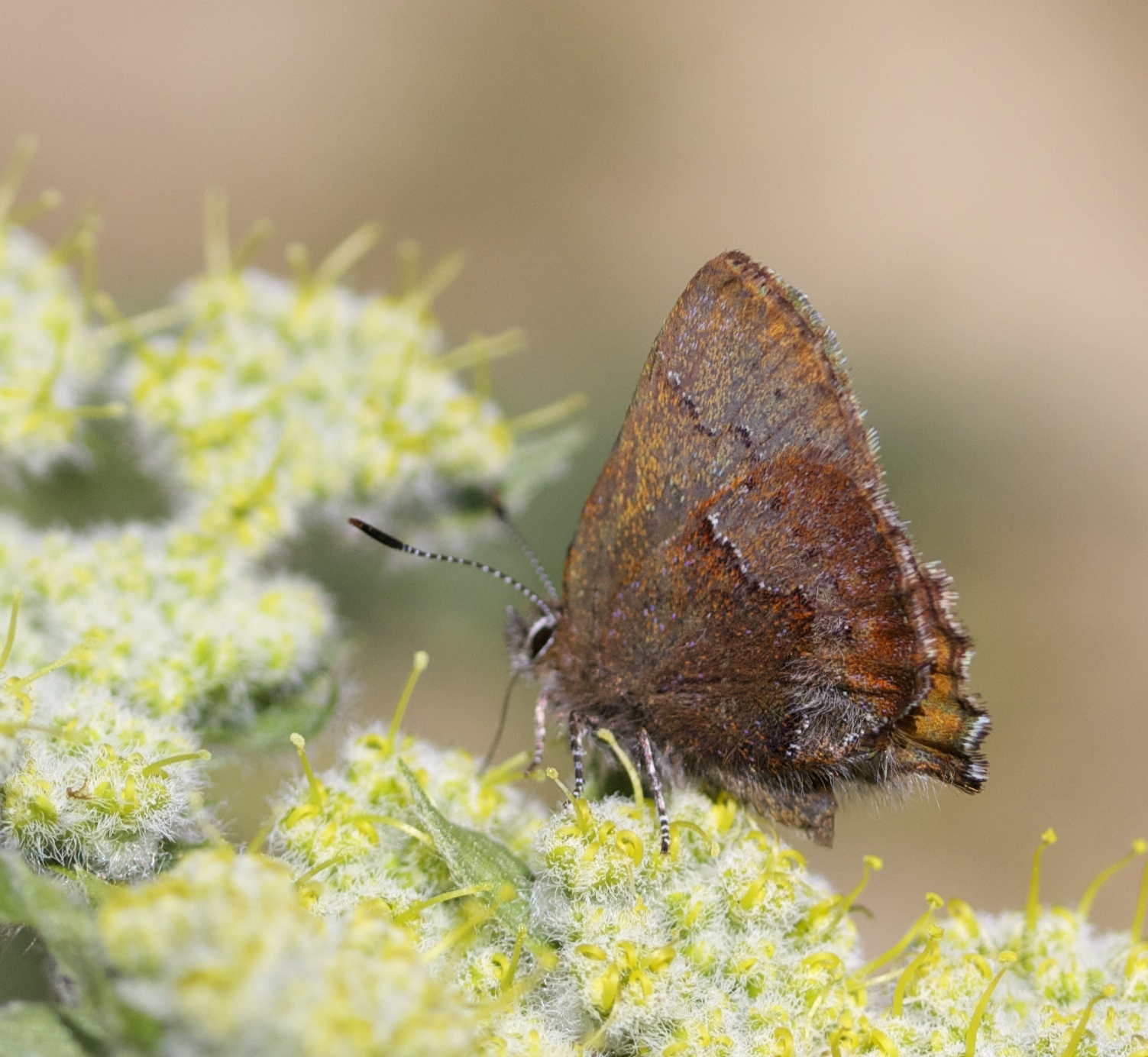
- Callophrys mossii ssp. bayensis

Scientific classification
- Domain: Eukaryota
- Kingdom: Animalia
- Phylum: Arthropoda
- Class: Insecta
- Order: Lepidoptera
- Family: Lycaenidae
- Genus: Callophrys
- Species: C. mossii

Binomial name
- Callophrys mossii (H. Edwards, 1881)

Subspecies
- Six, see text

Synonyms
- Thecla irus var. mossii H. Edwards, 1881; Incisalia mossii; Incisalia polios schryveri Cross, 1937; Incisalia doudoroffi dos Passos, 1940; Incisalia doudoroffi windi Clench, 1943; Callophrys (Incisalia) fotis bayensis Brown, 1969

= Callophrys mossii =

Moss's elfin

Species of butterfly

Callophrys mossii, commonly known as Moss's elfin, stonecrop elfin or Schryver's elfin, is a species of butterfly native to North America in the family Lycaenidae. It is found from British Columbia south to southern California and east to Wyoming and Colorado in isolated populations. The habitat consists of rocky outcrops, woody canyons and cliffs.

The wingspan is 22–28 mm. Adults are on wing from March to June in one generation per year.

The larvae feed on Sedum (including S. spathulifolium and S. lanceolatum), Sedella, Dudleya and Parvisedum species.

== Subspecies ==
Listed alphabetically:

- C. m. bayensis (Brown, 1939) – San Bruno elfin (California)
- C. m. doudoroffi dos Passos, 1940 (California)
- C. m. hidakupa Emmel, Emmel & Mattoon, 1998 (California)
- C. m. marinensis Emmel, Emmel & Mattoon, 1998 (California)
- C. m. mossii (Vancouver Island)
- C. m. schryveri (Cross, 1937) (Colorado)
- C. m. windi (Clench, 1943) (California)
