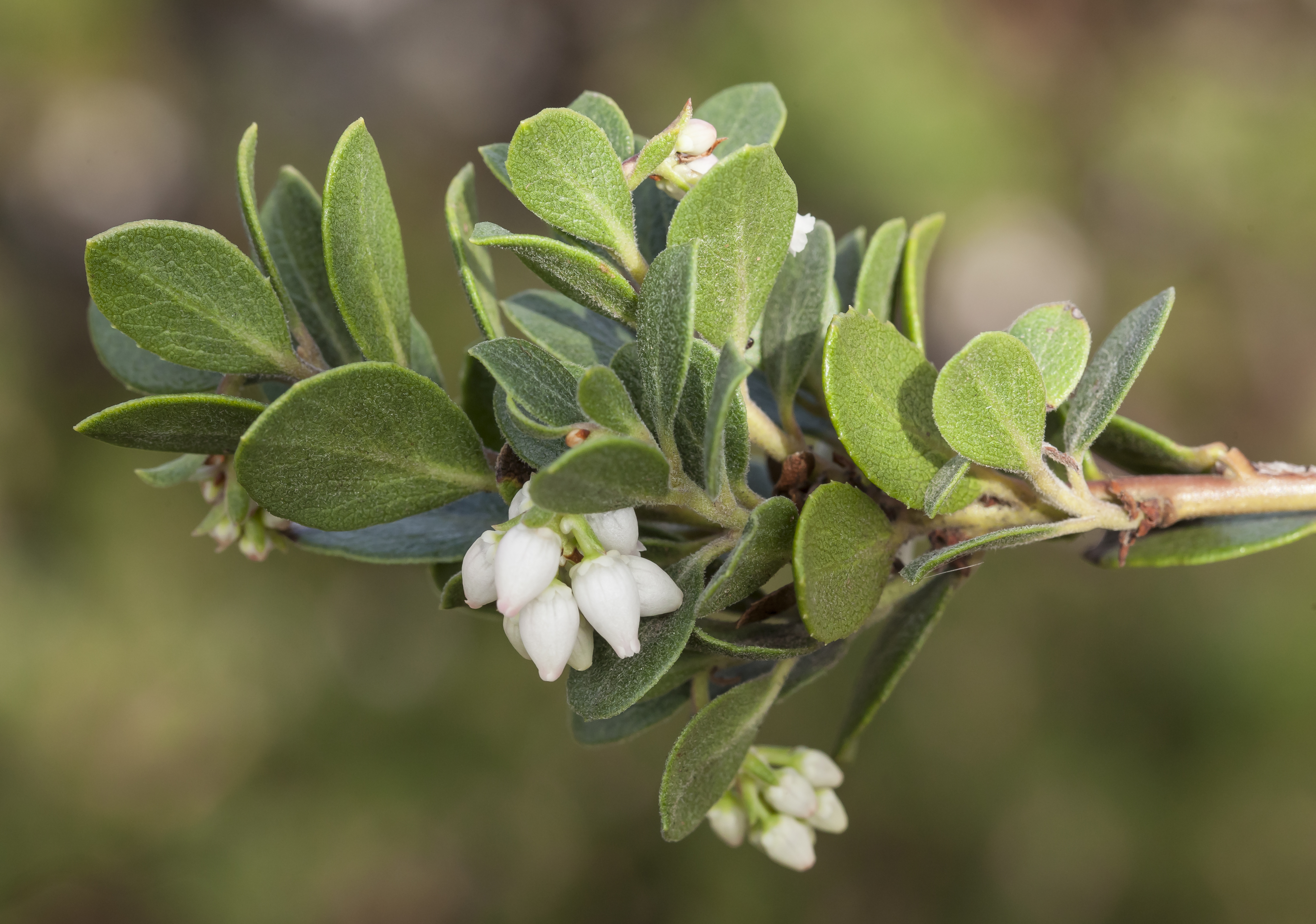

Conservation status
- Critically Imperiled (NatureServe)

Scientific classification
- Kingdom: Plantae
- Clade: Tracheophytes
- Clade: Angiosperms
- Clade: Eudicots
- Clade: Asterids
- Order: Ericales
- Family: Ericaceae
- Genus: Arctostaphylos
- Species: A. pacifica

Binomial name
- Arctostaphylos pacifica Roof

Synonyms
- Arctostaphylos uva-ursi var. saxicola Roof

= Arctostaphylos pacifica =

Species of flowering plant

Arctostaphylos pacifica, the Pacific manzanita, is a threatened species of manzanita endemic to San Bruno Mountain described by James B. Roof in 1962.

== Description ==
Arctostaphylos pacifica is a short burl forming species of manzanita that grows in mats on the sandstone outcrops of San Bruno Mountain at elevations of 300m. Specimens grow to 10–60 cm in height, the bark of the plant is an unusual light brown color compared to the red hue of other Manzanitas, the serrate leaves are pastel green and densely fill the branches. The plant uses ligno-tubers for clonal reproduction, which allowed for the species to survive the 1964 Devil's Arroyo fire that burned San Bruno Mountain, enabling plants to resprout from the reproductive burls.

== Etymology ==
Roof gave the species the epithet of pacifica as he believed that it "represented a relic link between three maritime species of manzanita that occur on California's Pacific Littoral".

== Taxonomy ==
Arctostaphylos pacifica was at one time demoted to hybrid status, however morphological evidence along with the absence of one proposed parent species on San Bruno Mountain led to its elevation back to species rank.
