= South San Francisco hillside sign =

Sign in San Mateo County, California

- South San Francisco Hillside Sign
- U.S. National Register of Historic Places
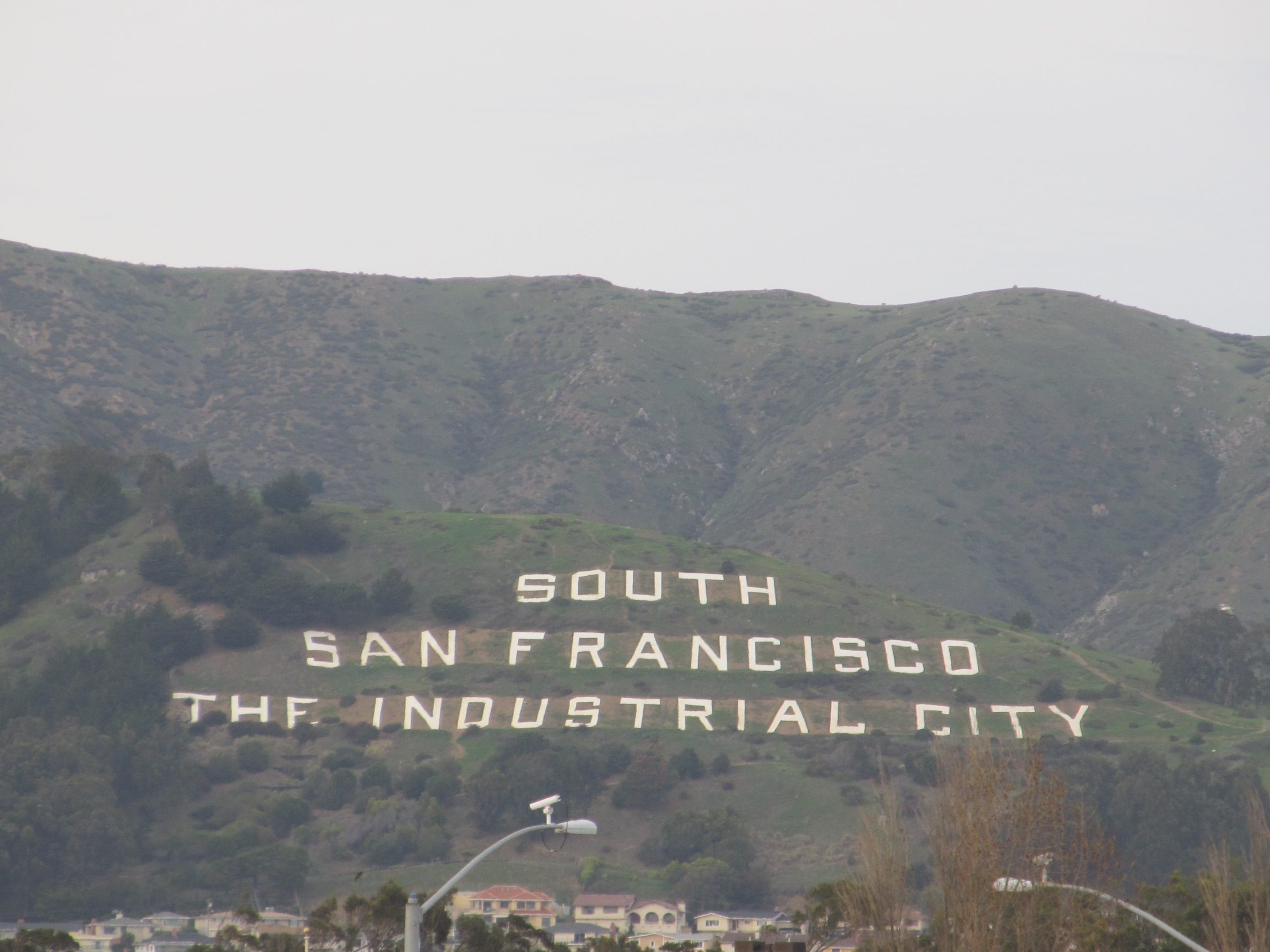

- Location within San Francisco Bay Area Location within California Location within the United States
- Location: Sign Hill Park, North of Park Way, South San Francisco, California
- Coordinates: 37.6614238°N 122.4189591°W
- Area: 41 acres (17 ha)
- Architects: Klassen, Robert A.; Kneese, George A.
- NRHP reference No.: 96000761
- Added to NRHP: July 11, 1996

The South San Francisco Hillside Sign is a historic sign on a hillside overlooking the city of South San Francisco in San Mateo County, California. It was created in the 1920s and was listed on the National Register of Historic Places in 1996. The sign is the main feature of Sign Hill Park, a city park which provides 30 acres (12 ha) of open space, almost 2 miles (3.2 km) of hiking trails, and access to the letters of the sign itself.

The sign spells out "SOUTH SAN FRANCISCO THE INDUSTRIAL CITY" in white-painted concrete letters and is visible to drivers on northbound U.S. 101 and flights to San Francisco International Airport.

== Design and setting ==
The letters are set on the south side of a steep 581-foot (177 m) hill, part of the San Bruno Mountain, overlooking the city. In order to create the appearance of straight, uniformly sized type despite the varied contour of the hillside, the letters are laid out using anamorphosis, ranging in height from 48 to 65 feet (15 to 20 m).

The first line, "SOUTH", is 166 feet (51 m) long. The second line, "SAN FRANCISCO", is 484 feet (148 m) long. The third line, "THE INDUSTRIAL CITY", is 628 feet (191 m) long. The letters are intact with the exception of the T in "CITY", which had separated the vertical line from the horizontal line by approximately 40 inches (1,000 mm) by 1996.

== History ==
An early version of the sign was installed on the hillside in 1923. Each letter was laid out by city engineer George A. Kneese to ensure even spacing and appearance. The letters for the first sign were carved directly into the hillside and filled with whitewash, consisting of a mixture of lime, white cement, and water; it was completed by November 22, 1923. Local high school students were hired to maintain the sign by removing grass and applying fresh whitewash. The construction method and scale of the sign were comparable to an earlier sign constructed in 1909 on the side of Yerba Buena Island to advertise the Portola Festival.

The current, permanent sign was created in 1929. The sign is cited as a prime example of "civic boosterism"; the intention was to advertise the city's welcoming attitude toward industry. Its location was chosen so as to be visible from the main north-south highways El Camino Real and the Bayshore Highway, as well as from the train and the nearby Mills Field airfield (now San Francisco International Airport). The sign was originally proposed, and the first sign was placed, by the South San Francisco Chamber of Commerce. The $5,000 cost of the second, permanent sign was funded by a special property tax assessment approved by the voters.

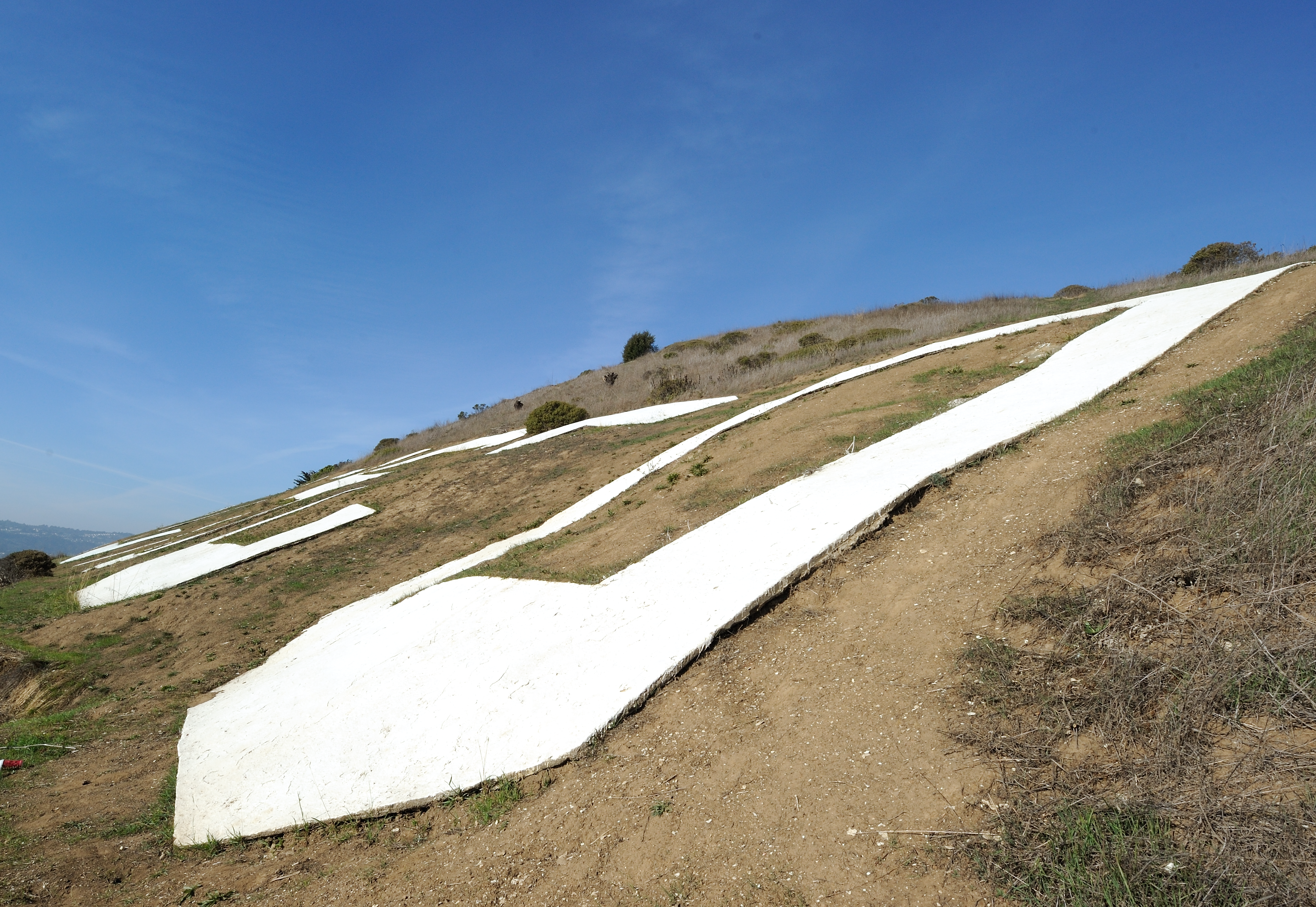
Close view of the letter "o" in "Francisco"

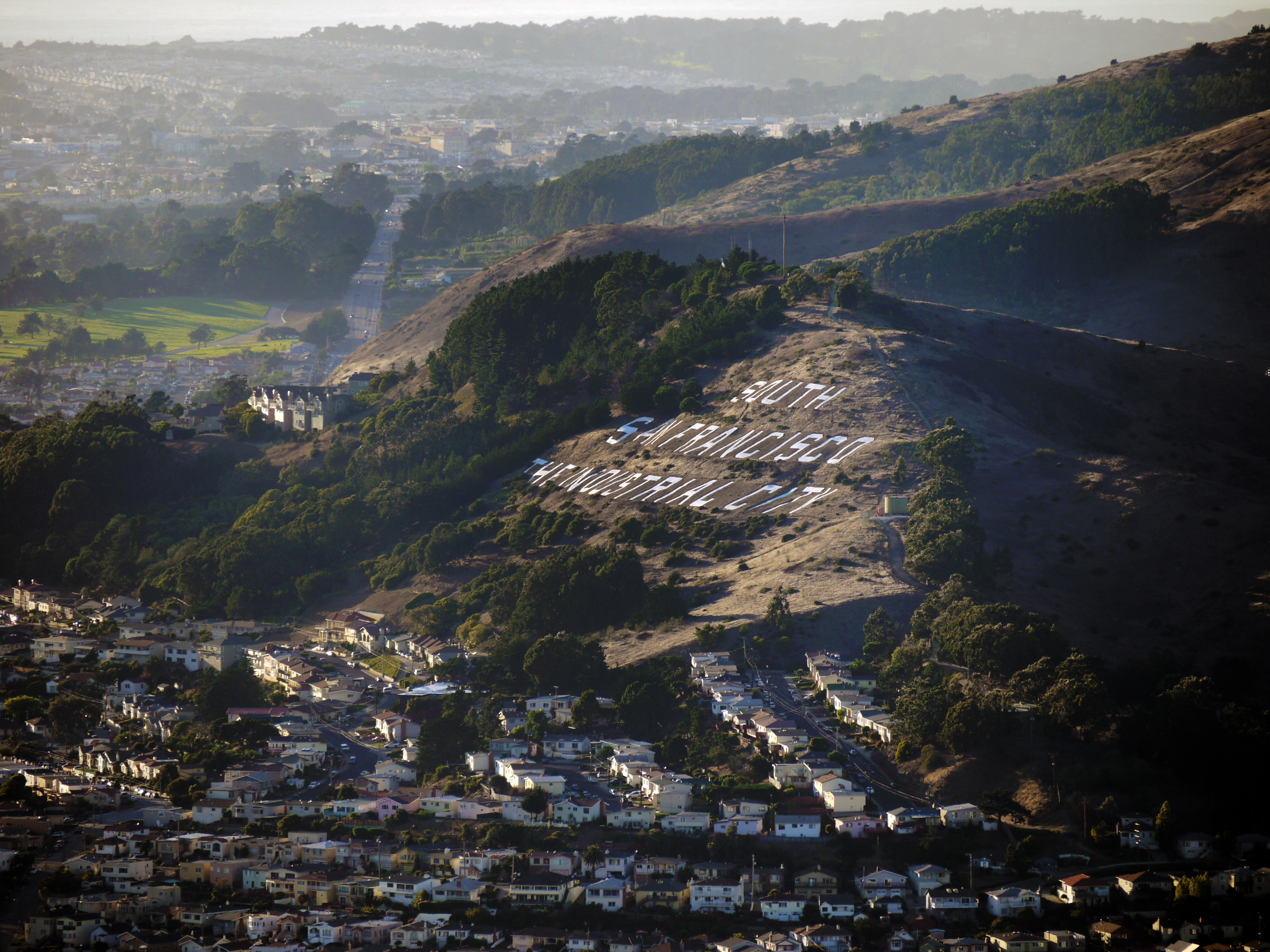
Oblique view of Sign Hill

At that time the city "was the smokestack capital of the Peninsula." There were steel and cement plants, meat packers, shipbuilders and many other industrial plants; major companies included W. P. Fuller Paint, Western Pipe and Steel Company, the Metal and Thermit Corporation, and the Western Meat Company. A shipbuilding yard on Oyster Point built 45 ships in 48 months for use in World War II.

A giant electric sign was added near the site in 1932; it could spell out letters using twenty individual "letter sections", each of which had twenty-one light boxes to form the pixels of the display. Each light box used fourteen sixty-watt lamps. The sign had an overall length of 388 feet (118 m) and it was claimed to be visible for 10 miles (16 km). In addition to displaying "South San Francisco", the sign was used for advertising slogans. It was turned off in 1939 as a potential beacon for aerial attack and never relit.

Following World War II the city's economy transitioned from heavy industry to light industry and then to high-tech and biotech companies. The city's largest employer is now Genentech, which has promoted South San Francisco as "the birthplace of biotechnology". As a result of this shift away from industry as the city's economic focus, there was a movement during the 1980s to tear down the sign or change it to "the industrious city". In response, the city's Historic Preservation Commission and Historical Society persuaded the City Council to seek historic designation, which was awarded in 1996.

In June 2026, the city of South San Francisco arranged for volunteers to temporarily paint the words in the sign red, white, and blue to commemorate the 250th anniversary of the United States. The words were actually painted in the alternate order red, blue, and white to ensure the city nickname "The Industrial City" was brighter (in white) than the words "San Francisco" (in blue).

== See also ==
- List of hillside letters
