= Rancho Cañada de Guadalupe la Visitación y Rodeo Viejo =

Mexican land grant in California

Coordinates: 37.700°N 122.440°W

Rancho Cañada de Guadalupe la Visitación y Rodeo Viejo (also called Ridley's Rancho) was a 6,416-acre (25.96 km^{2}) Mexican land grant in present-day San Mateo County, California, and San Francisco County, California given in 1841 by Governor Juan Alvarado to Jacob P. Leese. The rancho included three valleys: Cañada de Guadalupe, La Visitacion, and Rodeo Viejo. Rancho contained most of the present-day San Bruno Mountain, the city of Brisbane, Guadalupe Valley, and Visitacion Valley.

== History ==
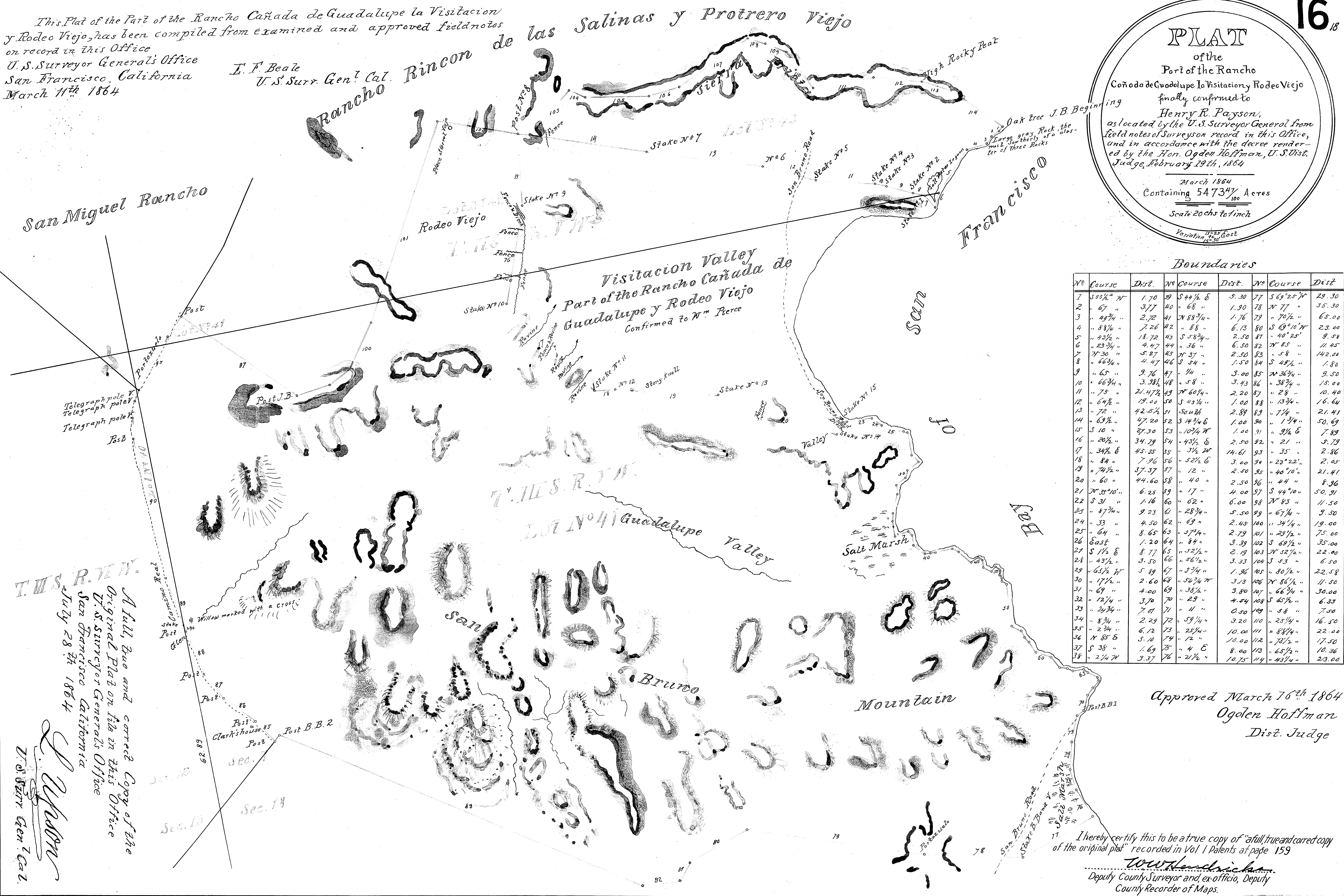
Plat of rancho in 1864

Jacob Primer Leese (1809–1892), a trader from Ohio, married María Rosalia Vallejo, sister of General Mariano Guadalupe Vallejo, in 1837. Lesse, who first came to California in 1833, took possession of the land grant entitled Rancho Cañada de Guadalupe la Visitacion y Rodeo Viejo in 1838, three years before he received the official title to the land.

Around the year 1843, Lesse traded his two-league grant to Robert T. Ridley (1818–1851) for the three-league Rancho Collayomi in Lake County. Ridley was an English sailor who was captain of the Port of San Francisco and had married Presentación Briones. Ridley never lived on the property nor developed it to any extent. Ridley died in 1851, and the land was sold at a sheriff's auction, with 700 acres (3 km2) going to Robert E. Eaton and the rest to Alfred Wheeler. Alfred Wheeler (1822–1903) was a prominent San Francisco land title lawyer.

With the cession of California to the United States following the Mexican-American War, the 1848 Treaty of Guadalupe Hidalgo provided that the land grants would be honored. As required by the Land Act of 1851, claims for Cañada de Guadalupe, la Visitación y Rodeo Viejo were filed in 1852 and 1853.

In 1865, 5,473 acres (22 km^{2}) of the grant were patented to Henry R. Payson. This tract was soon subdivided, with the Visitacion Land Company acquiring the largest portion. Another claim for 943 acres (4 km^{2}) of the grant were patented to William Pierce. Claims by Presentación Ridley were dismissed.

Central Pacific railroad magnate and banker Charles Crocker acquired 3,814 acres (15 km^{2}) of the Rancho in 1884 and another 183 acres (1 km^{2}) the following year. Crocker died in 1888, and the land became an asset of the Crocker Land Co. and then the Foremost McKesson Co.
