= United Airlines Flight 863 =

1998 aviation incident

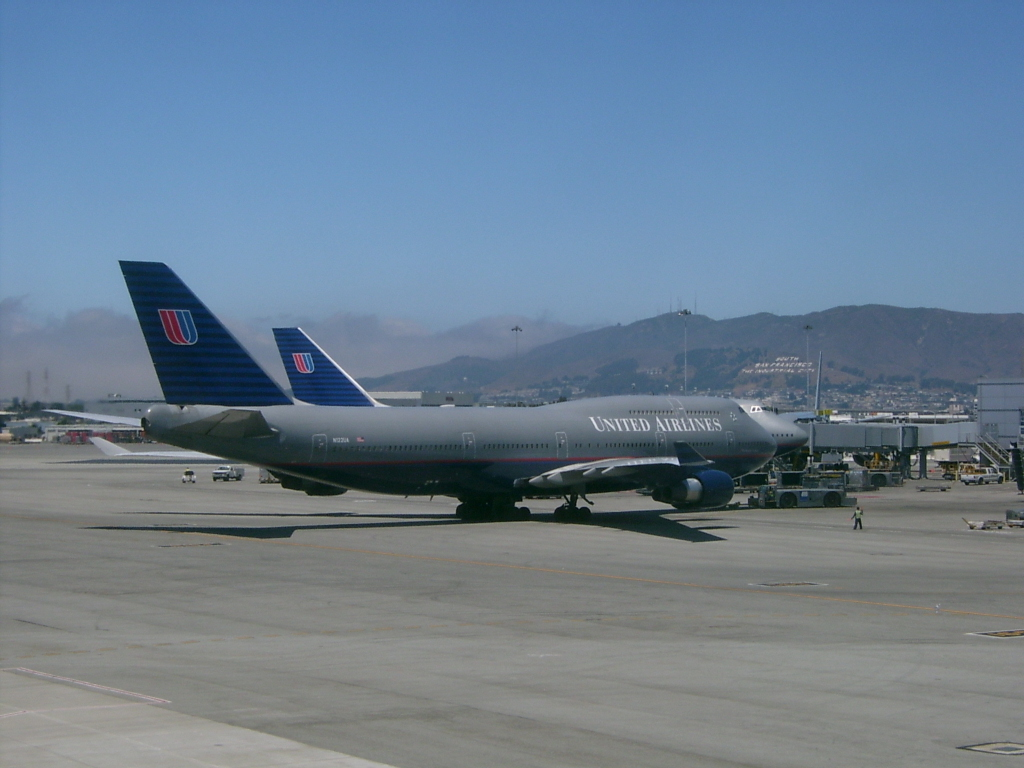
- Boeing 747-400s of United Airlines at San Francisco International Airport; San Bruno Mountain rises to a peak of 1,319 feet (402 m) in the background, excluding radio towers.

Occurrence
- Date: June 28, 1998
- Summary: Engine Failure and Near-CFIT
- Site: San Bruno Mountain, after takeoff from San Francisco International Airport

Aircraft
- Aircraft type: Boeing 747-422
- Operator: United Airlines
- IATA flight No.: UA863
- ICAO flight No.: UAL863
- Call sign: UNITED 863
- Registration: N???UA
- Flight origin: San Francisco International Airport, Millbrae, California, United States
- Destination: Sydney Airport, Sydney, New South Wales, Australia
- Occupants: 307
- Passengers: 288
- Crew: 19
- Fatalities: 0
- Survivors: 307

United Airlines Flight 863 was a Boeing 747-400 flying United's regularly scheduled transpacific service from San Francisco International Airport to Sydney Airport which, on 28 June 1998, was forced to shut down one of its right-wing engines and nearly collided with San Bruno Mountain while recovering from the engine failure. The aircraft was able to dump fuel over the Pacific Ocean and return to San Francisco for an overweight landing, but the occurrence prompted United Airlines to change pilot training requirements.

== Flight ==
Flight 863 to Sydney departed from San Francisco International Airport at 10:39 pm PDT on Sunday June 28, 1998 (UTC: 5:39 am, 29 June). As it took off, the Boeing 747-400 entered fog at the end of runway 28R. After lifting off, the crew experienced a "loud thumping noise" accompanied by vibration just after the aircraft's landing gear had retracted. The first officer was handling the takeoff under the captain's supervision, and since the noise occurred just after the landing gear had been retracted, at approximately 300 feet (90 m) above ground level, the first officer initially believed one of the tires had failed. At the same time, the exhaust gas temperature of the #3 engine (the inboard engine on the starboard wing) rose to 750 °C (1,380 °F), exceeding the takeoff limit of 650 °C (1,202 °F). With the first officer still flying, the captain retarded the #3 engine throttle to idle, which stopped the temperature rise and aircraft vibration.

There were two non-flying relief pilots in the cockpit during takeoff; both noticed the aircraft had lost approximately 40 knots indicated airspeed after the problems with #3 engine and shouted 'airspeed' to the first officer to alert him to the potential stall danger. At that point, the stick shaker system activated and the captain took over control of the aircraft. The captain later stated he held the aircraft level to gain airspeed and avoid a stall, but it had drifted to the right due to the imbalanced thrust and narrowly missed colliding with San Bruno Mountain, which rises to a height of 1,319 feet (402 m) above sea level, excluding the television and radio towers on its summit.

Illustration of roll, pitch, and yaw axes. Flight 863 attempted to correct for the right drift by using roll, rather than yaw.

According to the cockpit voice and flight data recordings, rather than using the rudder, the first officer had tried to compensate for the right drift by turning the aircraft to the left using ailerons, which control the aircraft's longitudinal "roll" axis rather than the vertical "yaw" axis which would have been the correct response to compensate for an asymmetrical thrust condition. The use of ailerons also deployed spoilers on the "down" wing, which increased the aircraft's net drag and decreased its net lift. A second activation of the stick shaker stall warning resulted. The relief pilots urged the flight crew to enter a shallow dive to gain airspeed and avoid a stall, but this soon brought the aircraft close to San Bruno Mountain. The ground proximity warning system then alerted the captain, who had since taken over flying the aircraft, to pull up to avoid striking the hill.

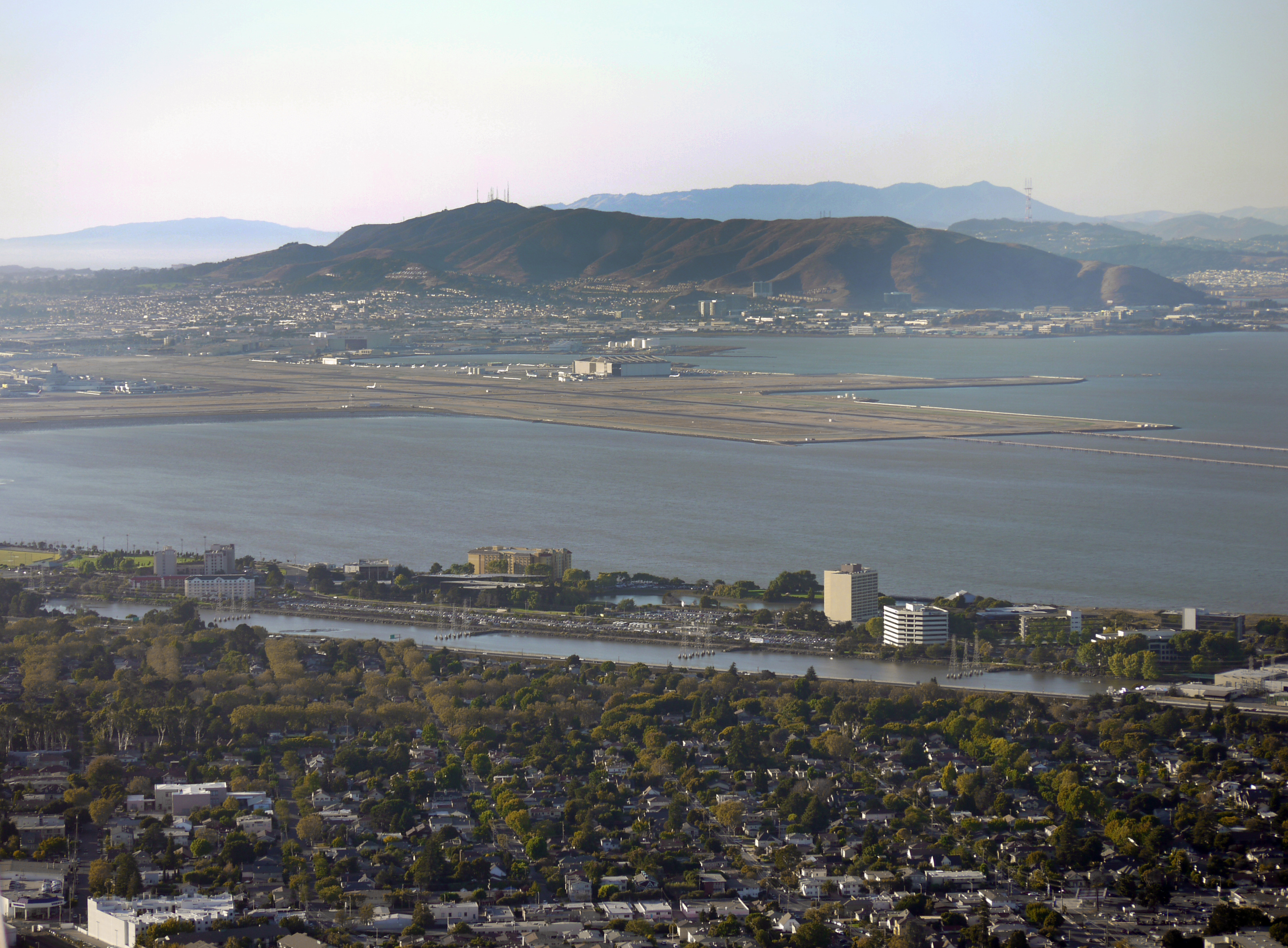
This photograph, taken from a blimp over Burlingame, California (foreground), shows the runways at SFO (in the middle of the picture) and their proximity to San Bruno Mountain (in the background).

By later accounts, the plane narrowly cleared San Bruno Mountain by only 100 feet (30 m). The aircraft had approached San Bruno Mountain so closely that air traffic control radars briefly stopped detecting the aircraft. An air traffic controller in the San Francisco tower was conversing with one of her colleagues and said, "... Is United 863 still ... oh there he is, he scared me, we lost radar, I didn't want to give you another airplane if we had a problem." In total, the aircraft had disappeared from radar for approximately 15 seconds. Residents in houses along the flight path, in South San Francisco, Daly City, and San Francisco, called into the airport to complain about the noise and voice their fears the aircraft was about to crash.

After the near-collision, UA863 was vectored out to sea to dump fuel to reduce weight and return to San Francisco for an overweight landing. During the initial climbout, the first officer stated he had noted the aircraft was handling sluggishly and was slow to climb, which he instinctively responded to by "[pulling] the nose up just a bit more to climb away from the ground." The first officer had limited experience, having made only one takeoff and landing in a 747 during the year preceding the occurrence.

== Aftermath ==
United Airlines revised its training protocols after the incident by implementing much more rigorous standards, which ultimately became industry-wide standards. All 9,500 of United's pilots were shown a recreation of the occurrence, filmed in one of United's simulators. As a compromise, pilots were required to make at least three takeoffs and landings in a 90-day period, of which at least one had to be in an actual aircraft. Aviation media consultant Barry Schiff noted the incident in an article decrying the lack of basic stick-and-rudder skills, especially among pilots who had never flown a light aircraft.
