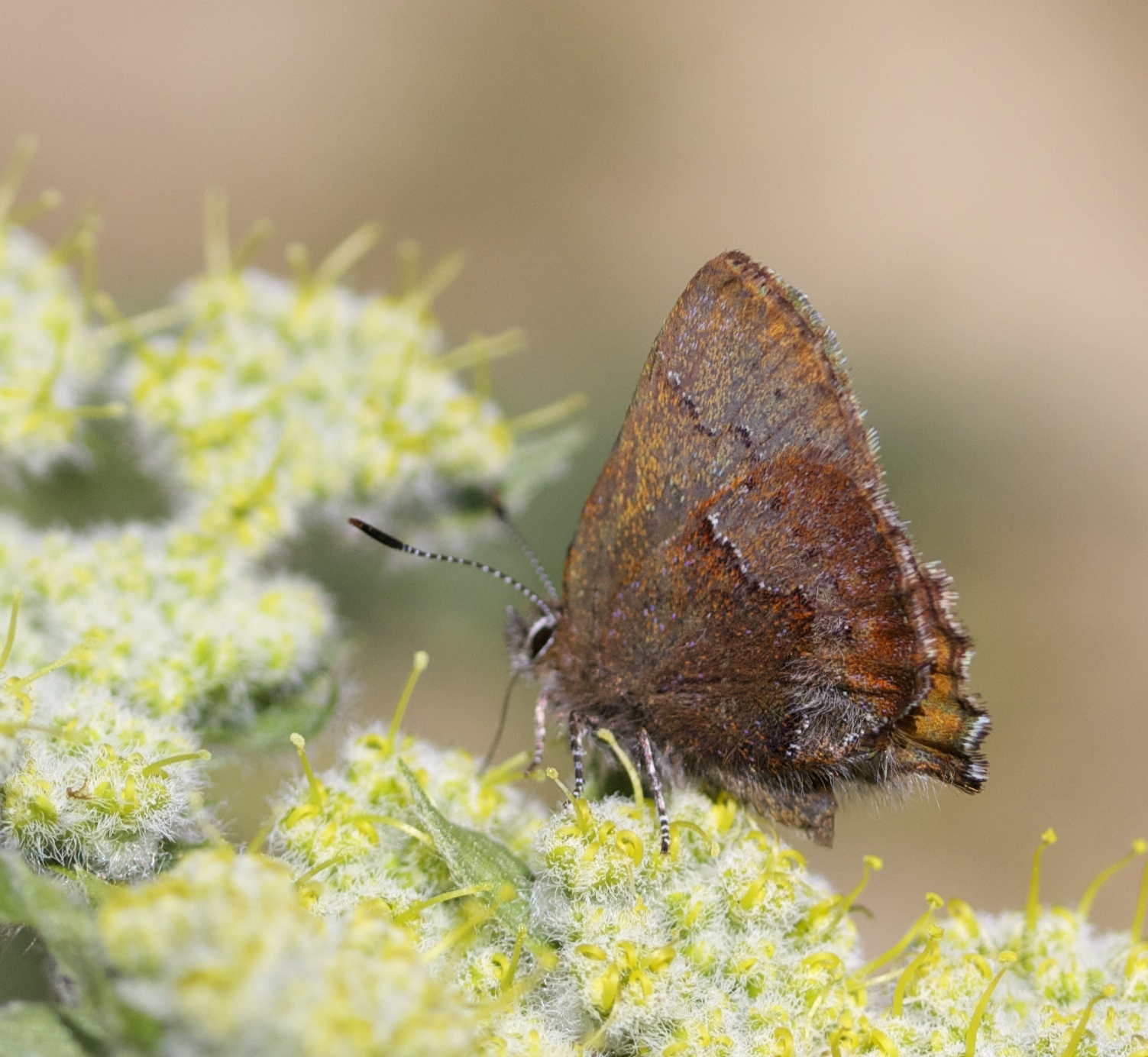

Conservation status
- Critically Imperiled (NatureServe)

Scientific classification
- Kingdom: Animalia
- Phylum: Arthropoda
- Class: Insecta
- Order: Lepidoptera
- Family: Lycaenidae
- Genus: Callophrys
- Species: C. mossii
- Subspecies: C. m. bayensis

Trinomial name
- Callophrys mossii bayensis (R. M. Brown, 1942)

Synonyms
- Incisalia mossii bayensis

= San Bruno elfin =

Callophrys mossii bayensis

Subspecies of butterfly

The San Bruno elfin (Callophrys mossii bayensis) is a U.S. federally listed endangered subspecies that inhabits rocky outcrops and cliffs in coastal scrub on the San Francisco Peninsula. It is endemic to this habitat in California. Its patchy distribution reflects that of its host plant, broadleaf stonecrop (Sedum spathulifolium).

== Life cycle ==
Adults of this butterfly emerge in February and March, when nectar providing flowers open. After mating, the female locates host plants on which to deposit her eggs, which hatch within a week. The tiny larvae first feed on the plant's vegetative structures; however, when the stonecrop's flowers begin to open, the larvae migrate upward and feed on the flowers themselves. By June most have completed their larval development at which time they evacuate from the host plant to pupate in ground litter. They lie dormant as pupae until the following spring, when the life cycle begins anew.

The San Bruno elfin's life cycle holds an interesting aspect, common to many other lycaenids regarding a symbiotic interaction with ants. Elfin larvae excrete a sweet liquid known as honeydew which attracts ants. In exchange for honeydew, the ants often provide protection from harm by predators and parasites, which are principal killers of foliage feeding insects.

== Range and habitat ==
The San Bruno elfin is restricted to a few small populations, the largest of which occurs on San Bruno Mountain. Most of these areas, akin to the distribution of the host plant, are scattered on rocky slopes and ledges, especially east facing (McClintock, 1968). One of these niches is in the vicinity of the old quarry. Its habitat has been diminished in the past by quarrying, off-road recreational vehicles, and urban development as land development pressure on the San Francisco Peninsula continues to fester. To protect the rare San Bruno elfin as well as the Mission blue butterfly a unique habitat management plan has been implemented on San Bruno Mountain, in which the lower slopes were opened for development while the higher areas were converted to public ownership as critical habitat. This strategy arose as a compromise result of years of conflict between land developers and conservationists regarding this unique piece of real estate, jointly prized for its outstanding habitat features and its economically valuable location.

Current management on San Bruno Mountain and in other areas focuses on reduced pesticide use, careful recreation management, and vegetation management. Several areas from which populations had been previously extirpated are also being targeted for revegetation and reintroduction of the butterfly.

Another population of San Bruno elfin is known to be established in Montara, on coastal bluffs about 25 miles (40 kilometers) south of San Bruno Mountain (Alling, 1986). This colony is near the Fitzgerald Marine Reserve. A third colony is found near Rockaway Beach, California in Pacifica.
