= San Bruno Mountain State Park =

State park in California, United States

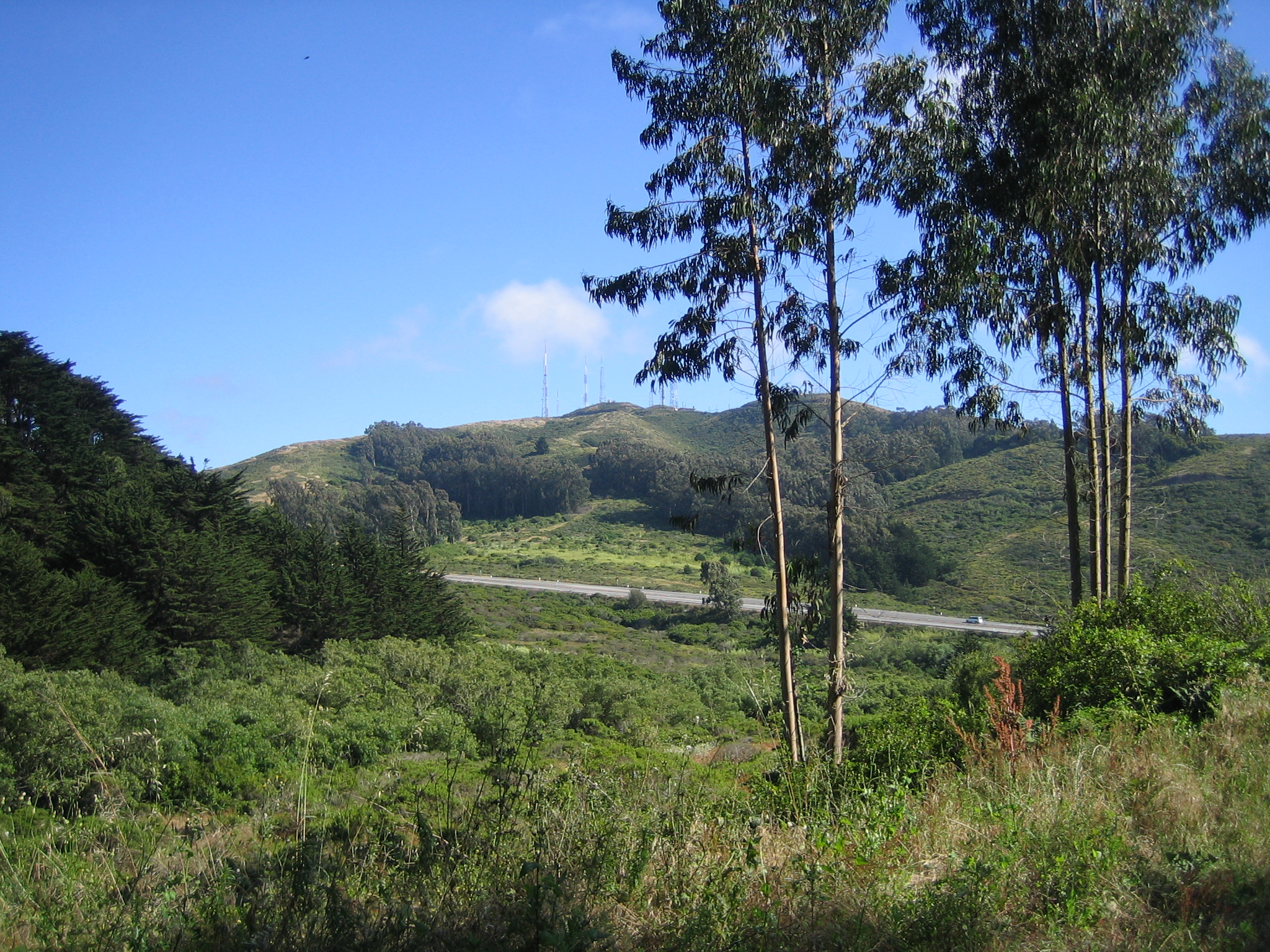
- View of San Bruno Mountain from the park

- Location within California Location within the United States
- Location: San Mateo County, California, United States
- Coordinates: 37°41′8″N 122°25′47″W
- Governing body: California Department of Parks and Recreation

San Bruno Mountain State Park, officially San Bruno Mountain State and County Park, is a park located in northern San Mateo County, California. It is adjacent to the southern boundary of San Francisco and borders the cities of Brisbane, South San Francisco, Colma and Daly City.

San Bruno Mountain State Park is a landmark of local and regional significance, standing as a unique open-space island in the midst of the peninsula's urbanization at the northern end of the Santa Cruz Mountain Range. The park is dominated by San Bruno Mountain which is a 4 miles (6.4 km) ridge. The park provides habitat for several species of rare and endangered plants and butterflies, including the Mission blue butterfly. Trails to the summit afford views of San Francisco and the Bay Area.

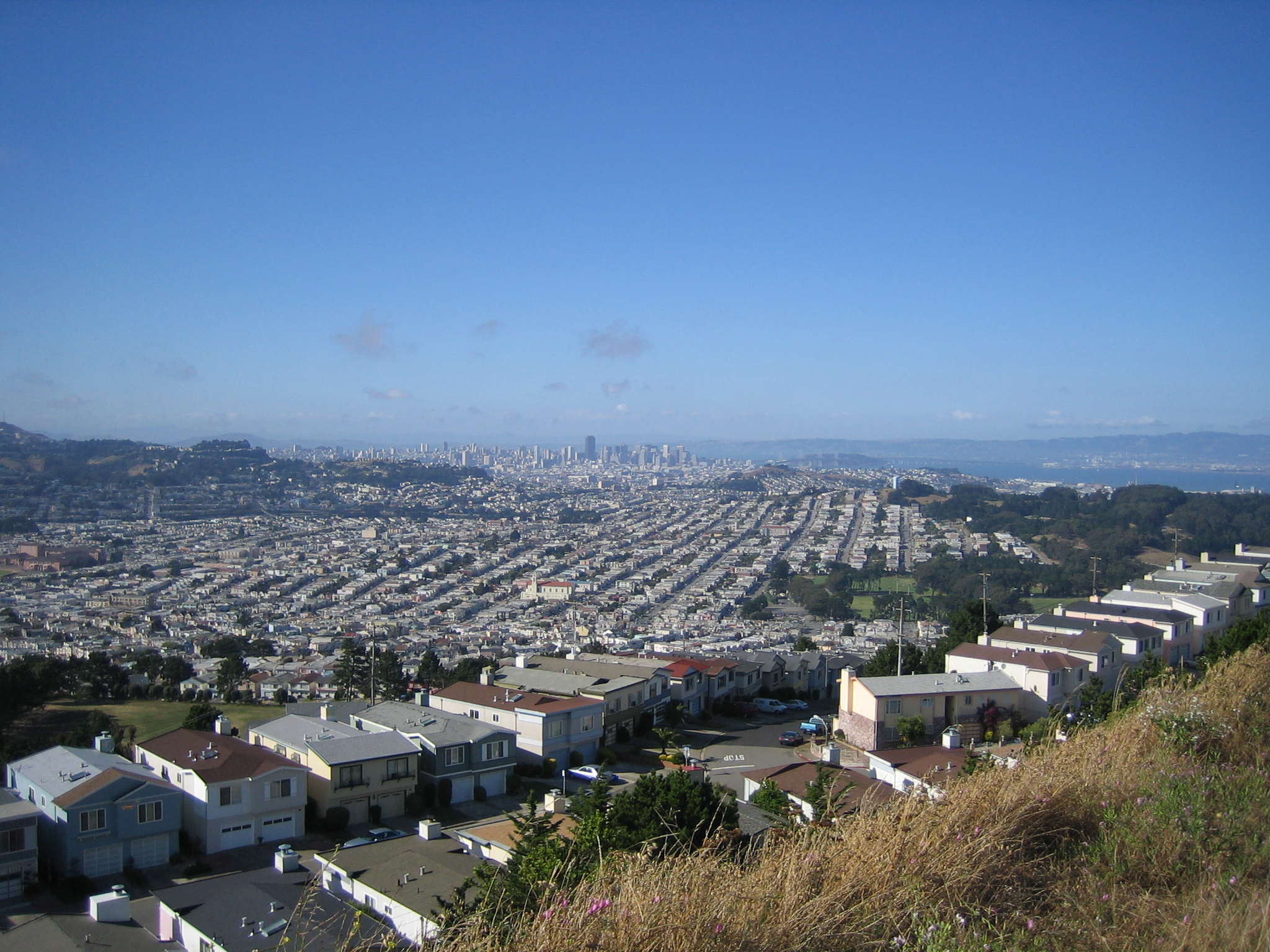
A view of San Francisco from the park

== See also ==
- List of California state parks
- Parks in San Mateo County, California
