= South San Francisco, California =

- City
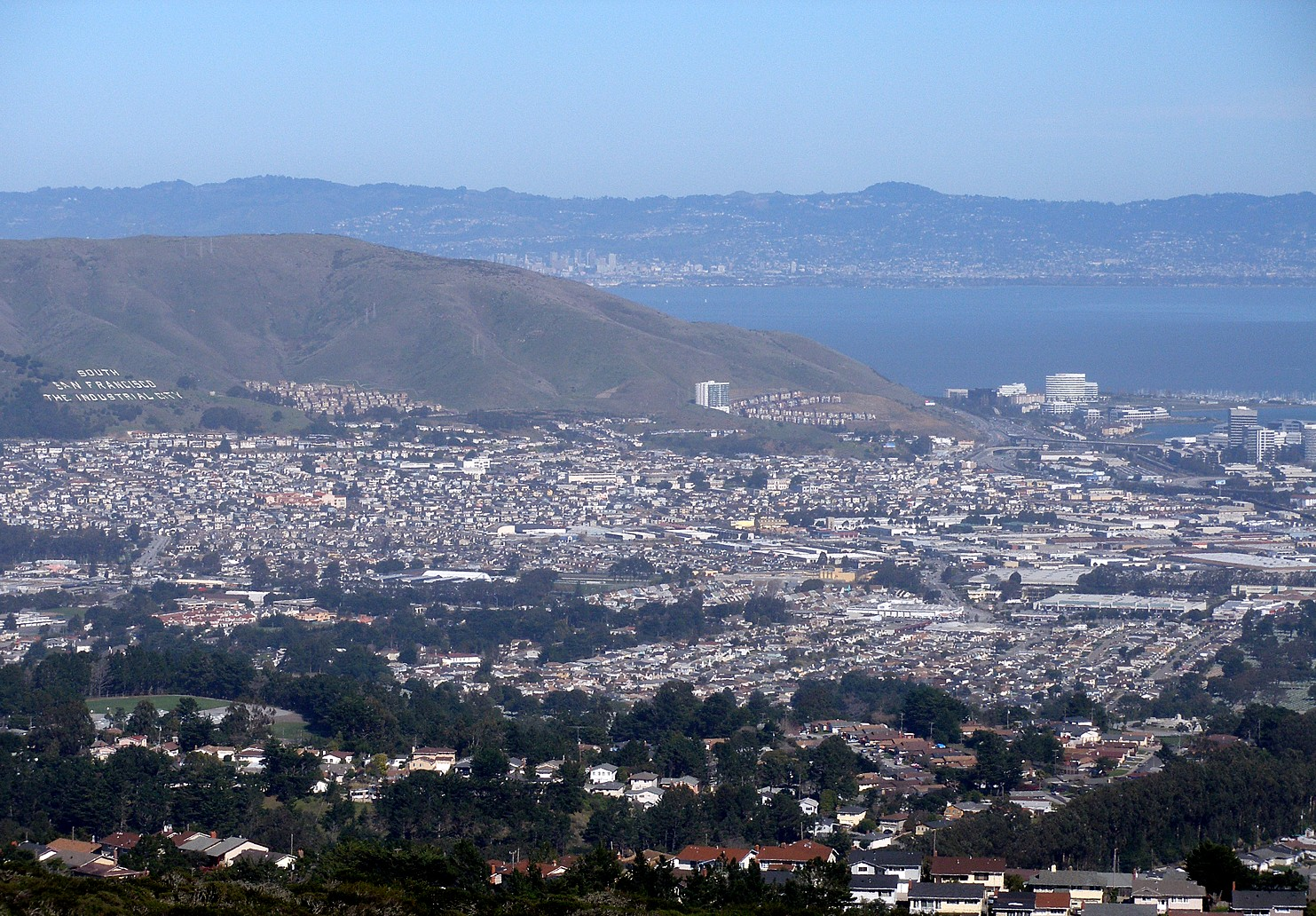
- South San Francisco as viewed from Sweeney Ridge

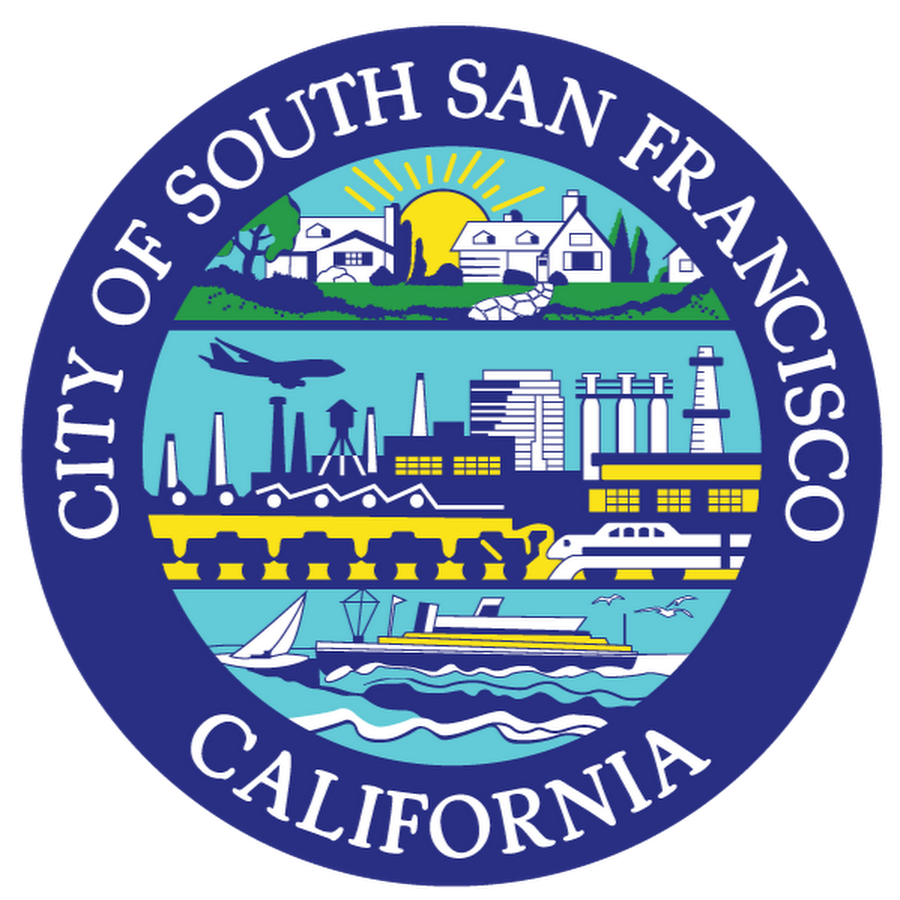
- Seal
- Nicknames: South City; The Industrial City; The Birthplace of Biotechnology
- Interactive map of South San Francisco, California
- Location within California
- Coordinates: 37.6551°N 122.3762°W
- Country: United States
- State: California
- County: San Mateo
- Metro: San Francisco–Oakland–Hayward
- Combined: San Jose–San Francisco–Oakland
- Incorporated: September 19, 1908

Government
  - Type: Mayor–council
  - Mayor: Mark Addiego
  - Vice Mayor: Mark Nagales
  - City Manager: Laura Snideman
  - Councilmembers: Buenaflor Nicolas; James H. Coleman; Eddie Flores

Area
  - City: 30.174 sq mi (78.150 km^{2})
  - Land: 9.204 sq mi (23.839 km^{2})
  - Water: 20.970 sq mi (54.312 km^{2}) 69.50%
- Elevation: 16 ft (5 m)

Population (2020)
  - City: 66,105
  - Estimate (2025): 64,941
  - Rank: US: 615th CA: 138th
  - Density: 7,182.0/sq mi (2,773.0/km^{2})
  - Urban: 3,515,933 (US: 14th)
  - Metro: 4,630,041 (US: 13rd)
  - Combined: 9,140,485 (US: 5th)
- Demonym: South San Franciscan
- Time zone: UTC–8 (Pacific (PST))
  - Summer (DST): UTC–7 (PDT)
- ZIP Codes: 94080, 94083, 94099
- Area code: 650
- FIPS code: 06-73262
- GNIS feature ID: 2411942
- Website: ssfca.gov

South San Francisco is a city in San Mateo County, California, United States, on the San Francisco Peninsula in the San Francisco Bay Area. The city is colloquially termed "South City". The population was 66,105 as of the 2020 census, and was estimated at 64,941 in 2025.

== History ==
Parts of what is now South San Francisco have been populated for more than 5,000 years. The northern San Francisco Peninsula was inhabited by the Ramaytush, a linguistic sub-group of Ohlone people. Their village of Urebure on San Bruno Creek was visited by the Gaspar de Portolà expedition in 1769; remains of long-term (5,000+ years) inhabitancy and seasonal encampments have been examined at the Siplichiquin and Buckeye shell-mounds on San Bruno Mountain. Charcoal-sampling indicates these ancient sites were actively occupied into the Spanish colonial period (late 1700s). The delta of Colma Creek was formerly an important habitat for the waterfowl known to be hunted by the Ramaytush in historic times, and archaeologic sites have been recorded near the creek. The city's plan recognizes the existing remains of a village (CA-SMA-299) along El Camino Real.

In 1835, the area which is now South San Francisco was confirmed to be part of Rancho Buri Buri, a large Mexican land grant to the Sanchez family, which they had used for cattle-ranching (with an easement for southbound traffic) for nearly a decade. While the Treaty of Guadalupe Hidalgo guaranteed the grant, taxes and legal-fees encouraged family-members to sell parts of the grant. Around that same time, the 12-Mile House was built as a stop on the San Jose Stage road. In 1853 SF butcher Charles Lux and business partner Alfred Edmondson, purchased 1,700 acres (7 km^{2}) in Rancho Buri Buri. In 1855 Lux bought another 1,464 acres (6 km^{2}) of Buri Buri land and soon partnered with fellow San Francisco butcher and entrepreneur Henry Miller, forming the stockyards and beef-raising firm of Miller & Lux. Lux bought out Edmonson's interest in 1856 and founded the town of Baden (now a neighborhood of South San Francisco) near the 12-Mile House. In 1863, Baden became a station as the San Francisco and San Jose Railroad was built.

The city of South San Francisco was conceived as an industrial suburb and was promoted by representatives of the Beef Trust, a group including some of the country's largest meat packing firms. A city plan was put forward in 1888 by Gustavus Franklin Swift, founder of the Swift & Company meat packing firm. The plan called for multiple individual meat-packing companies with a shared stockyard, as well as a residential area for employees. Swift proposed the name South San Francisco based on South Chicago and South Omaha, where the Swift company already had plants.

In 1890 Peter E. Iler of Omaha, Nebraska, an agent of the Beef Trust, purchased the Lux properties; ownership was transferred to the South San Francisco Land and Improvement Company in 1891. It was divided into industrial and residential districts, and the company installed lighting, sewer connections, and water distributions in the residential areas. A second corporation, eventually known as the Western Meat Company, set up stock yards and meat packing facilities on 80 acres (32 ha) of bayfront property; the facility opened in 1892. Other industries soon moved in, including a pottery works, two brick companies, the paint manufacturer W.P. Fuller & Company, the South San Francisco Lumber Company, and the Pacific Jupiter Steel Company.

The city of South San Francisco was incorporated in 1908 following a dispute with San Mateo County, which had blocked the construction of a smelter on San Bruno Point supported by the locals. Following incorporation additional industries moved into the town, including two steel mills. A new City Hall was opened on November 11, 1920.

By the 1920s the city was "the smokestack capital of the Peninsula." South San Francisco proudly called itself "The Industrial City", a motto immortalized in 1923 by a huge sign on a hillside overlooking the city. Industry remained the city's main economic focus through the 1950s. During the Great Depression the city maintained 35 industrial operations, including four meat-packing businesses, six iron or steel plants, a smelter for precious metals, seven equipment manufacturers of various kinds, two large paint factories, three other chemical works, and three food packing establishments. During World War II shipbuilding also became a significant operation. From August 1940, until the end of the War, a total of 48 ships were built and launched at the Western Pipe & Steel Shipyards.

At the end of the war the city's focus shifted away from "smokestack industries" toward light industry, warehousing, and residential development. The major manufacturers closed, and new development was focused on office parks, housing, high-rise hotels, and yacht harbors. The biotechnology giant Genentech opened in 1976, leading to South San Francisco's new identity as "the birthplace of biotechnology".

== Geography ==
According to the United States Census Bureau, the city has an area of 30.174 square miles (78.15 km^{2}), of which 9.204 square miles (23.84 km^{2}) is land and 20.970 square miles (54.31 km^{2}) (69.50%) is water.

South San Francisco lies north of San Bruno and San Francisco International Airport in the Colma Creek valley south of Daly City, Colma, Brisbane, and San Bruno Mountain; east of Pacifica and the hills of the northern Coast Range lying along the San Andreas Fault; west of the waters of San Francisco Bay. Locals often refer to the town as South City, in much the same way that San Francisco is called "The City." South San Francisco does not touch on San Francisco, with either Brisbane, Colma, or Daly City lying between them.

Two San Mateo County unincorporated areas lie within the boundaries of the city: the largest is owned by the city and is mostly leased to the private California Golf Club (an adjacent portion is occupied by Ponderosa Elementary School, controlled by the South San Francisco Unified School District. The other is Country Club Park - located along Country Club Drive and Alta Vista Drive between the Avalon and Brentwood neighborhoods. The city provides some services to these areas.

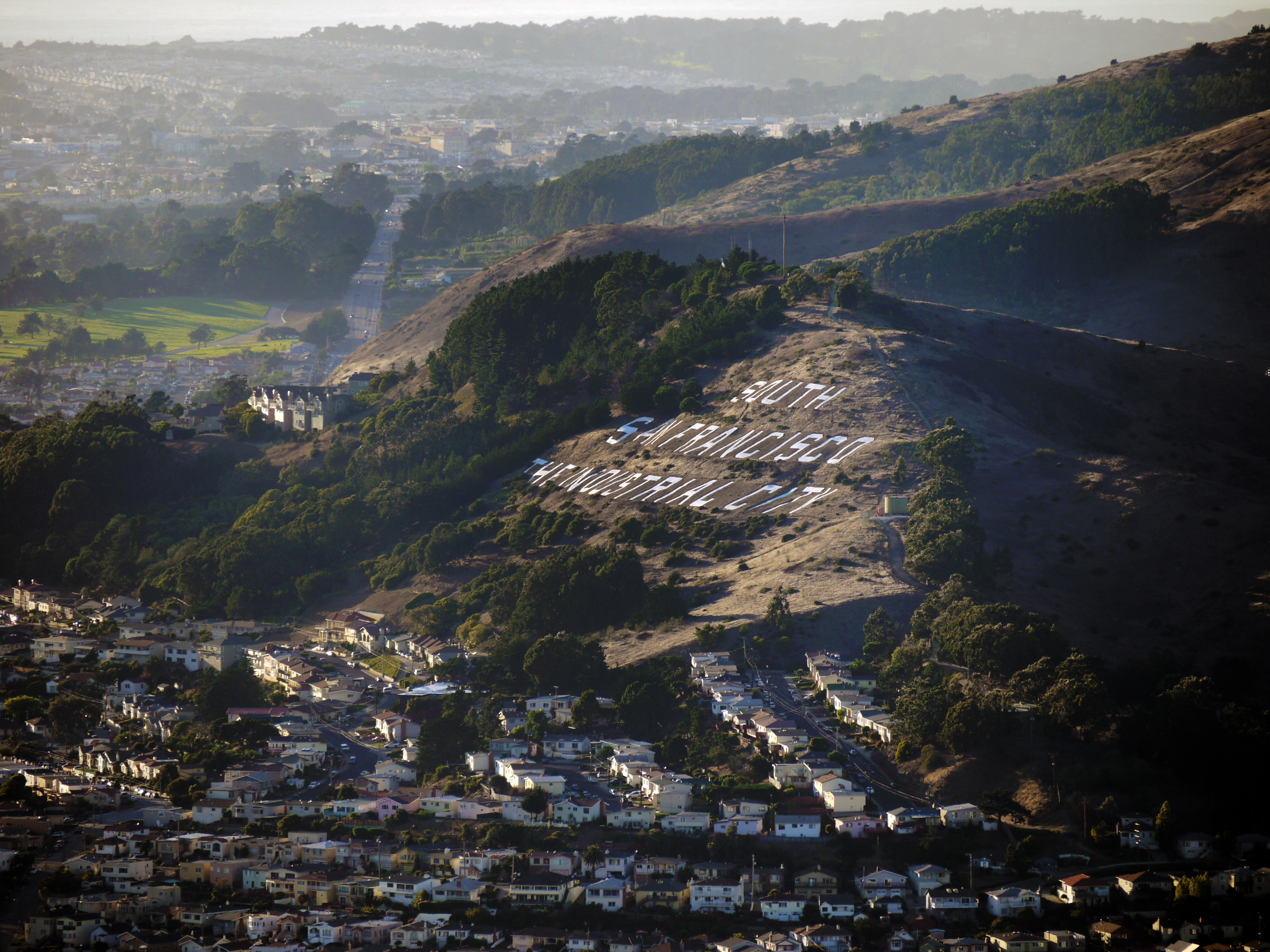
An image of the South San Francisco hillside sign, taken from a zeppelin

The city is particularly noted for the South San Francisco hillside sign on Sign Hill, which rises to the north of the city, with large white letters that proclaim, "South San Francisco, The Industrial City". The sign, a tribute to the city's industrial past, is listed on the National Register of Historic Places.

=== Climate ===
South San Francisco, along with most of the Bay Area, has a mild mediterranean climate (Köppen climate classification Csb), with warm, dry summers and cool, relatively wet winters. Much of the valley faces east toward San Francisco Bay, affording bay views from higher levels. South San Francisco has mild winters and dry cool summers. The hills to the west shield the eastern parts of the city from some of the fog that prevails in neighboring areas.

The microclimate of South San Francisco is dominated by wind from the nearby Pacific Ocean, which typically keeps the daytime temperatures quite cool year round, even during the summer months. January is the coolest month with August being the warmest month. The record highest temperature of 106 °F (41 °C) and was recorded on June 14, 1961. The record lowest temperature of 24 °F (−4 °C) was recorded on December 9, 1972. Normal annual precipitation is 19.64 inches (498.9 mm).

Climate data for San Francisco International Airport (1991–2020 normals), extremes since 1945
Month	Jan	Feb	Mar	Apr	May	Jun	Jul	Aug	Sep	Oct	Nov	Dec	Year
Record high °F (°C)	74 (23)	78 (26)	85 (29)	92 (33)	97 (36)	106 (41)	99 (37)	99 (37)	104 (40)	99 (37)	85 (29)	75 (24)	106 (41)
Mean maximum °F (°C)	65 (18)	70 (21)	75 (24)	81 (27)	84 (29)	89 (32)	86 (30)	87 (31)	91 (33)	87 (31)	74 (23)	65 (18)	94 (34)
Mean daily maximum °F (°C)	58.0 (14.4)	60.8 (16.0)	63.4 (17.4)	65.6 (18.7)	68.3 (20.2)	71.5 (21.9)	72.6 (22.6)	73.4 (23.0)	74.8 (23.8)	72.3 (22.4)	64.3 (17.9)	58.2 (14.6)	66.9 (19.4)
Daily mean °F (°C)	51.3 (10.7)	53.5 (11.9)	55.5 (13.1)	57.3 (14.1)	59.9 (15.5)	62.5 (16.9)	64.0 (17.8)	64.9 (18.3)	65.3 (18.5)	62.9 (17.2)	56.4 (13.6)	51.4 (10.8)	58.7 (14.8)
Mean daily minimum °F (°C)	44.5 (6.9)	46.1 (7.8)	47.6 (8.7)	49.1 (9.5)	51.6 (10.9)	53.6 (12.0)	55.3 (12.9)	56.4 (13.6)	55.9 (13.3)	53.4 (11.9)	48.5 (9.2)	44.6 (7.0)	50.6 (10.3)
Mean minimum °F (°C)	37 (3)	39 (4)	41 (5)	44 (7)	48 (9)	50 (10)	52 (11)	53 (12)	52 (11)	48 (9)	41 (5)	37 (3)	36 (2)
Record low °F (°C)	26 (−3)	30 (−1)	31 (−1)	36 (2)	39 (4)	43 (6)	44 (7)	45 (7)	41 (5)	37 (3)	31 (−1)	24 (−4)	24 (−4)
Average precipitation inches (mm)	3.89 (99)	3.96 (101)	2.73 (69)	1.36 (35)	0.48 (12)	0.14 (3.6)	0.00 (0.00)	0.04 (1.0)	0.07 (1.8)	0.79 (20)	2.04 (52)	4.14 (105)	19.64 (499)
Average precipitation days (≥ 0.01 inch)	11	11	10	6	3	1	0	0	1	3	7	11	65
Source: National Oceanic and Atmospheric Administration

South San Francisco is frequently windy. Summer is the windiest season, with winds averaging 13.6 mph (21.9 km/h); winter is the least windy season, with winds averaging 7.5 mph (12.1 km/h).

Month	Jan	Feb	Mar	Apr	May	Jun	Jul	Aug	Sept	Oct	Nov	Dec	Annual
Wind (mph)	7.2	8.6	10.5	12.2	13.4	14.0	13.6	12.8	11.1	9.4	7.5	7.1	10.6

== Demographics ==
Historical population
Census	Pop.	Note	%±
1910	1,989		—
1920	4,411		121.8%
1930	6,193		40.4%
1940	6,629		7.0%
1950	19,351		191.9%
1960	39,418		103.7%
1970	46,646		18.3%
1980	49,393		5.9%
1990	54,312		10.0%
2000	60,552		11.5%
2010	63,632		5.1%
2020	66,105		3.9%
2025 (est.)	64,941		−1.8%
U.S. Decennial Census; 2020 Census 1860–1870 1880-1890; 1900 1910 1920; 1930 1940 1950; 1960 1970 1980; 1990 2000 2010

The population grew from less than 2,000 in 1910 to more than 65,000 in 2024. It more than tripled in the thirty years following World War II with the opening of such subdivisions as Buri Buri, Winston Manor and Westborough on the slopes west of El Camino. The city has grown about 30% since 1985 as smaller fallow and commercial properties were developed, and single-family homes in the downtown area were replaced by denser housing.

According to realtor website Zillow, the average price of a home as of July 31, 2026, in South San Francisco was $1,235,804.

As of the 2024 American Community Survey, there were 21,838 estimated households in South San Francisco with an average of 2.90 persons per household. The city has a median household income of $136,578. Approximately 6.7% of the city's population lives at or below the poverty line. South San Francisco has an estimated 65.1% employment rate, with 40.8% of the population holding a bachelor's degree or higher and 86.0% holding a high school diploma. There were 21,650 housing units at an average density of 2,352.24 per square mile (908.20/km^{2}).

The top five reported languages (people were allowed to report up to two languages, thus the figures will generally add to more than 100%) were English (46.2%), Spanish (20.7%), Indo-European (4.3%), Asian and Pacific Islander (26.6%), and Other (2.2%).

The median age in the city was 43.2 years.

South San Francisco, California – racial and ethnic composition Note: the US Census treats Hispanic/Latino as an ethnic category. This table excludes Latinos from the racial categories and assigns them to a separate category. Hispanics/Latinos may be of any race.
Race / ethnicity (NH = non-Hispanic)	Pop. 1980	Pop. 1990	Pop. 2000	Pop. 2010	Pop. 2020
White alone (NH)	29,716 (60.16%)	24,258 (44.66%)	18,487 (30.53%)	14,016 (22.03%)	11,905 (18.01%)
Black or African American alone (NH)	1,775 (3.59%)	2,054 (3.78%)	1,621 (2.68%)	1,480 (2.33%)	1,184 (1.79%)
Native American or Alaska Native alone (NH)	138 (0.28%)	285 (0.52%)	197 (0.33%)	138 (0.22%)	125 (0.19%)
Asian alone (NH)	6,654 (13.47%)	12,862 (23.68%)	17,312 (28.59%)	22,923 (36.02%)	26,994 (40.84%)
Pacific Islander alone (NH)	—	—	896 (1.48%)	1,054 (1.66%)	996 (1.51%)
Other race alone (NH)	161 (0.33%)	122 (0.22%)	264 (0.44%)	287 (0.45%)	508 (0.77%)
Mixed race or multiracial (NH)	—	—	2,493 (4.12%)	2,089 (3.28%)	2,743 (4.15%)
Hispanic or Latino (any race)	10,949 (22.17%)	14,731 (27.12%)	19,282 (31.84%)	21,645 (34.02%)	21,650 (32.75%)
Total	49,393 (100.00%)	54,312 (100.00%)	60,552 (100.00%)	63,632 (100.00%)	66,105 (100.00%)

=== 2020 census ===
As of the 2020 census, there were 66,105 people, 21,803 households, and 15,803 families residing in the city. The population density was 7,182.98 inhabitants per square mile (2,773.36/km^{2}). There were 22,683 housing units at an average density of 2,464.74 per square mile (951.64/km^{2}). The racial makeup of the city was 22.06% White, 1.98% African American, 1.11% Native American, 41.40% Asian, 1.60% Pacific Islander, 18.48% from some other races and 13.37% from two or more races. Hispanic or Latino people of any race were 32.75% of the population.

=== 2010 census ===
As of the 2010 census, there were 63,632 people, 20,938 households, and 15,330 families residing in the city. The population density was 6,961.16 inhabitants per square mile (2,687.72/km^{2}). There were 21,814 housing units at an average density of 2,386.39 per square mile (921.39/km^{2}). The racial makeup of the city was 37.34% White, 2.55% African American, 0.62% Native American, 36.61% Asian, 1.75% Pacific Islander, 15.08% from some other races and 6.05% from two or more races. Hispanic or Latino people of any race were 34.02% of the population.

There were 20,938 households out of which 36.2% had children under the age of 18 living with them, 53.3% were married couples living together, 13.8% had a female householder with no husband present, and 5.2% were non-families. 20.5% of all households were made up of individuals and 8.9% had someone living alone who was 65 years of age or older. The average household size was 3.01 and the average family size was 3.45.

In the city the population was spread out with 21.7% under the age of 18, 8.9% from 18 to 24, 29.3% from 25 to 44, 27.0% from 45 to 64, and 13.1% who were 65 years of age or older. The median age was 38.1 years. For every 100 females there were 97.6 males. For every 100 females age 18 and over, there were 95.7 males.

=== 2000 census ===
As of the 2000 census, there were 60,552 people, 19,677 households, and 14,659 families residing in the city. The population density was 6,712.79 inhabitants per square mile (2,591.82/km^{2}). There were 20,138 housing units at an average density of 2,232.50 per square mile (861.97/km^{2}). The racial makeup of the city was 44.05% White, 2.82% African American, 0.60% Native American, 28.92% Asian, 1.56% Pacific Islander, 15.01% from some other races and 7.05% from two or more races. Hispanic or Latino people of any race were 31.84% of the population.

There were 19,677 households out of which 35.2% had children under the age of 18 living with them, 55.8% were married couples living together, 13.2% had a female householder with no husband present, and 25.5% were non-families. 19.9% of all households were made up of individuals and 9.0% had someone living alone who was 65 years of age or older. The average household size was 3.05 and the average family size was 3.51.

In the city the population was spread out with 24.2% under the age of 18, 9.2% from 18 to 24, 32.0% from 25 to 44, 22.0% from 45 to 64, and 12.6% who were 65 years of age or older. The median age was 36 years. For every 100 females there were 98.3 males. For every 100 females age 18 and over, there were 95.5 males.

The median income for a household in the city was $61,764, and the median income for a family was $66,598. Males had a median income of $41,442 versus $35,452 for females. The per capita income for the city was $23,562. 5.2% of the population and 3.5% of families were below the poverty line. Out of the total people living in poverty, 5.1% were under the age of 18 and 3.7% were 65 or older.

South San Francisco is a middle class and working class city. However, that image is quickly changing as a number of higher-priced homes have been built in recent years (particularly at the foot of the mountain that divides Brisbane and South San Francisco) to take advantage of the city's close proximity to downtown San Francisco, the bio-tech industry, and the peninsula. There are also developments of two-and-three bedroom condominiums in the Westborough district and on El Camino Real near the South San Francisco BART station. Since 2007, construction has begun to add more than 1,000 apartments renting at more than $2,000 per month.

The most commonly spoken language at home in 2000 was English (43.13%), followed by Spanish (28.36%), Tagalog (11.48%), Chinese languages like Mandarin and Cantonese (4.9%), Hindi (1.5%), Arabic (1.59%), although a locally large ethnic enclave - Italian (only 1.47%), Vietnamese (0.67%), Russian (0.56%), Korean and Japanese (0.6%), respectively, with other languages were spoken by less than half of one percent of the population.

== Economy ==
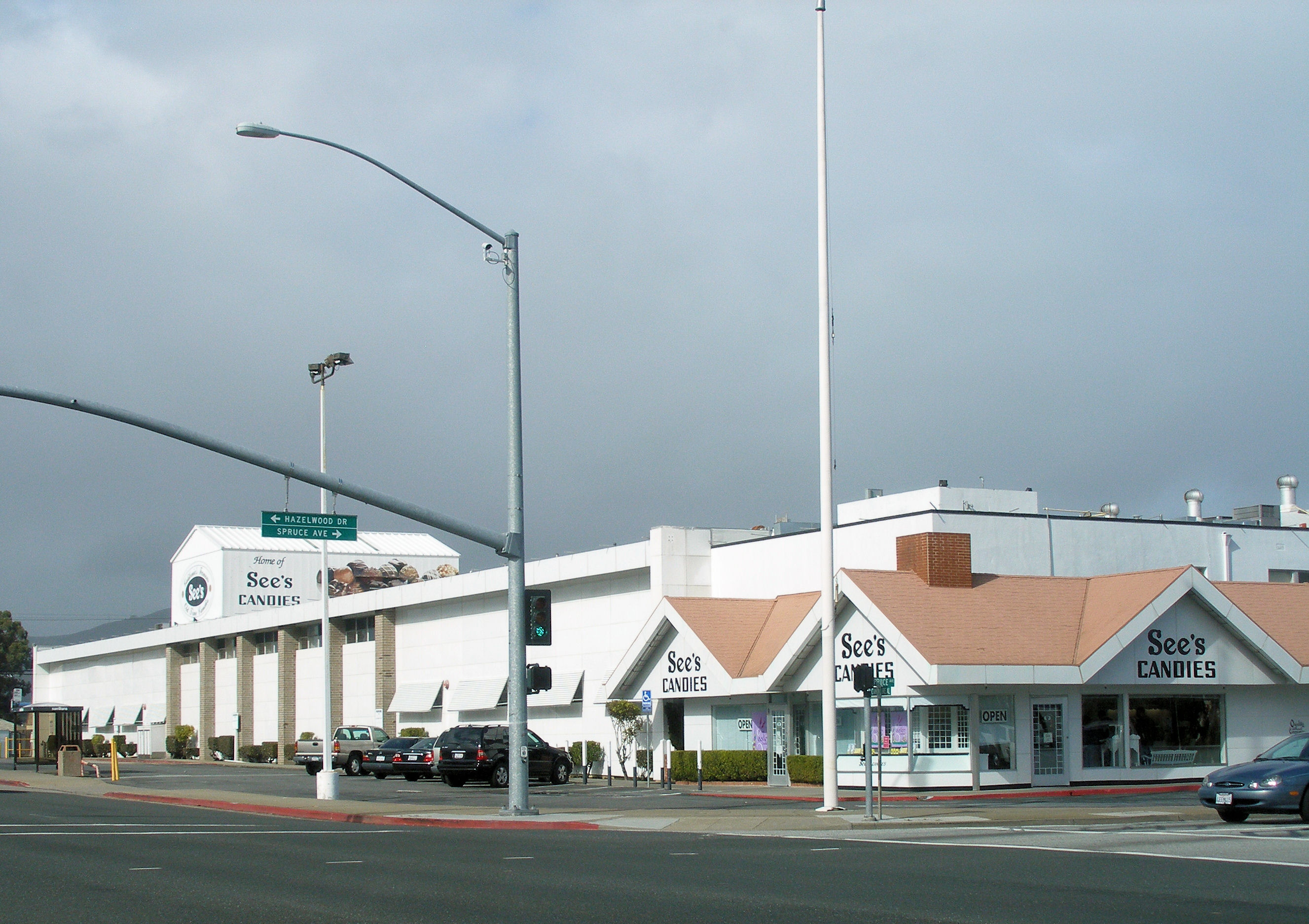
Headquarters of See's Candies on El Camino Real, South San Francisco

South San Francisco does not levy gross receipts or payroll taxes, although companies have to pay a business fee of up to $125,000 per year. According to city representatives, who emphasize a business-friendly image in line with "The Industrial City" hill sign, it instead relies on mostly on revenue from property, sales and hotel taxes.

Much of what is now South San Francisco was initially agricultural land and was originally known as Baden. Small pockets of farmland still exist near San Bruno Mountain, but these lands have, over the years, been replaced by residential subdivisions. Acres of Orchids, founded by the Rod McLellan Company in the late 1920s, was one such example of a farm being converted to housing. Once one of the largest facilities in the United States producing orchids and gardenias, the nursery closed in 1998. A new housing tract now sits upon the land formerly occupied by Acres of Orchids greenhouses, off El Camino near Hickey.

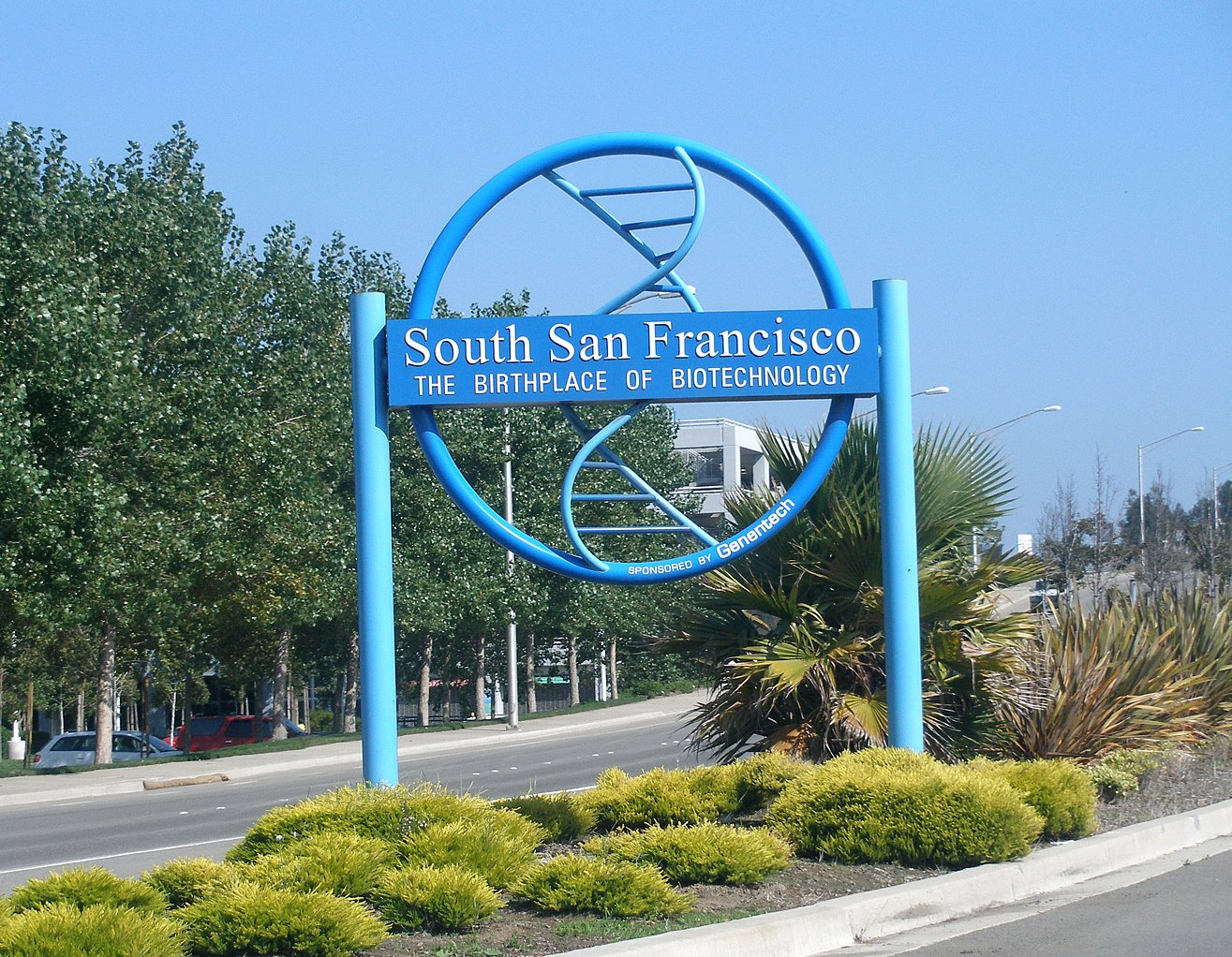
A sign placed at the entrance to the Biotech Area declares South San Francisco to be the "Birthplace of Biotechnology."

The flat land east of Bayshore Freeway (US 101) is the R&D Campus of South San Francisco.

South San Francisco is home to Genentech, one of the world's largest biotech companies, as well as a satellite office of Amgen, the world's largest biotech firm. Many other biotech companies, such as Exelixis, have also started or moved to South San Francisco to be in proximity to UCSF, Stanford University, and UC Berkeley; all are within an hour's drive. A sign located on East Grand Avenue declares South San Francisco as the "Birthplace of Biotechnology."

The headquarters and main factory of See's Candies is located in South San Francisco, having moved from the original plant in Los Angeles due to the cooler weather. Galoob had its headquarters in South San Francisco before Hasbro bought the company in 1998. Air China operates an office in South San Francisco. Hudson Soft USA (a subsidiary of Hudson Soft, and Sanrio, Inc.) had its headquarters in South San Francisco.

In October 2019, online payment processing company Stripe became South San Francisco's largest tenant by signing a lease for 421,000 square feet (39,100 m^{2}) of office space in the redeveloped Oyster Point, announcing it would be moving its headquarters there from neighboring San Francisco in 2021.

=== Top employers ===
The city's top employers - according to the city's 2022 Annual Comprehensive Financial Report,), California Employment Development Department, and the National Center for Education Statistics include:

#	Employer	# of Employees
1	Genentech	8,632
2	Kaiser Permanente - South San Francisco	1,000 - 4,999
3	AbbVie	1,000
4	South San Francisco Unified School District	857
5	Costco Wholesale	834
6	Life Technologies Corporation	622
7	Amgen	600
8	Verily Life Sciences	555
9	City of South San Francisco	more than 500
10	Amazon.com Services, Inc.	425
11	ZS Associates, Inc.	390
12	MRL San Francisco LLC	317
13	Frank & Grossman Landscape Contractors	265

Other significant employers located in SSF include FedEx, Health Plan of San Mateo, Mercedes-Benz of San Francisco, Safeway, SamTrans, United Parcel Service. There are more than thirty hotels with over 2,700 rooms combined, plus more than forty event spaces.

== Arts ==
The Linden Avenue Post Office has a Victor Arnautoff mural fresco painted in the 1930s. The Grand Avenue Library also has a collection of paintings and lithographs by WPA artists, including Maurice Del Mue and Suzanne Scheuer.

The Cabot, Cabot and Forbes Tower was constructed in 1967 as the centerpiece of an industrial park (37.654°N 122.385°W); this 92-foot-tall (28 m) sculpture by Lucia and Aristides Demetrios is one of the world's largest aeolian harps. Named for Aeolus, the Greek god of the wind, and invented by the 17th-century polymath Athanasius Kircher, an aeolian harp is a passive instrument played by the movement of the wind. Fabricated from steel manufactured at Bethlehem Steel. It was designed to "take advantage of the viewer’s motion… constantly changing, presenting a series of graceful ellipses and a shifting light pattern."

In 1984, the city began to pursue the acquisition of sculpture, most of which are displayed in parks and other public spaces. This program is administered by a Cultural Arts Commission, which also sponsors youth programs and public events. The South San Francisco BART station displays a series of murals based on historic photographs of the city and its people which may be viewed from the transit platform.

== Government ==
The city is governed by a five-member City Council, with one of the five council members serving as Mayor for one year in a rotation among the other council members. Council members are elected by district and serve a four-year term. As of 2026 the council is composed of Mayor Mark Addiego, Vice Mayor Mark Nagales, Councilmember James H. Coleman, Councilmember Eddie Flores, and Councilmember Buenaflor Nicolas. The City Manager is Sharon Ranals. In 2020, James Coleman defeated 18-year incumbent Richard Garbarino to become the youngest and first openly LGBTQ member of the city council. On January 26, 2021, the city council appointed Eddie Flores to fill a vacancy left by Councilmember Karyl Matsumoto, who did not run for reelection in 2020.

In the California State Legislature, South San Francisco is in the 13th senatorial district, represented by Democrat Josh Becker, the 11th senatorial district, represented by Democrat Scott Wiener, and in the 21st Assembly district, represented by Democrat Diane Papan and the 19th Assembly district, represented by Democrat Catherine Stefani.

In the United States House of Representatives, South San Francisco is in California's 15th congressional district, represented by Democrat Kevin Mullin.

According to the California Secretary of State, as of February 10, 2019, South San Francisco had 32,934 registered voters. Of those, 17,627 (53.5%) were registered Democrats, 3,590 (10.9%) were registered Republicans, and 10,573 (32.1%) had declined to state a political party.

== Services ==
The South San Francisco Fire Department has five fire stations. Station 61 is home to Engine 61, Rescue 61, Battalion 17, and a basic life support ambulance. Station 62 is home to Quint 62. Station 63 is home to Engine and Rescue 63. Its nickname is "The Bunker". Station 64 is home to Engine 64. Station 65 is home to Engine 65 and USAR 165 (Heavy Rescue). Urban Search and Rescue, or USAR 165 is stationed there. It is staffed by on duty crew from around the city and is decided before every shift. Rescue Boat 62 is located at Oyster Point Marina and can be staffed by Q62 personnel if needed.

The city's Police Department is responsible for patrols (including K-9 teams), emergency response, traffic regulation and enforcement, and public safety. The department cooperates with and provides manpower for regional agencies in order to provide S.W.A.T. response, Hostage Negotiation, and task-forces for narcotics investigation and enforcement, vehicle theft prevention and investigation, and a Drug Enforcement Agency effort. The department is led by a chief, three captains (Patrol, Investigations, Community Relations/Operations), four lieutenant watch-commanders, and a communications manager. More than fifty sworn officers and detectives are employed by the department, as well as a mental health clinician, dispatchers, traffic-enforcement personnel, and outreach teams for commercial areas and schools.

Water service in the city is largely sourced from surface water runoff to the Hetch-Hetchy Project's O'Shaughnessy Dam on the Tuolomne River. The San Francisco Regional Water System (SF RWS) is operated by San Francisco's Public Utilities Commission. Most homes and businesses get their water provided by California Water Service which purchases water from the SF RWS's San Andreas and Crystal Springs reservoirs and also operates eight wells in the city. South San Francisco's sewers and wastewater treatment service are operated by the SSF Public Works Department.. The Westborough Water District provides both water and sewer service to the parts of the city which lie west of Junipero Serra Boulevard. Solid waste disposal is contracted by the city with South San Francisco Scavenger Company, Inc

== Education ==
South San Francisco High School, also known as South City High

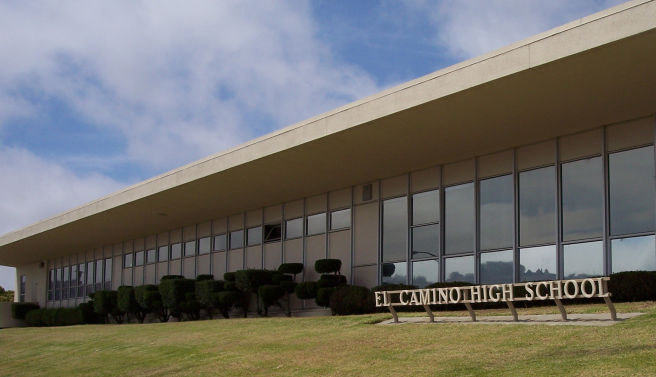
El Camino High School

South San Francisco is part of the South San Francisco Unified School District, which also serves portions of the neighboring cities of Daly City and San Bruno. The city is home to two public high schools: El Camino High School and South San Francisco High School, which share a cross-town rivalry. Baden High School and South San Francisco Adult Education are the city's two continuation schools. The city also has three public middle schools: Parkway Heights, Westborough, and Alta Loma, as well as public elementary schools, including: Buri-Buri, Junipero Serra (located in Daly City), Los Cerritos, Martin, Monte Verde (in San Bruno), Ponderosa, Skyline (in Daly City), Spruce, and Sunshine Gardens.

Several parochial schools are also established in the city: All Souls School, Mater Dolorosa Catholic School (recently closed), and St. Veronica's School.

The city is served by the South San Francisco Public Library which is part of the Peninsula Library System.

== Neighborhoods ==
The city's small downtown and several residential subdivisions, such as Mayfair Village, Sunshine Gardens, Avalon Park, Winston Manor, West Winston Manor, and Rancho Buri Buri, are located west of Highway 101, while the area east of Highway 101 is dominated by industrial complexes interspersed with modern office parks, particularly near the Oyster Point Marina on San Francisco Bay. The extreme western portions of the city near Interstate 280 sit along a hillside and offer views of San Francisco Bay. This area is known to local residents as Westborough. The southern part of the city, closest to the airport, is home to a large number of car repair shops, airport parking lots, and airport hotels.

Grand Avenue, between Spruce and Airport, is zoned "Downtown Core" by the City of South San Francisco, with various small shops and restaurants. Grand Avenue is host to a plethora of stores, one of which is Bronstein Music, a well-known local music store that has been around since 1946. City Hall is located on Grand Avenue, which, to the residents of South City, is known simply as "Grand." Grand also runs perpendicular with one of the city's other well-known streets, Linden, which connects San Bruno to Highway 101. Chestnut Avenue connects Hillside, the northern bordering street at the foot of San Bruno Mountain, to Westborough Blvd, and subsequently to one of the neighborhoods known as Westborough.

Besides the downtown, South San Francisco residents, officials, and local real-estate agencies identify the following neighborhoods:

- Avalon Park
- Brentwood
- Buri Buri
- Cypress/Airport
- East Side
- El Camino
- Francisco Terrace
- Lindenville
- Mayfair Village
- Mission Road
- Old Town
- Orange Park
- Oyster Point
- Paradise Valley
- Parkhaven
- Pecks Lot
- Serra Highlands
- Sign Hill
- Southwood
- Sterling Terrace
- Stonegate
- Susie Way
- Sunshine Gardens
- Terrabay
- Treasure Island
- West Winston Manor
- Westborough
- West Park
- Winston Manor

Students from Westborough and Buri Buri generally attend El Camino High School. The majority of Avalon, Brentwood, Sterling Terrace, Parkway inhabitants attend South San Francisco High School, as well as the East Side inhabitants. The same inhabitants are also divided among Westborough Middle School, Alta Loma Middle School and Parkway Heights Middle School, respectively.

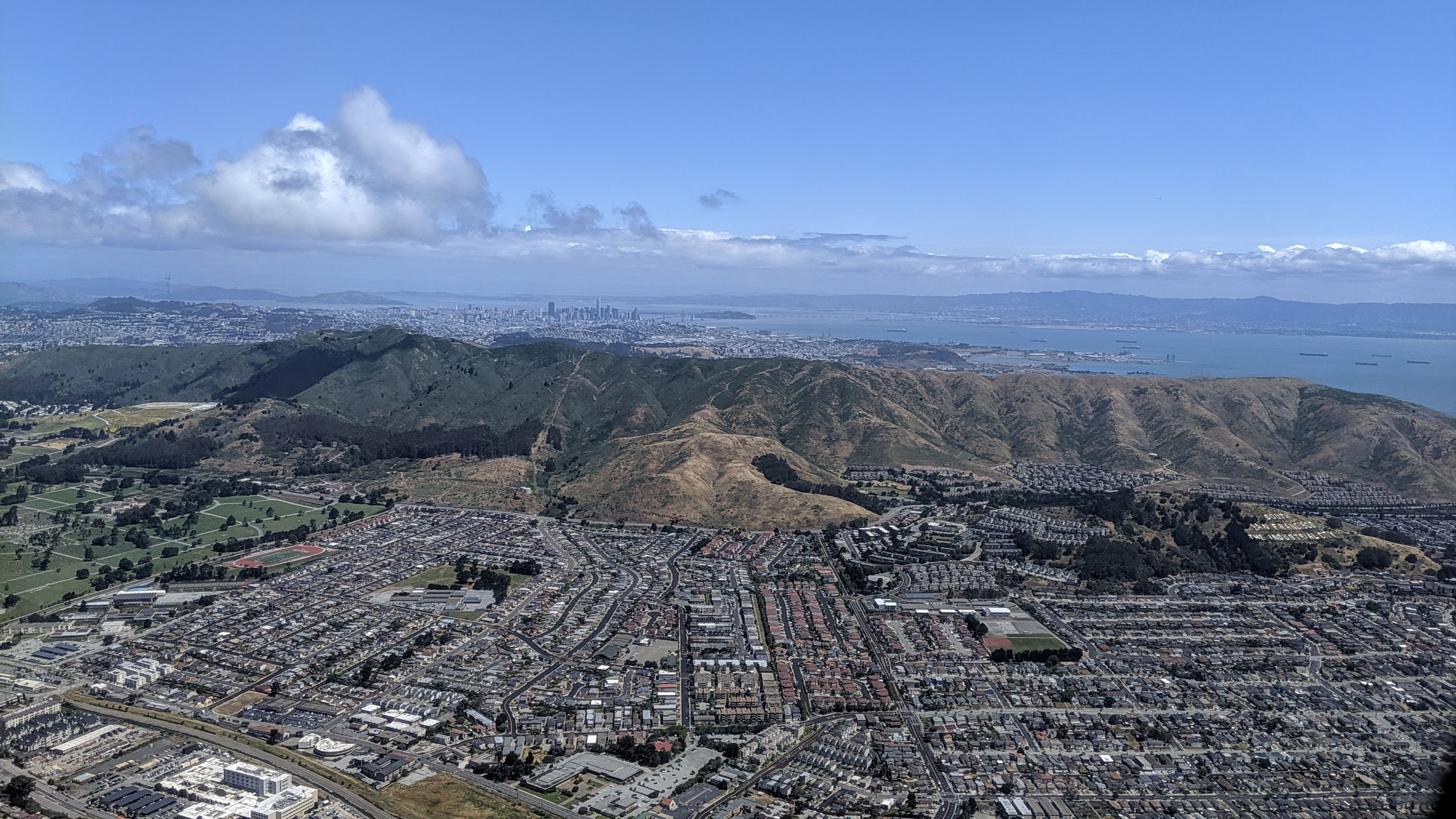
Aerial view of South San Francisco and San Bruno Mountain from the south

=== Nicknames ===
Nicknames for South San Francisco include "South City" (in reference to San Francisco's nickname of "The City") and "SSF".

== Recreation and places of interest ==
=== Sign Hill ===
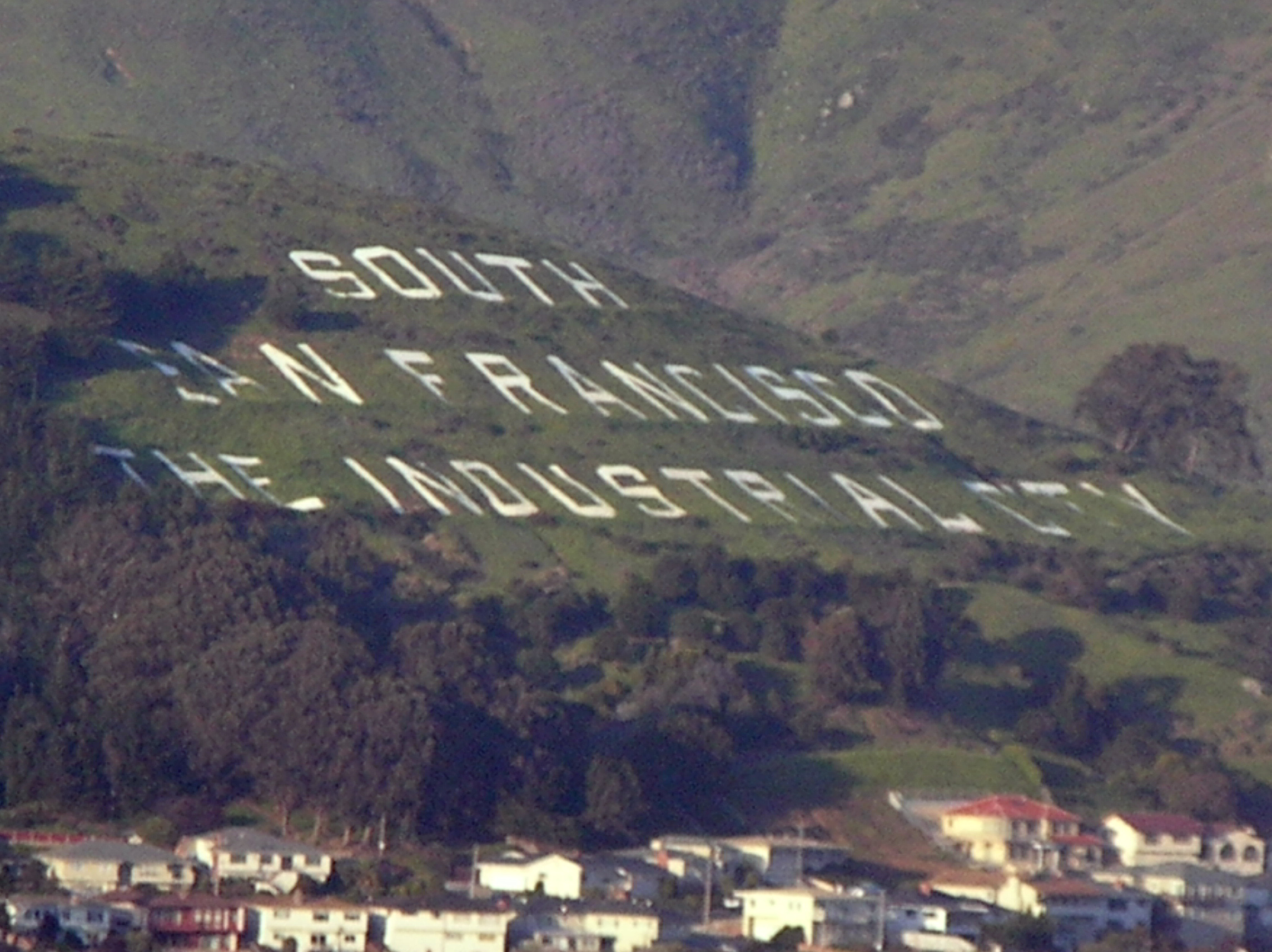
The "South San Francisco The Industrial City" sign

South San Francisco has a landmark visible to travelers along the San Francisco Peninsula or through the nearby San Francisco International Airport. Sign Hill, near San Bruno Mountain State Park, displays huge letters on its mountainside which reads "SOUTH SAN FRANCISCO THE INDUSTRIAL CITY." The letters are made of painted concrete and sit flush along the hillside. The sign was put up in the 1920s, and in 1996 was given a place in the National Register of Historic Places as an outstanding example of early 20th-Century "civic boosterism", a tribute to the past importance of heavy industry to the regional economy, and recognizing significant contributions the area made during World Wars I and II.

Sign Hill is a city park which provides hikers with access to the letters; the park includes 30 acres (12 ha) of open space and almost 2 miles (3.2 km) of hiking trails. During the 2020 pandemic, when access to many state and county parks and trails became restricted, the number of hikers climbing to the top of Sign Hill rose to more than thirty per day.

=== City Hall and major public buildings ===
The SSF City Hall is located at 400 Grand Avenue (37.656°N 122.413°W). The city purchased the Civic Center site in 1913 for $10,000 from the South San Francisco Land and Improvement Company. This property had been marked for nineteen prime home sites. The City Hall design was modeled after Philadelphia's Independence Hall's neo-colonial Georgian design. The city's Mayoral Office, City Manager's Office, City Clerk, Economic and Community Development, Finance and Human Resources services are located in City Hall; the Building department is next door (in the former Police department). A Municipal Services Building on Arroyo Drive near El Camino Real houses the Council Chambers, as well as event spaces. The Police Department is (starting 2022) housed in a dedicated newly constructed building at Chestnut Avenue and Antoinette Lane. Public Works is located on North Canal Street. There are five Fire Stations, with the headquarters in Station 61 on North Canal Street.

=== Other parks ===
South San Francisco has a number of other parks: Orange Memorial Park (37.653°N 122.427°W) offers baseball/softball fields, soccer fields, indoor swimming, picnic grounds, a sculpture garden, children's play equipment, tennis courts, basketball courts, bocce ball, and a skate park. It hosts a Saturday farmer's market (May–October), as well as the annual "Concert in the Park" in September. Alta Loma Park, Buri-Buri Park, Monte Verde Park, Paradise Valley, Sellick Park (37.643°N 122.450°W), and Westborough Park all include facilities for sports as well as picnics, and the Terrabay Recreation Center has a gymnasium. SSF Unified School District facilities are also available for sports, and the Boys and Girls Club of Northern San Mateo County is headquartered adjacent to Orange and Centennial Parks.

The city also has a park and marina along the shore of San Francisco Bay, named Oyster Point, which is also home to the private Oyster Point Yacht Club. South San Francisco has walkways and bike trails adjacent to the San Francisco Bay, from which runners are able to view San Francisco International Airport operations, fishermen may try their luck, while wind-surfers and kayakers may launch their watercraft. South San Francisco is home to many hotels as well, since it is close to San Francisco and next to SFO.

A unique opportunity was created when BART expanded down the Peninsula to create a "linear park" on the swath of undeveloped land on top of the tube. Running from Colma to Millbrae, South San Francisco's portion is three miles long, running through the center of town from the South San Francisco BART Station to the San Bruno BART Station (37.658°N 122.437°W). The Class I bicycle and pedestrian trail is a 10' wide asphalt pathway with 2' decomposed granite shoulders, irrigated for low-maintenance landscaping, with safety lighting, signalized intersections where the trail crosses Spruce and Chestnut Avenues, and in-ground flashing lights at Orange Avenue. Centennial Way Dog Park is located adjacent to Orange Park along the pathway. The pathway is called Centennial Way to commemorate the city's 100th birthday in 2008.

=== Other places of interest ===
The downtown area along Grand Avenue has buildings from the city's earliest days. Galli's Sanitary Bakery operated from 1909 until it closed in October 2016, while – a few blocks down – the 1905 Plymire-Schwartz house (37.6565°N 122.4169°W) was the North Peninsula's first hospital; it is now operated by the Historical Society. The 1920 city hall is modeled after Independence Hall in Philadelphia, while next to it sits the original 1916 Carnegie Library. The 1912 Metropolitan Hotel (built by the Meat Packers Consortium) now has a mural depicting SSF History high on its east wall. Bertolucci's is an Italian restaurant that has also been around almost since the birth of the city, located in close proximity to downtown South San Francisco and is easily seen from highway 101.

The South San Francisco Public Library (part of the Peninsula Library System) has served the city since 1917 with branches on Grand Avenue and on West Orange Avenue just off of Westborough. A new library facility is under construction at Chestnut Avenue next to El Camino Real; it is expected to open in 2023.

As well as the Plymire-Schwartz house, the SSF Historical Society operates a museum in a former Water Company facility on Chestnut Avenue; it houses a collection that includes artifacts, oral history tapes, historic documents, special exhibits, and has a database for researching historical photographs. The City Library also houses a collection of documents and photos in basement-level offices at the historic landmark Grand Avenue Library. The former Historic Preservation Commission placed descriptive markers at fifty locations throughout the city.

The South San Francisco Farmers Market is at Orange Memorial Park from May through November, 10:00 a.m. to 1:00 p.m. The market offers only California-grown products sold directly to consumers.

Every Holiday season residents of Parkway Estates (a three-street development built in the mid-1980s off Chestnut Avenue) decorate their houses and yards with Christmas lights. This display is open to the public, is well-known holiday attraction, and hundreds of visitors arrive every holiday season. Lilac Lane (off of Palm Avenue) was an earlier seasonal decoration cooperative which began in the 1960s, at one point it was the destination of the city's Santa Claus parade, and the spot where the local Chamber of Commerce Santa passed out toys from R. Dakin (formerly headquartered in SSF) to hundreds of children. Few of the original residents survive and decorative technology today has far surpassed the 1960s era, so, in the 21st century, Lilac Lane has become a backwater.

South San Francisco has one bowling alley now named Hometown Bowl on El Camino Real. There are several gyms which serve basketball, volleyball, and other indoor sports; both the high schools and the former Spruce Ave. high school open their gyms to the community when the school is not using them; Terrabay Gymnasium on San Bruno Mountain is also available. Tennis courts, outdoor basketball courts, and a bocce facility are maintained by the city. South San Francisco is also home to the private California Golf Club of San Francisco, next to its public library, bounded by Ponderosa Road and Westborough.

== Transportation ==
South San Francisco is adjacent to the San Francisco International Airport (SFO). A BART station, located directly adjacent to El Camino High School and Solaire Transit Village, provides near-express rapid transit service to SFO (with stops only in San Bruno and, on Red Line trains, Millbrae), as well as the cities of San Francisco, Oakland, Richmond, Antioch, Berkeley, Concord and Walnut Creek. BART supplements the Caltrain service between San Francisco and San Jose, with the latter's station adjacent to downtown on Grand Avenue. A second Caltrain station in South San Francisco, Butler Road at Oyster Point, was removed in 1983.

On June 4, 2012, the Water Emergency Transportation Authority began a ferry service between the South San Francisco Ferry Terminal at Oyster Point Marina and the east bay cities of Oakland at Jack London Square and Alameda at the Main Street ferry terminal. The ferry service operates during weekday commute hours only.

The city is served by several free shuttle services open to the general public:

1. A South City Shuttle provides service between South San Francisco BART and the city's downtown. It includes trips to local stores, the senior center, libraries, city hall and parks. The shuttle provides transit connections with both BART and SamTrans.
2. A shuttle linking the South San Francisco Ferry Terminal to the Utah/Grand Ave office area operates during commute hours, Monday through Friday.
3. A shuttle linking the South San Francisco Ferry Terminal to the Oyster Point office area operates during commute hours, Monday through Friday.

The city is transited by two major north–south freeways, U.S. Route 101 (the Bayshore Freeway), along the San Francisco Bay, and Interstate 280, along the hills of the Santa Cruz Mountains. The city also lies along the historic El Camino Real between Colma and San Bruno and is bordered on the west by Skyline Boulevard.

South San Francisco is also served by LimeBike, a dockless bike rental service.

== Notable people ==
- Victor Arnautoff: Painter (Linden PO mural).
- Enrico Banducci: Impresario
- Ken Bastida: Television journalist.
- Robert Bernardo: Politician.
- Rich Bordi: MLB player.
- John Broderick: Film director, producer, screenwriter.
- Alice Bulos: Asian-American leader.
- Willy Cahill: Olympic Judo coach.
- Jim Campilongo: Rock guitarist.
- Joe Carcione: Newspaper & broadcast columnist, greengrocer.
- Rue Randall Clifford: Early high school teacher, society leader.
- James H. Coleman: LGBT Councilmember.
- Marty DeMerritt: MLB coach.
- Aristides Demetrios: Wind-harp sculptor.
- Rachel Dutton: Microbiologist, food scientist.
- Alexia Estrada: Professional soccer player.
- Ronald Fields Jr.: Rapper.
- Jim Fregosi: MLB player and coach.
- Mike Futrell: Attorney, city manager.
- Oliver Gagliani: Photographer and teacher.
- Jerjer Gibson: Professional soccer player.
- Jenna Gozali: Badminton professional.
- Carl Gutierrez: former Governor of Guam
- Walt Harris: College football coach.
- Rene Herrerias: Teacher
- Milford Hodge: NFL player.
- Don Hoefler: Journalist.
- Patrick Hunter: NFL player.
- Lenore Jacobson: School principal, researcher.
- Greg Jones: NFL Running-back, Minnesota Viking.
- William J. Justice: Catholic bishop.
- Philip N. Lilienthal: banker, founder - Bank of South San Francisco.
- Sebastian Lletget: Professional soccer player.
- Charles Lux: Major rancher-businessman.
- A. V. Macan: Designer of California Golf Club (1925).
- Edgar Malepeai: Idaho politician.
- Bill Martin: Artist.
- Barry McGee: Artist.
- Gene Mullin: Politician and teacher.
- Kevin Mullin: Politician.
- Rex Navarrete: Filipino comedian.
- Eduardo Pedemonte: Soccer player for Guam.
- Franklin Rhoda: Presbyterian minister 1890s.
- Jessie Rogers: Adult film star.
- F. James Rutherford: Science educator.
- Roger Ruzek : NFL player.
- Leo Ryan: Politician, assassinated while visiting Jonestown.
- José de la Cruz Sánchez: Californio owner of Rancho Buri-buri
- Herman Segelke: Major League baseball pitcher.
- Mike Solari: NFL coach.
- Aaron Solo Professional wrestler (AEW).
- Masayoshi Son: Japanese-Korean entrepreneur.
- Bruce Steivel: Choreographer, ballet director.
- Henry Stelling: Air Force Major General.
- Gustavus Franklin Swift: Founder.
- Bonnie Lynn Tempesta: Gourmet baker.
- Ralph Thomlinson: sociologist.
- Darren Uyenoyama: MMA professional.
- Easop Winston: NFL player.
- Francis Wong: Jazz musician.
- Ya Boy: Rapper.
- Kurt Yaeger: actor, disability advocate.
- Jim Zylker: Olympic & professional soccer player.

== Sister cities ==
South San Francisco has five sister cities:

- Atotonilco, Mexico
- Kishiwada, Japan
- Lucca, Italy
- Pasig, Philippines
- Saint-Jean-Pied-de-Port, France
