= Herman Segelke =

American baseball player (born 1958)

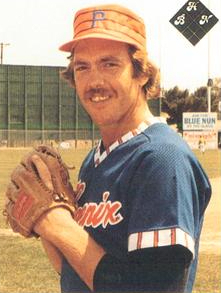
- Segelke with the Phoenix Giants c. 1983
- Pitcher
- Born: April 24, 1958 (age 68); San Mateo, California, U.S.
- Died: September 21, 2026
- Batted: Right Threw: Right

MLB debut
- April 7, 1982, for the Chicago Cubs

Last MLB appearance
- April 23, 1982, for the Chicago Cubs

MLB statistics
- Win–loss record: 0–0
- Earned run average: 8.31
- Strikeouts: 4
- Stats at Baseball Reference

Teams
- Chicago Cubs (1982)

Herman Neils Segelke (/sɛˈɡɛlkiː/ seh-GHEL-kee; born April 24, 1958) is an American former pitcher in Major League Baseball.

Segelke is the third of four children. He is German and Danish descent. He won the national Punt, Pass, and Kick competition at the 1969 Pro Bowl.

Segelke played baseball at El Camino High School in South San Francisco, California. He suffered tendonitis in his pitching arm as a junior but, in his first start as a senior, with a dozen professional scouts present, Segelke threw a no-hitter against San Mateo High School.

Segelke received a scholarship offer to play college baseball at Arizona but was drafted with the seventh pick of the 1976 Major League Baseball draft by the Chicago Cubs on the recommendation of scout Gene Handley. Segelke held out for a larger signing bonus and ultimately was given a $52,500 bonus (equivalent to $297,000 in 2025), then the largest bonus ever given by the Cubs.

He appeared in three games for the Chicago Cubs in 1982. He was traded to the San Francisco Giants following the 1982 season, where he played two seasons in their farm system before finishing his professional career in 1984.
