= Mike Solari =

American football player and coach (born 1955)

Personal information
- Born: January 16, 1955 (age 71); Daly City, California, U.S.

Career information
- High school: El Camino (South San Francisco, California)
- College: San Diego State

Career history
- Mission Bay High School (CA) (1976–1977) Offensive line coach; MiraCosta (1978) Offensive line coach; United States International (1979) Offensive line coach; Boise State (1980) Offensive line coach; Cincinnati (1981–1982) Offensive line coach; Kansas (1983–1985) Offensive line coach; Pittsburgh (1986) Offensive coordinator & offensive line coach; Dallas Cowboys (1987–1988) Assistant offensive line coach & special teams coach; Phoenix Cardinals (1989) Offensive line coach; Alabama (1990–1991) Offensive line coach; San Francisco 49ers (1992–1996) Tight ends coach & assistant offensive line coach; Kansas City Chiefs (1997–2005) Offensive line coach; Kansas City Chiefs (2006–2007) Offensive coordinator; Seattle Seahawks (2008–2009) Offensive line coach; San Francisco 49ers (2010–2014) Offensive line coach; Green Bay Packers (2015) Assistant offensive line coach; New York Giants (2016–2017) Offensive line coach; Seattle Seahawks (2018–2021) Offensive line coach; Dallas Cowboys (2023–2024) Offensive line coach

Awards and highlights
- Super Bowl champion (XXIX); NCAA Division I-AA national champion (1980)
- Coaching profile at Pro Football Reference

Mike Solari (born January 16, 1955) is an American football coach and former player. Solari has previously worked for five other National Football League (NFL) teams, including a stint as offensive coordinator of the Kansas City Chiefs from 2006 to 2007. He played collegiately as an offensive lineman at San Diego State University.

== Playing career ==
Solari got his start as playing both ways at El Camino High School in South San Francisco, California (Class of 1973), where he was a standout, particularly on the offensive side of the ball (tackle). His next stop was as an offensive lineman at College of San Mateo. He then moved onto San Diego State, where his teammates included two other JC transfers, future NFL head coaches Herman Edwards and John Fox.

== Coaching career ==
After SDSU, Solari coached at the high school level in Southern California, for the Mission Bay Pirates in the Pacific Beach sector of San Diego, and as a wrestling and assistant track coach at Orange Glen High School in 1978–79. Next he began his college coaching career at nearby MiraCosta College, a community college in Oceanside. He then went to United States International University (USIU) as an assistant football coach on Tom Walsh's staff.

Solari spent time at Boise State, Cincinnati, Alabama, Kansas and Pittsburgh as assistant football coach.

He was with the Dallas Cowboys as assistant offensive line coach and special teams coach.

Solari joined the San Francisco 49ers in 1992 as tight ends coach and assistant offensive line coach. There he won a Super Bowl ring as a member of 1994 49ers coaching staff.

In 1997, he joined the Kansas City Chiefs as their O-line coach. And for many years, tutored some of the best lineman in the NFL, including Pro Football Hall of Famers Will Shields and Willie Roaf. Upon the retirement of Dick Vermeil and the signing of incumbent OC Al Saunders by Washington, Solari was promoted to offensive coordinator in 2006. After the conclusion of the 2007 season, Solari was fired by the Chiefs following a 4–12 season and was replaced by former Georgia Tech head coach and long-time NFL coach Chan Gailey.

Solari joined the Seahawks staff in 2008, he changed its offensive line scheme to more zone blocking.

On January 21, 2010, Solari was named offensive line coach for the San Francisco 49ers.

Solari joined the Packers staff as an offensive line assistant following the 2014 season.

On January 21, 2016, Solari was hired by the New York Giants as offensive line coach.

On January 15, 2018, Solari was rehired by the Seattle Seahawks as their offensive line coach.

On February 5, 2023, Solari returned to the Dallas Cowboys, being hired as the team's offensive line coach.
