= San Bruno Creek =

Stream in California, United States

San Bruno Creek (Spanish for: "St. Brun") is an intermittent stream that rises on the eastern slopes of the Northern Santa Cruz Mountains in San Mateo County, California, US. The headwaters descend a relatively steep canyon east of Skyline Boulevard in a tortuous course. Comparison of topographic maps from 1896 and 1939 illustrates the extreme modification in the lower reaches due to urban development from the rapidly expanding population. The San Bruno Creek watershed was originally settled by a tribe of the Ohlone, and later this locale was part of the Spanish missions' landholdings.

A hiking trail winds along San Bruno Creek representing an important link in the San Francisco Bay Trail; in fact, this link is needed to make up for lack of access along a large bay front area occupied exclusively by San Francisco International Airport; thus, the Bay Trail must detour a full two miles (3 km) inland from the bay to meet the San Bruno Creek Trail.

== History ==
Prehistorically the banks of San Bruno Creek were settled by the Buriburi tribe of the Ohlone, who have presumably lived in the area since as early as 2000 BC. One Buriburi settlement has been identified along San Bruno Creek, which may have had a population of 15 to 25 people. This watershed was first explored by Europeans in 1769 by a Spanish expedition led by Gaspar de Portolà. Later, more extensive explorations by Bruno Hecate resulted in the naming of San Bruno Creek after St. Bruno of Cologne, the founder of a medieval monastic order. This creek later gave its name to the community.

With the establishment of the San Francisco de Asís (St. Francis of Assisi) mission, much of the catchment basin became pasture for grazing mission livestock. Following the decline of the missions, the San Bruno Creek watershed became part of Rancho Buri Buri granted to José de la Cruz Sánchez, the eleventh Alcalde (mayor) of San Francisco. Dairy farms later became common in much of the area.

One of the earliest maps showing San Bruno Creek appeared in 1893, prepared by Andrew Cowper Lawson, professor of geology at the University of California, Berkeley. At that time San Bruno Creek was drawn as sharing headwaters with another creek which drained away from the bay into what is now called Crystal Springs Reservoir. Later development of the reservoir by the city of San Francisco and lower reach urbanization by the city of San Bruno modified greatly the upper and lower reaches of the watercourse.

Above the intersection of Interstate 280 and Interstate 380, the creek runs through Crestmoor Canyon and the Crestmoor residential neighborhood, which was the site of the 2010 San Bruno gas pipeline explosion and fire.

== Upper reach ==
The upper one and a half miles (2,400 m) of San Bruno Creek is the most rugged and natural reach as the stream winds through steep canyons of about 45 degrees in slope. The underlying geological formation of this upper catchment basin is Pleistocene Colma Formation, which continues eastward in the basin under most of the San Francisco Bay Flood Plain. Principal flows of the creek are within the winter months of November to March, the only season of meaningful rainfall in the Bay Area. Groundwater in the middle to upper basin varies between about 70 to 150 feet (21 to 46 metres), and flows generally eastward toward the Bay. This wooded upper reach watershed consists of a mixed oak woodland with coast live oak, Quercus agrifolia, as a dominant species. Other larger plants are the California Bay Laurel and the understory species Toyon. The understory also includes the following wildflowers: evening primrose (Renothera ovata), wild radish (Raphanus satira), wild cucumber (Marah fabaceus), scotch broom (Cytisus scoparius), miners lettuce (Montia perfoliata), fillaree (Erodium cicutarium), vetch (Vicia americana), sweet clover (Melilotus indicus), lupine (Lupinus sp.), and California poppy (Eschscholzia californica).

== See also ==
- Colma Creek
- The Shops at Tanforan
- List of watercourses in the San Francisco Bay Area
