= Jerjer Gibson =

Liberian footballer (born 1991)

Jerjer Q. Gibson
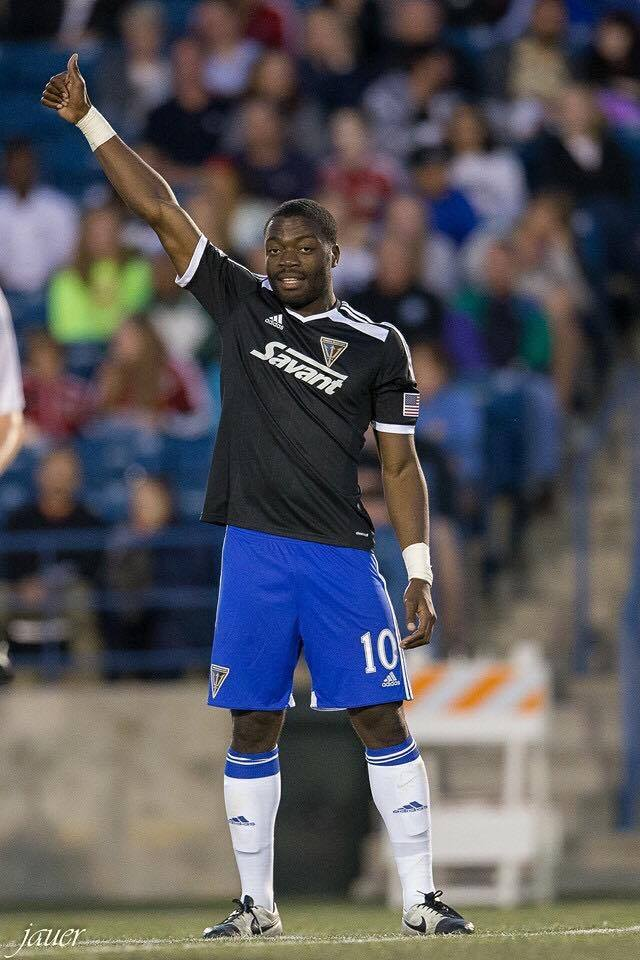

Personal information
- Full name: Jerjer Quemine Gibson
- Date of birth: 14 March 1991 (age 35)
- Place of birth: Monrovia, Liberia
- Height: 6 ft 2 in (1.88 m)
- Position: Forward

Youth career
- 2006–2007: Junior Pro Rollers
- 2007–2008: Lanco United
- 2007–2008: El Camino Colts
- 2008–2010: McCaskey Red Tornado

College career
Years	Team	Apps	(Gls)
2011–2012	Wilmington Wildcats	18	(9)

Senior career*
Years	Team	Apps	(Gls)
2013–2014	Pennsylvania Roar (indoor)	24	(12)
2014–2015	Baltimore Blast (indoor)	12	(9)
2012–2013	Virginia Beach Piranhas	28	(19)
2014–2015	Virginia Beach City FC	32	(19)
2015–2017	Syracuse Silver Knights (indoor)	29	(14)
2017	Syracuse FC	8	(0)
2017–2019	St. Louis Ambush (indoor)	30	(17)
2019–2020	Harrisburg Heat (indoor)	18	(9)
2021	St. Louis Ambush (indoor)	6	(3)
2021–2022	Harrisburg Heat (indoor)	4	(1)
- * Club domestic league appearances and goals as of 15 December 2022

Jerjer Q. Gibson (born 14 March 1991), or simply Jerjer, is a Liberian professional footballer who plays as a forward.

Previously, he played professionally for the Syracuse Silver Knights.

On 5 October 2017 the St. Louis Ambush announced they signed him for the upcoming season.

He joined the Harrisburg Heat on 16 May 2019.
