= Roger Ruzek =

American gridiron football player (born 1960)

No. 9, 7
- Position: Placekicker

Personal information
- Born: December 17, 1960 (age 65); San Francisco, California, U.S.
- Listed height: 6 ft 1 in (1.85 m)
- Listed weight: 185 lb (84 kg)

Career information
- High school: El Camino (South San Francisco, California)
- College: Weber State
- NFL draft: 1983: undrafted

Career history
- Cleveland Browns (1983)*; Pittsburgh Steelers (1983); New Jersey Generals (1984–1985); Dallas Cowboys (1987–1989); Philadelphia Eagles (1989–1993); San Francisco 49ers (1994)*; San Jose SaberCats (1996); London Monarchs (1996)
- * Offseason or practice squad member only

Awards and highlights
- 4× All-Big Sky (1979–1982)

Career NFL statistics
- Field goals: 120
- Field goal attempts: 166
- Field goal %: 72.3
- Longest field goal: 53
- Stats at Pro Football Reference
- Stats at ArenaFan.com

Roger Brian Ruzek (born December 17, 1960) is an American former professional football player who was a placekicker in the National Football League (NFL) for the Dallas Cowboys and the Philadelphia Eagles. He also was a member of the New Jersey Generals in the United States Football League (USFL). He played college football for the Weber State Wildcats.

== Early life ==
Ruzek attended El Camino High School, where he played football, soccer and baseball.

He accepted a football scholarship at Weber State University, where he became a four-year starter and received All-Big Sky honors in every season. As a senior, he set a school record and led the NCAA Division I-AA in field goal accuracy (16-19, 84.2%).

His 46 career field goals, and 221 career extra points were NCAA Division I-AA records. He also set different school records: 4 field goals in a game, 30 consecutive extra points, which at the time were the best in school history. He made a 51 yard field goal, which was the second longest in school history at the time.

== Professional career ==
=== Cleveland Browns ===
Ruzek was signed as an undrafted free agent by the Cleveland Browns after the 1983 NFL draft. On August 17, he was waived after he couldn't unseat the incumbent kicker Matt Bahr.

=== New Jersey Generals (USFL) ===
After being out of football for a year, he received a tryout invitation from the New Jersey Generals of the United States Football League, performing well enough to be named the starter kicker for the 1984 season. His first field goal was a 51-yarder. In 1986, the team folded along with the rest of the league.

In two seasons, he made 34 of 48 (70.8%) field goal attempts and 100 of 105 extra point attempts (95.2%) for 202 points.

=== Dallas Cowboys ===
In November 1986, the Dallas Cowboys gave him a tryout. In 1987 he was signed as a free agent, to compete for the kicker position after Rafael Septien was released. In training camp, he was the first Cowboys player to be cut on August 6, after struggling with a right ankle injury. On August 19, He was re-signed and eventually won the kicking competition. He made 22 of 25 (88%) field goal attempts, ranking second in the NFL and breaking a franchise record. His 92 points tied for fourth in the league among kickers. Against the New York Giants he tied an NFL record with 4 field goals made in one quarter (the most ever made in a fourth quarter). Against the Los Angeles Rams, he set a franchise mark with 5 field goals made (tied by Eddie Murray in 1993).

In 1988, he had a contract holdout during the preseason and was replaced by Luis Zendejas in the first two games of the season. He rejoined the team on September 13. He struggled to regain his form, finishing with 12-of-22 (54.5%) field goal attempts.

In 1989, he made only 5-of-11 field goals (45.5%), before being released on November 7. He was replaced with Zendejas.

=== Philadelphia Eagles ===
On November 22, 1989, Ruzek signed as a free agent with the Philadelphia Eagles to replace a struggling Steve DeLine. He made 8-of 11 (72.7%) field goals.

In 1990, he hit 21-of-29 (72.4%) field goals and made a 53-yard field goal, which at the time was the third-longest in franchise history. He also made 45-of-48 (93.8%) extra points.

In 1991, he made 28-of-33 (84.8%) field goals, with a long of 51 yards and 27-of-29 (93.1%) extra points.

In 1993, the team signed Matt Bahr after Ruzek strained his right hamstring, while making a game-winning 30-yard field goal with time running out against the Green Bay Packers. He was released two weeks later on September 24, when the team decided to replace him with Bahr. He was re-signed on December 14, after Bahr struggled missing 5 of his last 8 field goal attempts. He finished making 8-of-10 (80%) in field goals and 13-of-16 (81.3%) extra points, including a game winner against the San Francisco 49ers.

On July 28, 1994, he was released to make room for veteran kicker Eddie Murray.

=== San Francisco 49ers ===
In 1994, he was signed by the San Francisco 49ers. On July 28, he was cut after the team decided to keep rookie third round draft choice Doug Brien.

=== San Jose SaberCats (AFL) ===
In 1996, Ruzek signed with the San Jose SaberCats of the Arena Football League, making 3 out of 8 field goals and 11 out of 12 extra points.

=== London Monarchs (WLAF) ===
In 1996, he played with the London Monarchs of the World League of American Football, making 8 of 11 field goals (72.7%).

== Personal life ==
Ruzek was given the classic nickname "Who Framed Roger Ruzek" (after the movie Who Framed Roger Rabbit) by sportscaster Chris Berman. He was a teammate of Herschel Walker with three different teams (Generals, Cowboys and Eagles).
