= Alice Bulos =

Professor and politician

- Born: March 31, 1930; Cabanatuan, Nueva Ecija, Philippine Islands
- Died: October 21, 2016 (aged 86); Daly City, California
- Education: University of Santo Tomas
- Occupations: Professor, community organizer
- Political party: Democratic Party

Alice Peña Bulos (née Peña; March 31, 1930 – October 21, 2016) was a Filipino American professor, civil rights leader, and leader of the Asian American movement. She was a member of the Democratic Party and represented California in five Democratic National Conventions.

== Early life and education ==
Bulos was born on March 31, 1930 in Nueva Ecija, Philippines. She attended the University of Santo Tomas (UST) in Manila in 1948, graduating with a bachelor's and master's degree in social and behavioral sciences.

== Career ==
=== Professor in the Philippines ===
Bulos began her professional career as professor of sociology at UST and eventually became the Chairman of the Department of Sociology, teaching from 1951 to 1971 at the University of Santo Tomas.

=== Civic involvement in the US ===
Bulos moved to the United States in 1972. Bulos served as Commissioner for the San Mateo County Commission on the Status of Women and the Health Plan of San Mateo County. She has served as a board member for numerous community organizations and agencies. From 1993 to 2000, she served the Federal Council on Aging, as an appointee of President Bill Clinton. In 2006, she was honored as the Woman of the Year for the 19th Assembly District of California for actively pushing for the address of several issues such as domestic violence, health care, and the US residency application process. She has been honored as Women Warrior of the Year by the Pacific Asian American Women Bay area Coalition and has been inducted into the San Mateo County Women's Hall of Fame.

She was dubbed as "Grand Dame of Filipino–American Politics" by the media.

She was founding president of the Thomasians USA, a University of Santo Tomas alumni organization in the United States, which she led until her death in 2016.

== Death and legacy ==
Bulos died on October 21, 2016 after she was rushed to the Seton Medical Center in Daly City, California. She died of heart failure.

A library in South San Francisco, California and a stretch of the California State Route 35 are named in her honor. California Assemblyman Phil Ting sponsored the bill to rename the highway after Bulos. A community center in South San Francisco was also renamed in her honor.
