= Henry Stelling =

United States Army major general (1924–2021)

Henry B. Stelling Jr.
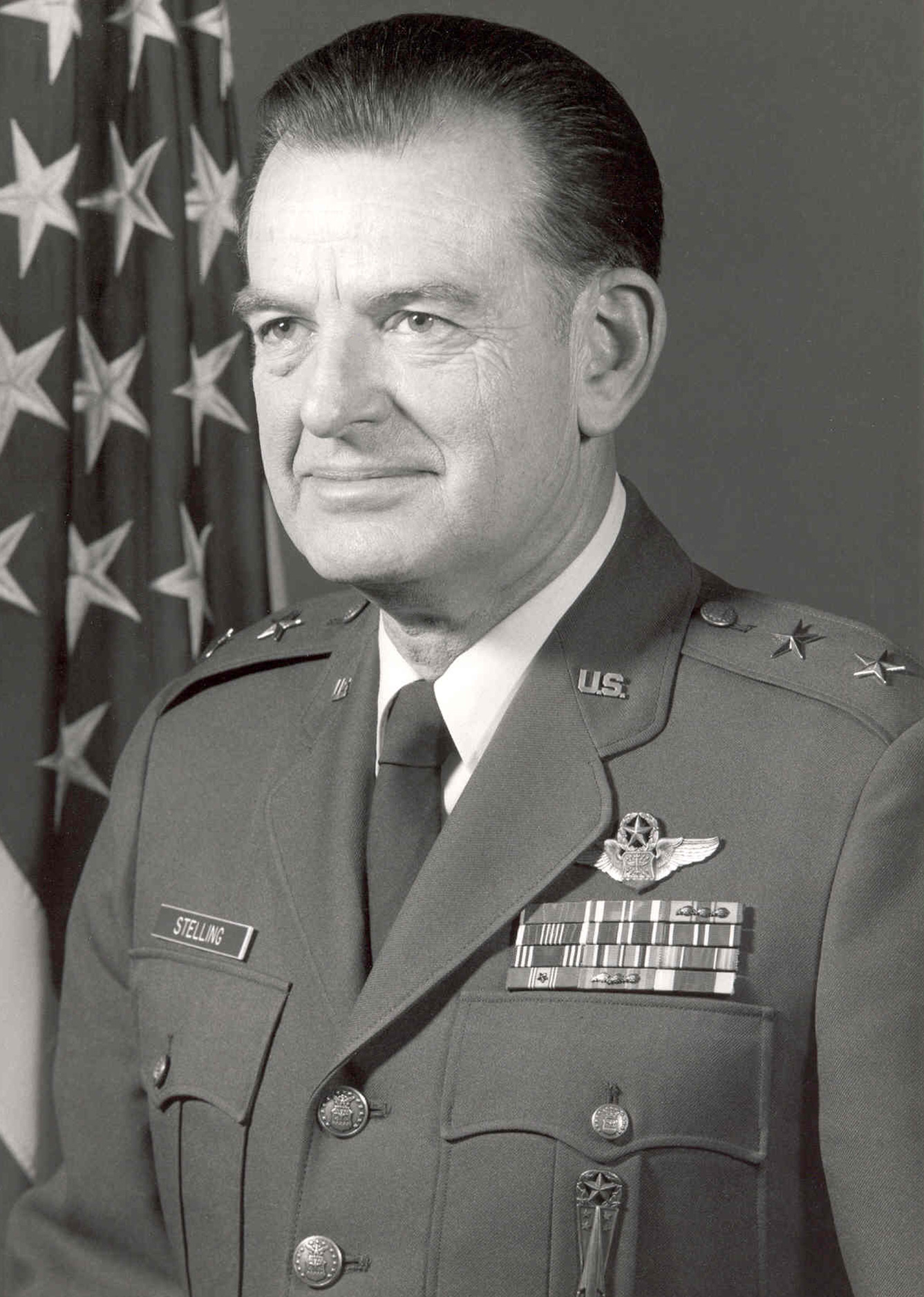
- Official portrait
- Nickname: Hank
- Born: July 9, 1924; South San Francisco, California, U.S.
- Died: September 20, 2021 (aged 97) Costa Mesa, California, U.S.
- Allegiance: United States of America
- Branch: United States Air Force
- Service years: 1948–1980
- Rank: Major general
- Commands: Vice Commander Electronic Systems Division
- Conflicts: Cold War
- Awards: Distinguished Service Medal (2); Legion of Merit; Distinguished Flying Cross; Air Medal
- Other work: Aerospace executive

Henry Barthold Stelling Jr. (July 9, 1924 – September 20, 2021) was a United States Army major general who served as Vice Commander of the Electronic Systems Division, Air Force Systems Command from 1978 to 1980. He graduated from the United States Military Academy in 1948. Stelling died in Costa Mesa, California, on September 20, 2021, at the age of 97.
