= Robert Bernardo =

American politician

Harbor Commissioner San Mateo County, California
- In office January 11, 2011 – January 2019

Personal details
- Born: 1968 (age 57–58) Philippines
- Party: Democratic
- Education: University of California, Davis
- Occupation: Communications Division roles, Port of Oakland

Robert Bernardo is an American politician and a member of the San Mateo County Harbor Commission. He was elected on November 2, 2010, with 79,008 votes from the 20 cities and 18 unincorporated towns that comprise San Mateo County, California. He was re-elected for another four-year term 2014 - 2018.

== Biography and career ==
Robert Bernardo was born in the Philippines to Rodolfo and Bituin Bernardo in 1968. Bernardo, the oldest son of a businessman and medical doctor, emigrated to the United States when he was 2 years old, and spent his childhood in the cities of Daly City, Pacifica and South San Francisco. Bernardo attended Junipero Serra High School in San Mateo, studied at the University of California, Davis and in 1991 received his B.A. degree in English.

Upon graduation, Bernardo began a career in journalism. He later worked at San Francisco non-profit organizations before working at the San Francisco District Attorney's Office as a criminal investigator. From 2002 Bernardo has worked full-time at the Port of Oakland, initially as a community relations officer and then in the communications division. He was promoted to Director of Communications in July 2021.

== Political career ==
Bernardo began his political career on the South San Francisco Personnel Board, where he served for three years before being appointed to the Planning Commission by the South San Francisco City Council. After serving three years on the Planning Commission, Bernardo decided to run for countywide office, for the San Mateo County Harbor Commission.

=== Harbor Commission Election 2010 ===
When San Mateo County Harbor Commissioner Ken S. Lundie decided not to run for another term, three political newcomers decided to run for Lundie's open seat. Harbor Commission candidates included Robert Bernardo, Sabrina Brennan, and William Klear. The other available seat was held by incumbent and former Daly City Mayor Jim Tucker. During the midterm election on November 2, 2010, Bernardo received the most votes with 79,008 votes (33.2%), followed by Tucker with 70,865 votes (29.8%), Brennan with 61,222 votes (25.7%) and Klear with 26,743 (11.2%). Bernardo was sworn in on January 11, 2011, by his mother, Dr. Bituin Bernardo. Bernardo became the first Filipino elected to the San Mateo County Harbor Commission and he is also the highest-ranking Filipino and openly gay official in the U.S.

=== Harbor Commission Election 2014 ===
Bernardo was reelected in November 2014 in a tight race. Although he initially conceded on election night, the final vote tally showed that Bernardo had won by 292 votes. He did not run for a further term as harbor commissioner in 2018.

=== Appointment Track Record ===
In 2012 Bernardo's top choice for appointment to the San Mateo County Harbor District board of commissioners was Linda Koelling, to fill Commissioner Sally Campbell's seat. In 2013 Bernardo voted to appoint William Holsinger to fill Commissioner Leo Padreddii's seat. In both instances, 2012 and 2013, William Holsinger was appointed.

In November 2015 Bernardo voted to appoint Virginia Chang Kiraly to fill Commissioner Nicole David's seat.

=== Board Officer ===
Bernardo served as president of the Harbor Commission in 2013. He was elected as vice president of the Harbor Board of Commissioners in January 2018.

=== Other achievements ===
Bernardo was named Grand Marshal of the 2006 San Francisco Lesbian, Gay, Bisexual, and Transgender Pride Parade. He received the most votes in a field of nine candidates. Earlier that year, Bernardo was also selected as a “Top 40 Business Leader Under 40” by the Business Times newspaper. Bernardo is also a triple titleholder in beauty pageants, having won Mr. Pacific Friends San Francisco 1992, Mr. Gay Asian Pacific Alliance 1993, and First Runner-Up Mr. Asian International 1994.

=== Personal life ===
Bernardo was baptized as a Roman Catholic and attended Christian school (elementary through senior high), but converted to Judaism while in his mid-30s. He is active in the local Jewish community and his volunteer work includes speaking engagements at local high schools, college campuses and local businesses from topics that range from hate crime prevention to gay spirituality to running for public office. Bernardo is also fluent in Tagalog and French.
