= James H. Coleman =

American politician

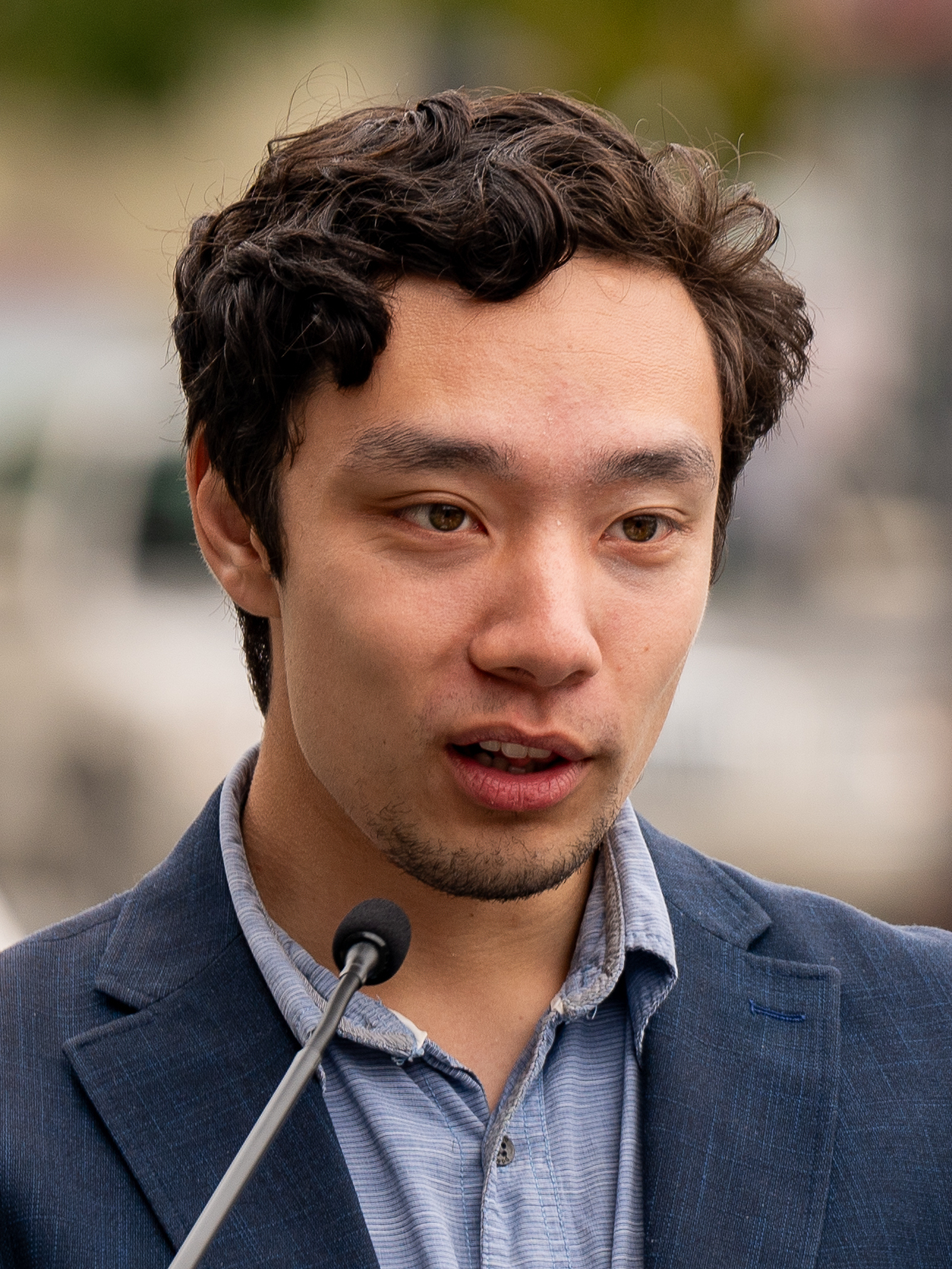
- Coleman in 2024

Member of the South San Francisco City Council from District 4
- Incumbent
- Assumed office December 9, 2020
- Preceded by: Richard Garbarino

Mayor of South San Francisco
- In office December 5, 2023 – December 10, 2024
- Preceded by: Buenaflor Nicolas
- Succeeded by: Eddie Flores

Personal details
- Born: June 3, 1999 (age 26) South San Francisco, California, U.S.
- Party: Democratic
- Education: Harvard University (BA)

James Hsuchen Coleman (Chinese: 柯文建; born June 3, 1999) is an American politician currently representing District 4 on the South San Francisco City Council. Elected at the age of 21, he is one of the youngest elected officials in the United States.

== Early life and education ==
Coleman was born in South San Francisco. His mother is a Taiwanese immigrant who works as a lab technician at Kaiser Permanente. His father was a FedEx worker and died when James was 16. Coleman graduated from South San Francisco High School in 2017, and from Harvard University in 2021.

At Harvard, Coleman majored in human developmental and regenerative biology with a minor in government. He conducted undergraduate research in the Sahay Lab, a neuroscience laboratory at Massachusetts General Hospital. Coleman was also active in Harvard's fossil fuel divestment campaign from 2018 to 2020, in which Harvard announced their intentions to divest on September 9, 2021.

== Political career ==
Coleman was elected to the South San Francisco City Council in the middle of his senior year at college in 2020, defeating 18-year incumbent Richard Garbarino with 52.27% of the vote. He became the city's youngest ever and first openly LGBTQ+ council member.

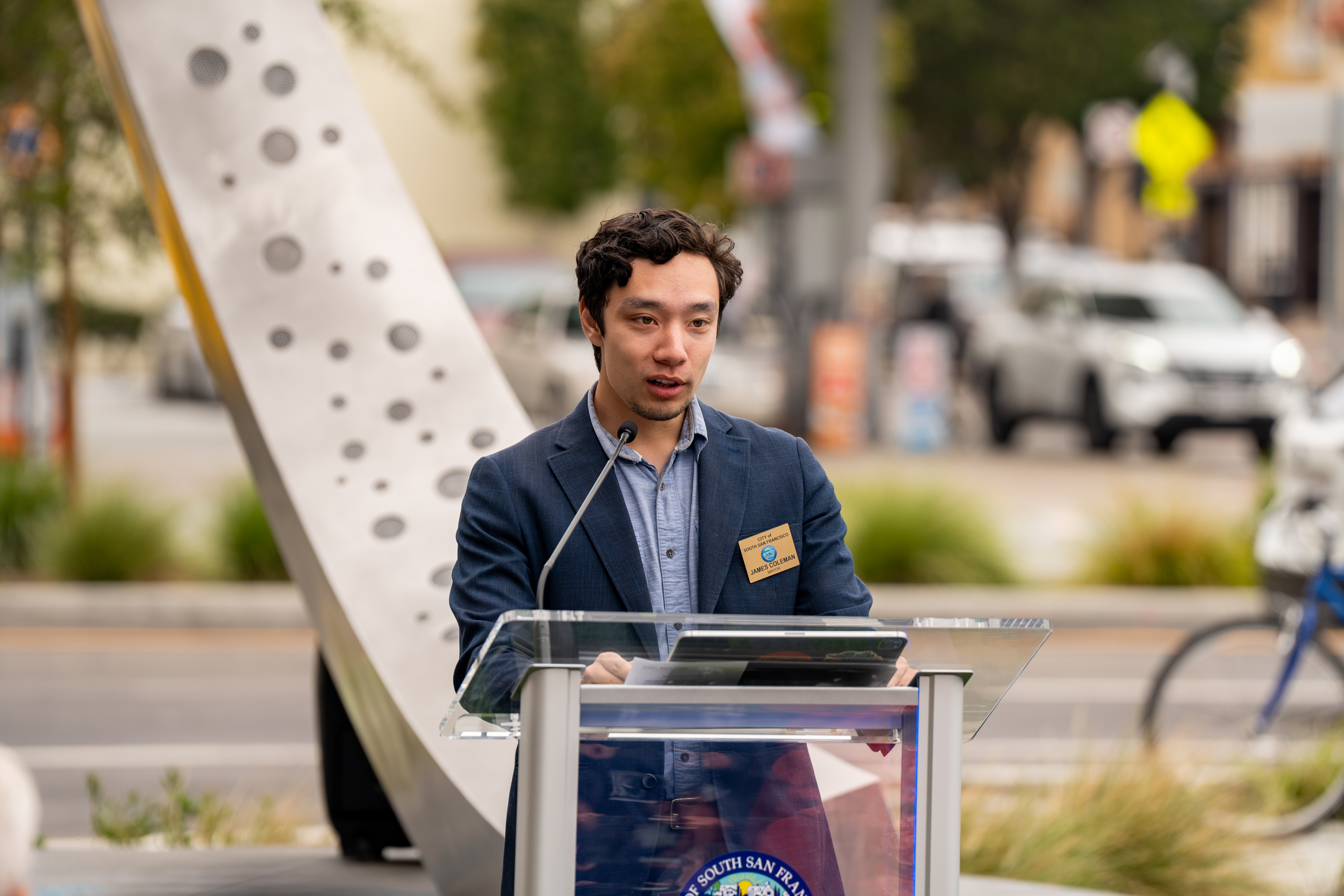
Mayor James Coleman speaks at Caltrain Electrification Groundbreaking

On the city council, Coleman has led the passage of a $5 Hazard Pay ordinance for grocery workers, and worked with Mark Nagales to establish a Universal Basic Income pilot program providing $500 per month for 12 months to 160 families.

On December 7, 2021, Coleman announced a run for California State Assembly, to succeed incumbent Kevin Mullin. Mullin was not seeking reelection, instead running for Congress following Jackie Speier's announcement that she would not run for reelection in 2022. On June 7, 2022, Coleman was defeated in the primary by San Mateo Mayor Diane Papan, who went on to win the general election.

In 2022, Coleman successfully led the passage of Measure AA to allow the City of South San Francisco build or acquire city-owned affordable housing, or social housing. On November 8, 2022, Measure AA passed with 58.85% of voters voting yes.

Coleman identifies as a democratic socialist.
