= Ralph Thomlinson =

- Born: February 12, 1925
- Died: February 8, 2007 (aged 81); South San Francisco, California
- Occupation: Sociologist
- Known for: Demography research
- Children: 2

Ralph Thomlinson (February 12, 1925 – February 8, 2007) was an American sociologist and demographer.

Thomlinson served in the U.S. Army during World War II. Subsequently, he earned his B.A. from Oberlin College in 1948, his M.A. from Yale University in 1949, and his Ph.D. from Columbia University in 1960. He was a faculty member at California State University, Los Angeles from 1959 until his retirement in 1988, serving as department chair from 1967 to 1969.

== Bibliography ==
- Population dynamics; causes and consequences of world demographic change (1965)
- Sociological concepts and research; acquisition, analysis, and interpretation of social information (1965)
- Demographic problems; controversy over population control (1967)
- Urban structure; the social and spatial character of cities (1969)
- Thailand's population; facts, trends, problems, and policies (1971)
