= Rancho Buri Buri =

Mexican land grant in California

Coordinates: 37.610°N 122.410°W

Rancho Buri Buri (also called Sánchez Rancho) was a 14,639-acre (59.24 km^{2}) Mexican land grant in present-day San Mateo County, California, given in 1835 by Governor José Castro to José Antonio Sánchez. The name derives from the Urebure village of the Ramaytush speaking Yelamu tribe of Ohlone people who were settled by the banks of San Bruno Creek. Rancho Buri Buri extended between the north line of South San Francisco and the middle of Burlingame, and from the San Francisco Bay to the top of the Peninsula ridge and included present-day Lomita Park, Millbrae, South San Francisco, San Bruno, and the northern part of Burlingame.

== History ==
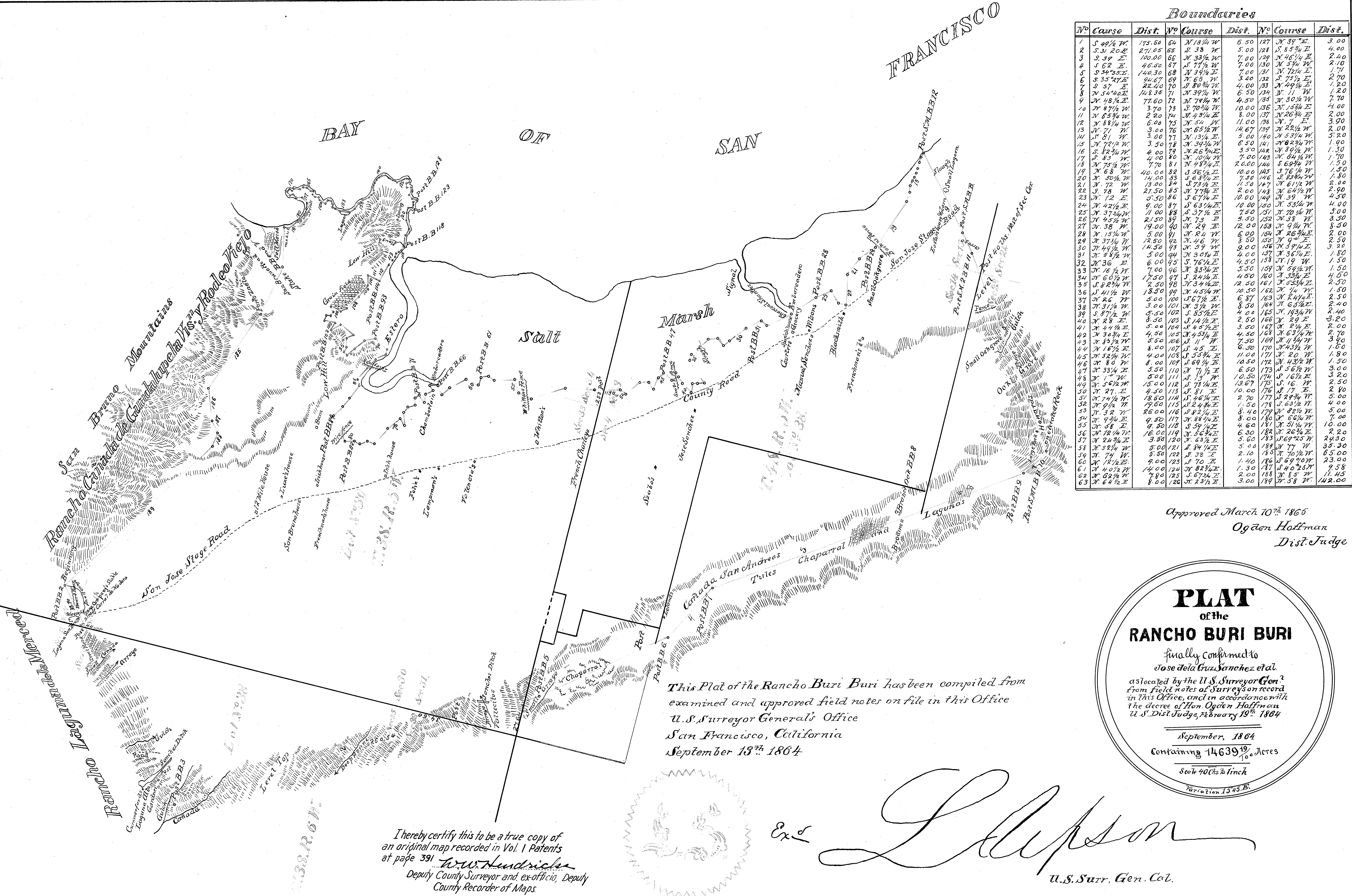
Plat of rancho in 1864

Rancho Buri Buri was first established as grazing land for Mission Dolores and the Presidio of San Francisco. In 1827, Sub lieutenant José Antonio Sánchez, who was stationed at the Presidio, was granted permission by Mexican governor José María de Echeandía to occupy the rancho for “grazing and agricultural purposes”. The land grant was confirmed in 1835, by Governor Castro. Sánchez worked the land from the time it was granted to him until his death in 1843. Upon his death, the rancho lands were divided among his 10 children.

With the cession of California to the United States following the Mexican-American War, the 1848 Treaty of Guadalupe Hidalgo provided that the land grants would be honored. As required by the Land Act of 1851, claims for Rancho Buri Buri was filed with the Public Land Commission in 1852, and the grant was patented to José de la Cruz Sánchez and siblings in 1872.

The heirs to Rancho Buri Buri were forced to sell their land to pay for property taxes, legal fees, and loans. The new owners of Rancho Buri Buri included Darius Ogden Mills, Ansel I. Easton and Charles Lux. Mills bought José de la Cruz Sánchez's one-tenth of his father's estate (1,500 acres (6 km^{2})), which is now Millbrae. Later, Mills and his brother-in-law, Ansel Ives Easton, acquired almost all of the land between Millbrae and San Bruno, west from El Camino Real, including the land on which San Francisco International Airport (originally Mills Field) presently stands. Charles Lux and a business partner, Alfred Edmondson purchased 1,700 acres (7 km^{2}) of Rancho Buri Buri in 1853. Lux bought out Edmonson’s interest in 1856, and founded the town of Baden (northwest of modern-day South San Francisco). In 1855 Charles Lux bought 1,464 acres (6 km^{2}) of Rancho Buri Buri land and became a partner of fellow San Francisco butcher and entrepreneur Henry Miller, forming the firm of Miller & Lux. It was on this property that Charles Lux built his family country home. Through his heirs, the Lux Ranch was sold to Peter E. Iler of Omaha, Nebraska, and became the site of the industrial city of South San Francisco. Sanchez Street, in San Francisco, remains as a legacy to Jose Antonio Sanchez's influence in the city's early development.
