= Colma Creek =

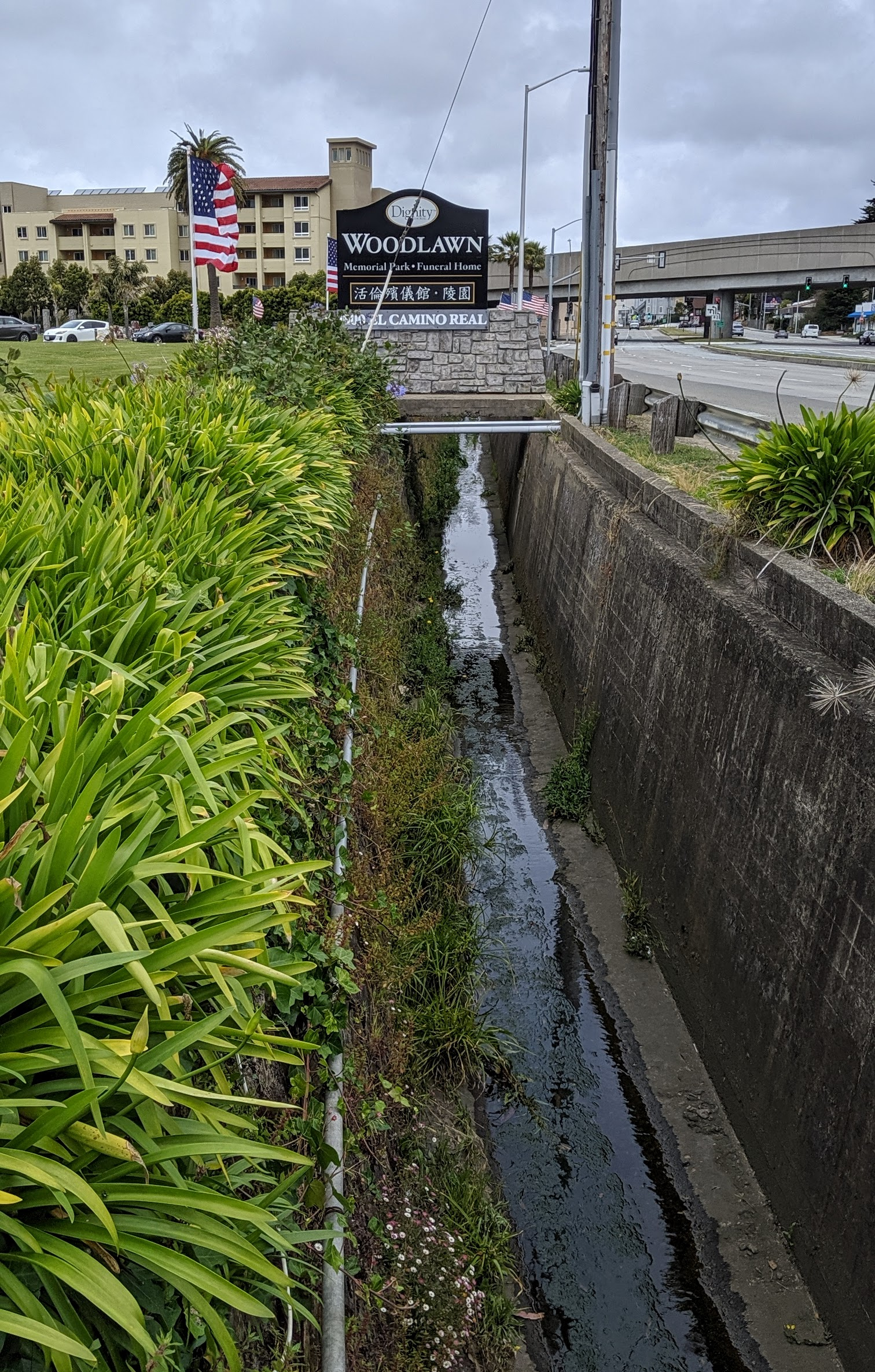

Location
- Country: United States
- State: California
- City: South San Francisco

Physical characteristics
- Source: Northern San Bruno Mountain
  - location: San Mateo County
  - coordinates: 37°40′27″N 122°27′29″W
- Mouth: San Francisco Bay (Pacific Ocean)
  - location: San Mateo County
  - coordinates: 37°38′40″N 122°23′33″W
  - elevation: 0 ft (0 m)
- Discharge
  - location: South San Francisco–San Francisco International Airport

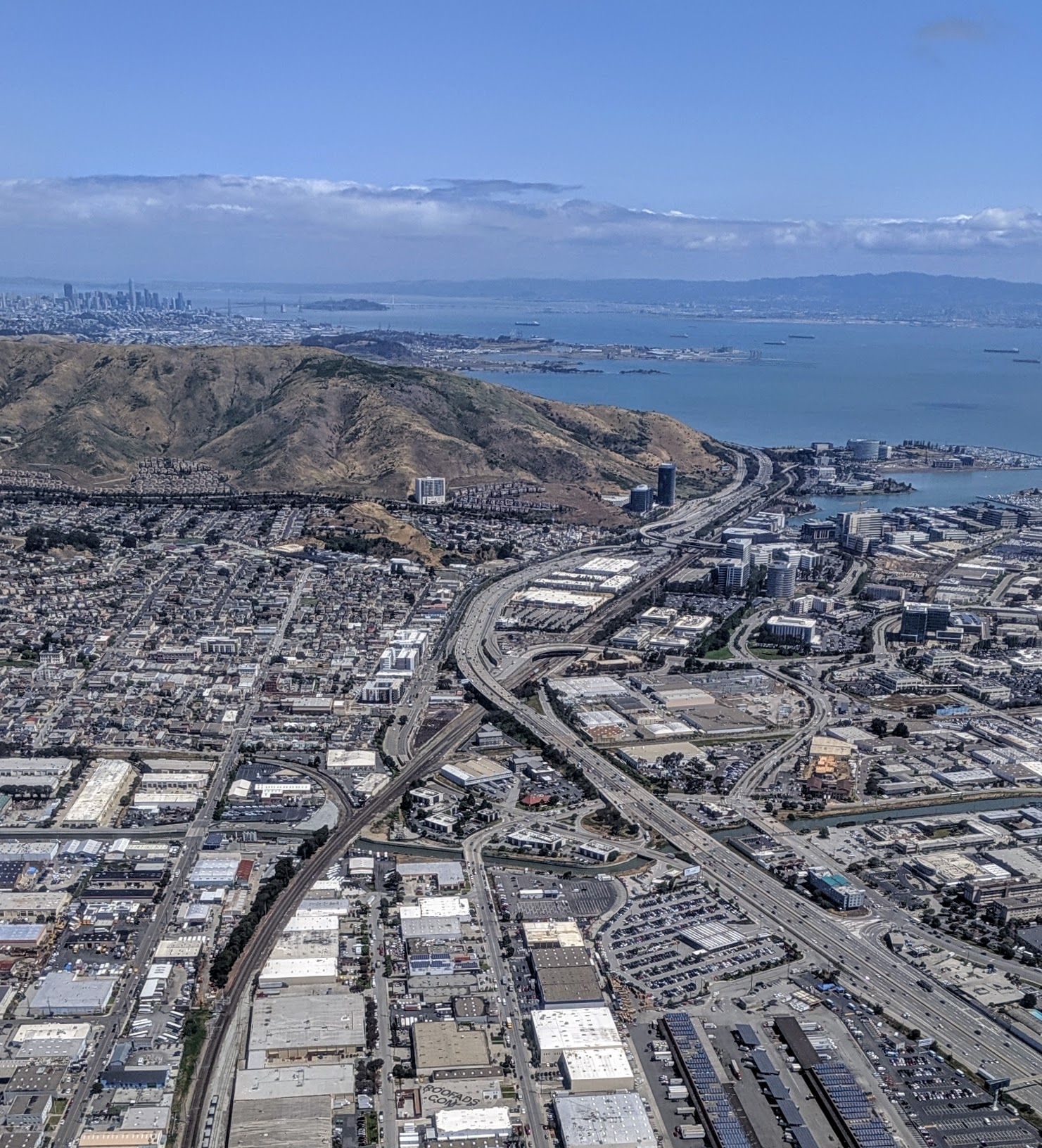
In this aerial view of South San Francisco, Colma Creek is seen crossing west–east beneath the Caltrain tracks and U.S. Route 101.

Colma Creek is a small creek that flows to the San Francisco Bay from its source in the Crocker Hills portion of San Bruno Mountain State and County Park, north of San Mateo County's Guadalupe Canyon Parkway, with contribution from April Brook on San Bruno Mountain proper, south of the Parkway. It flows southwest and makes a 90-degree bend in Daly City to flow southeastward, through Daly City, Colma, and South San Francisco to the bay. Its small delta is between South San Francisco and the San Francisco International Airport.

The creek has a tributary stream named Twelvemile Creek, which joins it from the southwest along Westborough Blvd. in South San Francisco.

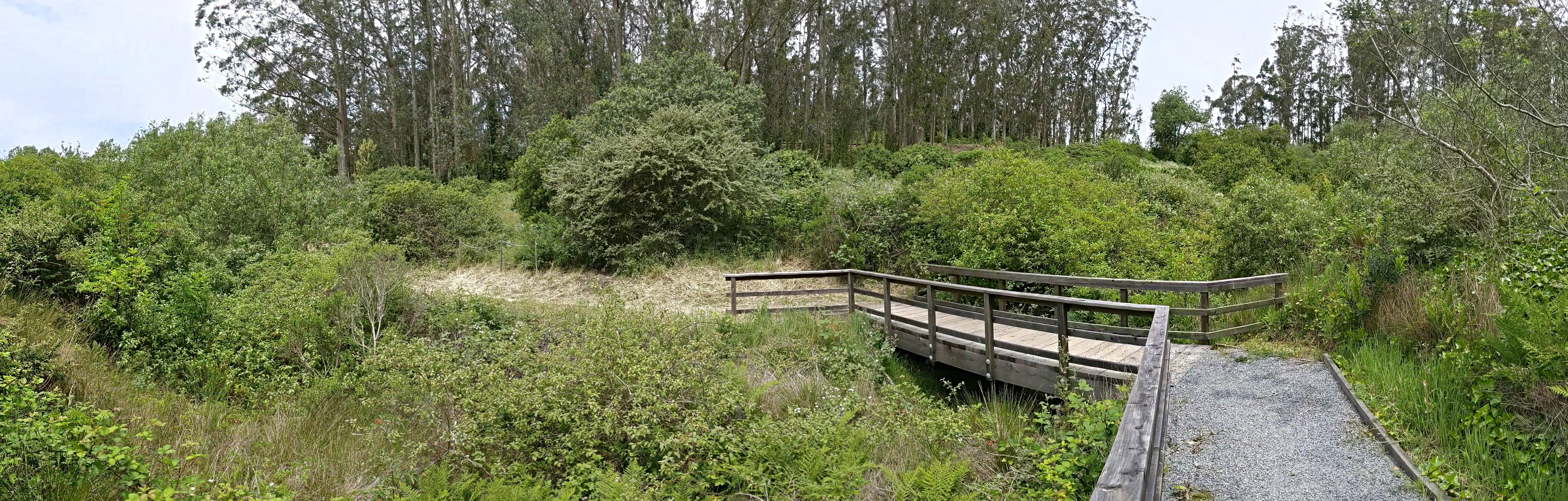
The upper bridge across Colma Creek on the Bog Trail, San Bruno Mountain State and County Park, looking into the headwaters in the eucalyptus grove above

== History ==
The large delta the creek once supported was an important stop for migratory waterfowl and other wildlife. However, like many urban creeks, Colma Creek has been surrounded by flood control walls, buried in some parts, and had much of its large delta filled in by developers. Most of the lower parts of the creek are devoid of native vegetation due to the flood control project, reducing the habitat of the endangered California clapper rail and other species that use the creek.

The headwaters of the creek are lined with non-native trees like eucalyptus, cypress, and Himalayan blackberry, displacing the native riparian plants like dogwood and willow. The creek sometimes runs dry due to the non-native vegetation lowering the water table at the source. In 2005, Shelterbelt Builders developed a habitat restoration plan to return the creek to its former state by removing invasive and non-native plants and replanting native, riparian plants at the source. In addition, in South San Francisco, new wetland was created to mitigate wetland lost to floodwall construction and improvements. The California clapper rail is expected to reinhabit the new salt and freshwater wetland, along with other species displaced by the flood control works.

The United States Geological Survey operated a stream gauge on Colma Creek from 1963 to 1996 (gage 11162720). It recorded a peak gage height of 7.53 feet and a peak flow of 3,560 cfs on Dec. 8, 1987.

== Watercourse gallery ==
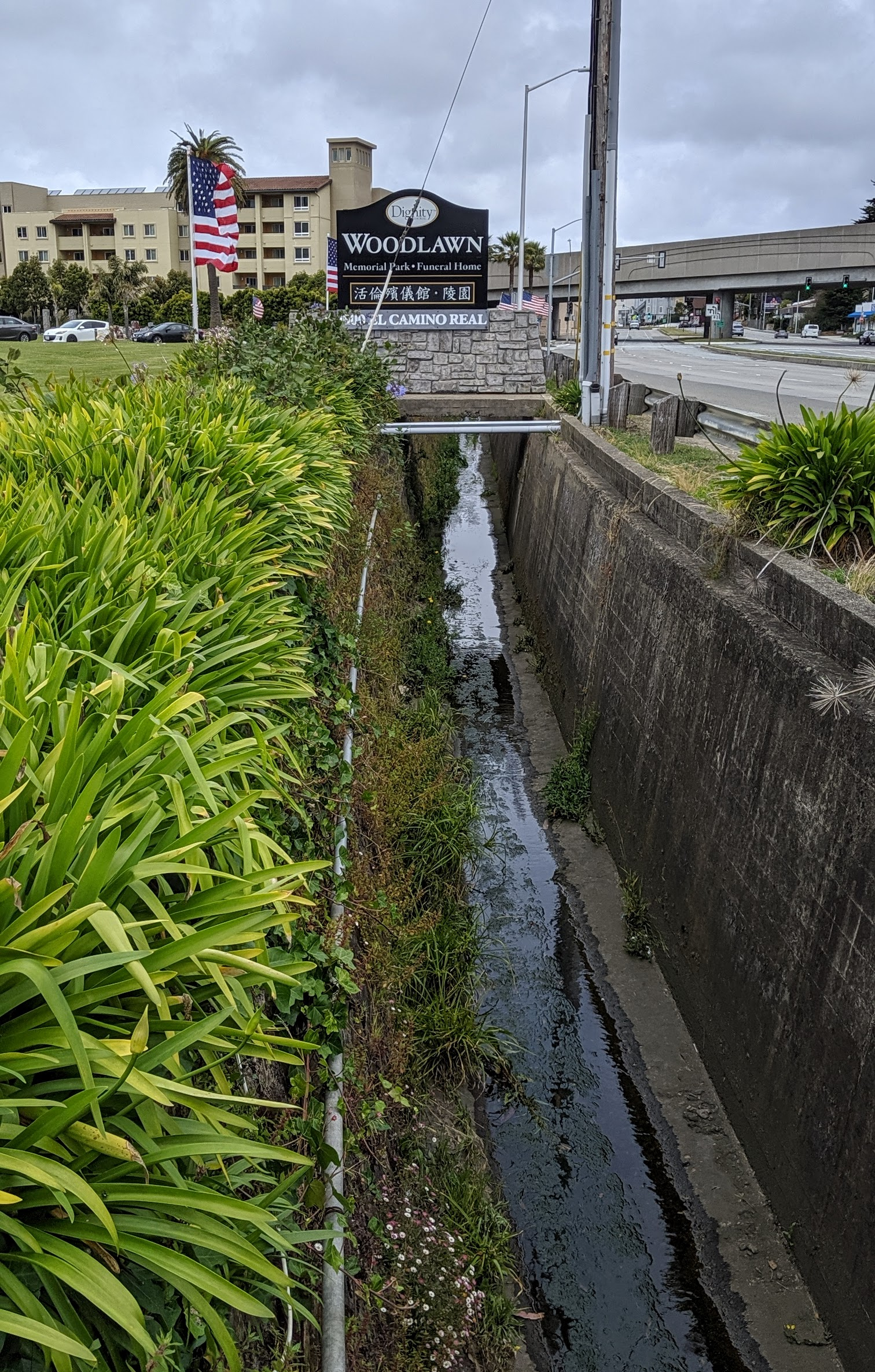
On the west side of El Camino Real in front of Woodlawn Memorial Park, Colma, looking northwest

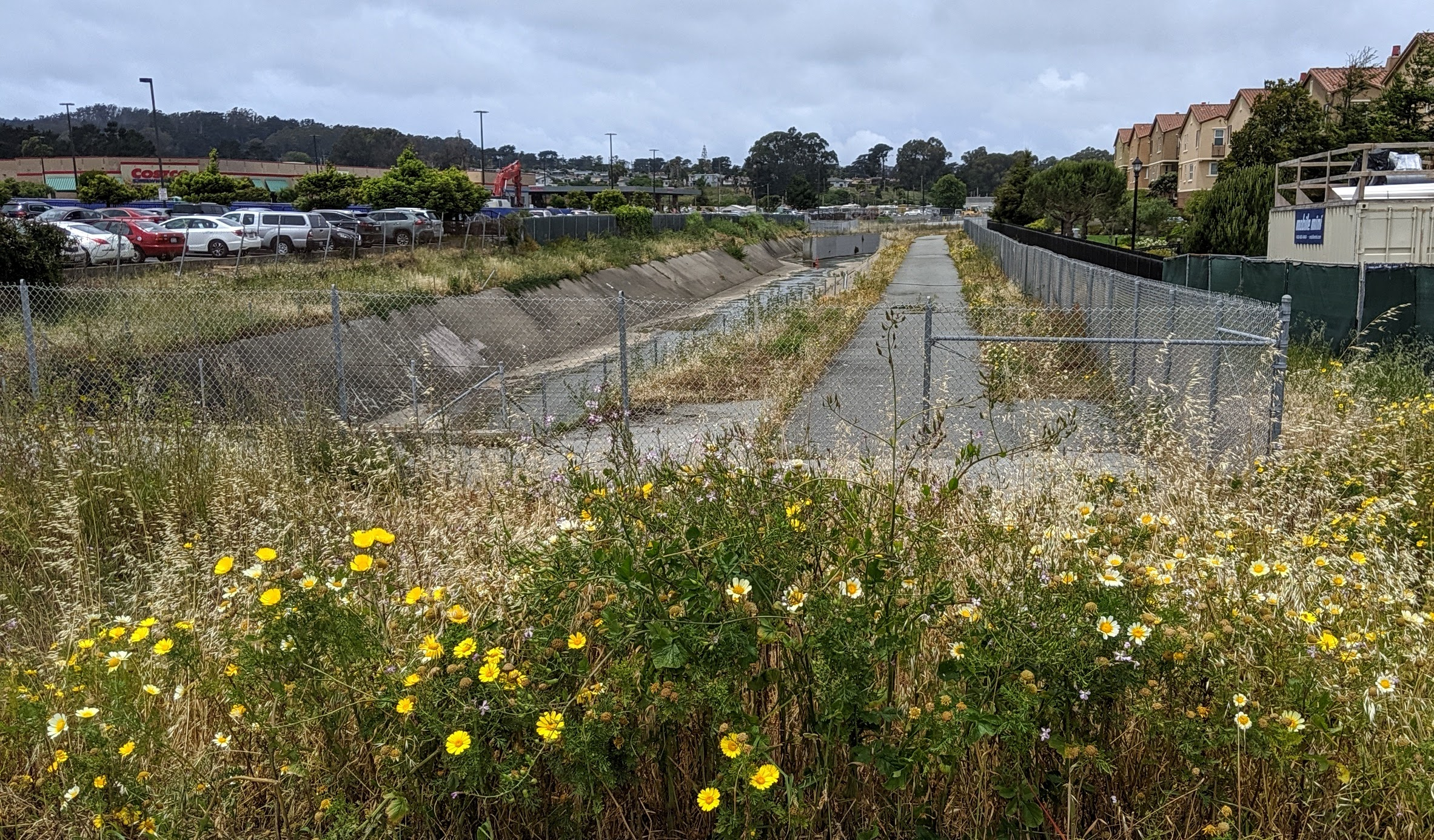
By the South San Francisco BART station, looking northwest along the border with Colma

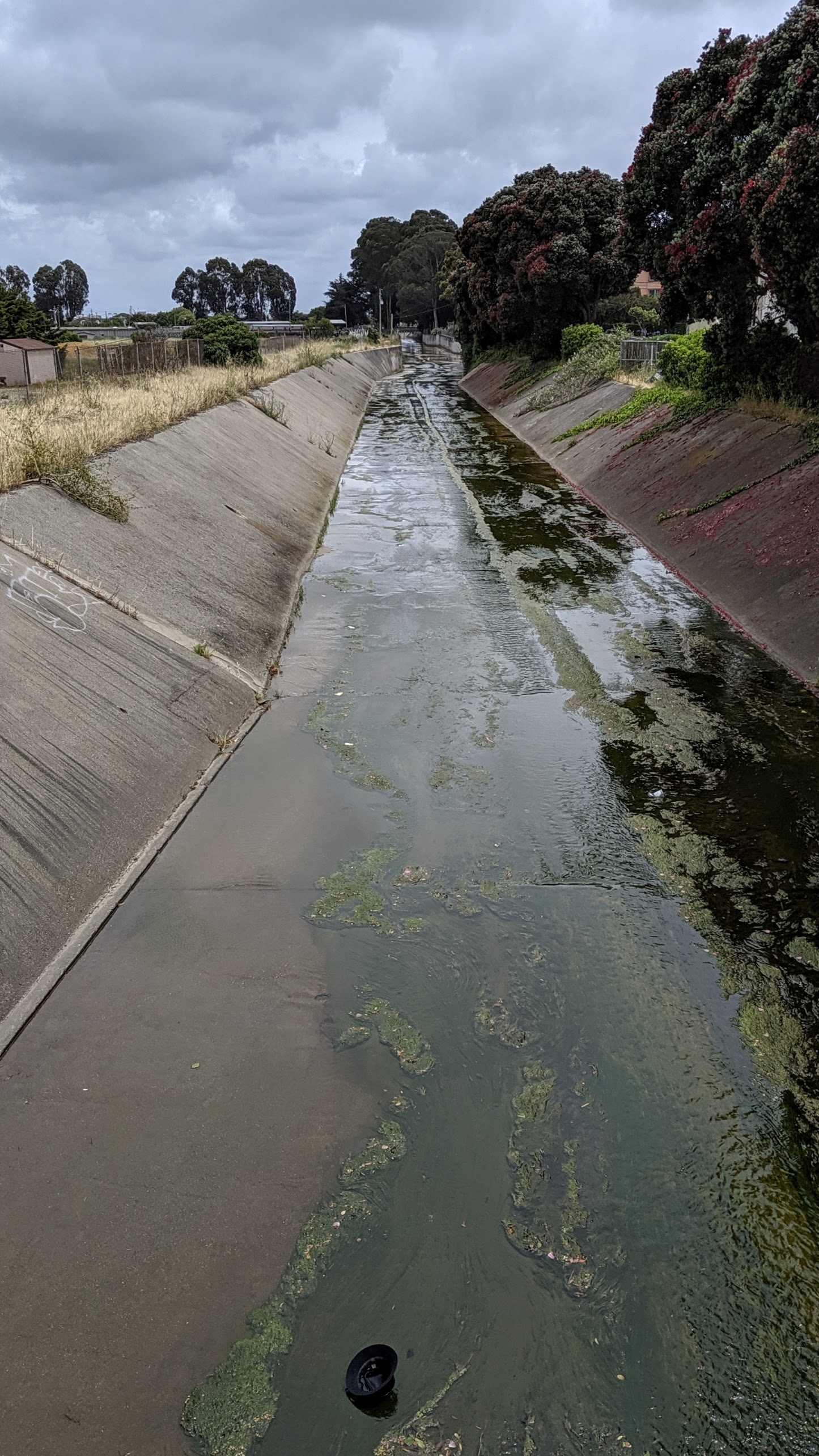
At Chestnut Ave, looking southeast, just above where Twelve Mile Creek joins from the right

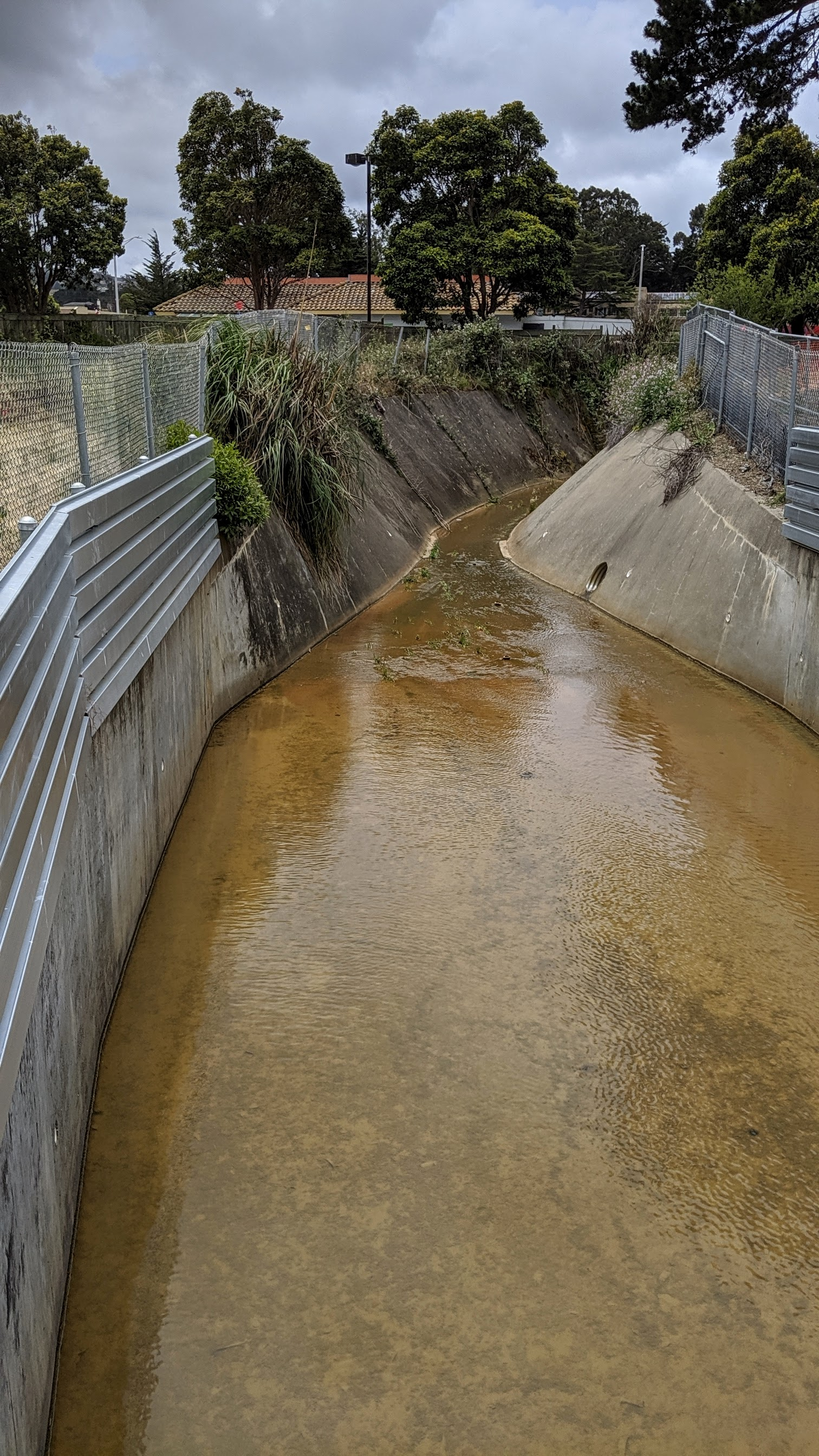
Twelve Mile Creek at Antoinette Lane, South San Francisco, looking southwest, upstream

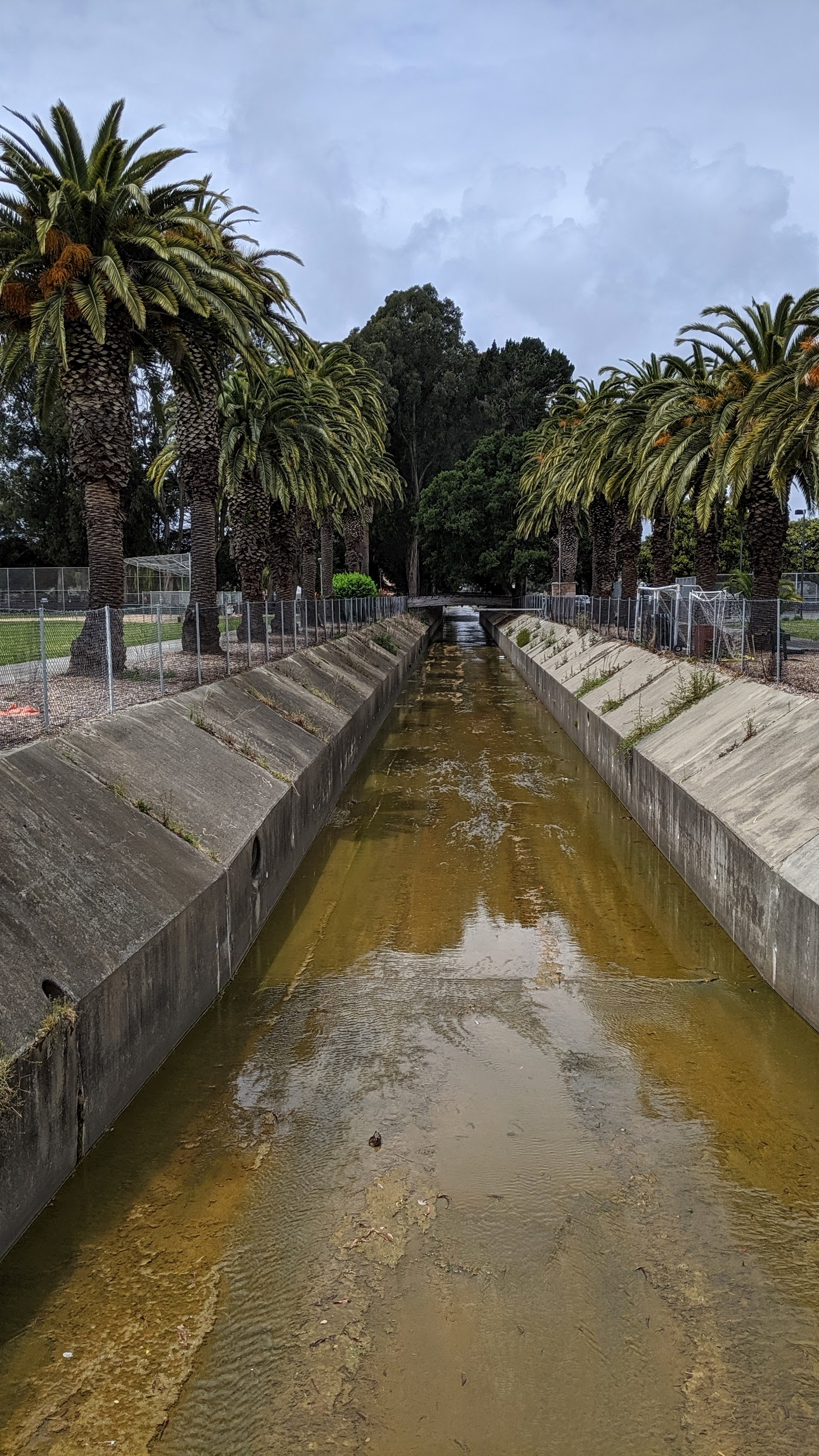
At Orange Memorial Park, South San Francisco, looking northwest into the park

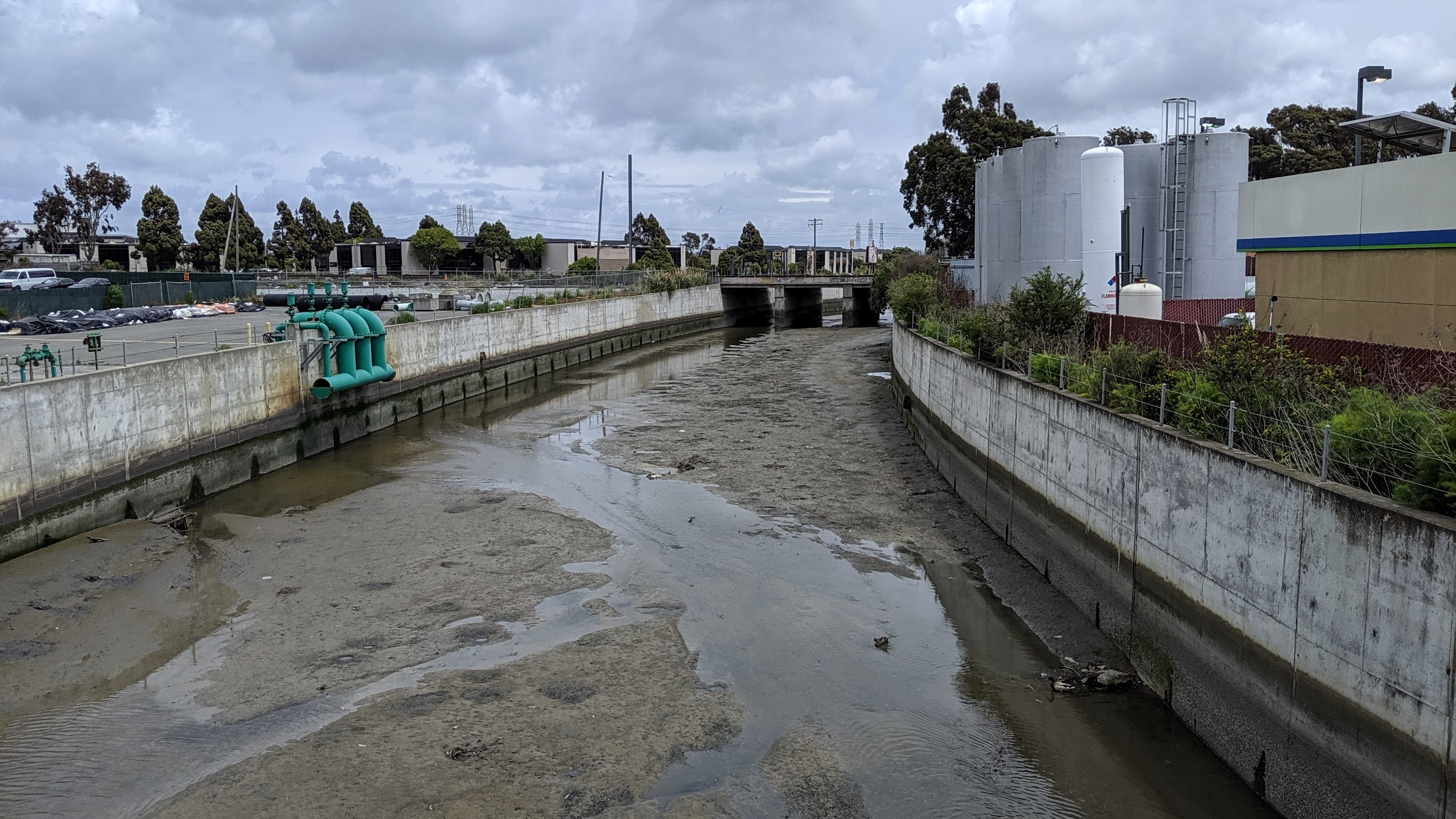
At S. Linden Ave, South San Francisco, as the creek approaches the railroad tracks and US 101 on its way to the bay

== See also ==
- List of watercourses in the San Francisco Bay Area
