= Ken Bastida =

American news anchor

- Born: Kenneth J. Bastida; December 30, 1956 (age 69); San Francisco, California, US
- Known for: News anchor, Channel 5 (KPIX)

Ken Bastida (born December 30, 1956) is a former broadcast journalist who most recently anchored at KPIX-TV, the CBS affiliate in San Francisco.

Bastida holds a bachelor's degree in Broadcast Communication Arts from San Francisco State University and was inducted into the university's Hall of Fame in May 2008. Bastida began his career as a Bay Area radio host in 1978. Since then, he held on-air positions at numerous Bay Area radio stations, including KFRC, KGO, KMEL, K101, KFYI and KCBS. For a time, Bastida hosted Landscape Smart, a landscaping show on HGTV.

He joined KPIX as a reporter in 1990 and retired from television news after his final broadcast at the station on October 29, 2021.

== Awards ==
=== Public and industry awards ===
- 1989 Peabody Award for coverage of the Loma Prieta earthquake
- 2004 Emmy Award for outstanding achievement in continuing coverage for his series "Inside the Middle East"
- 2007 Emmy Award for Best Newscast Large Market
