= El Camino High School (South San Francisco, California) =

Location
- 1320 Old Mission Road; South San Francisco, CA 94080; United States; 37.667007°N 122.44091°W

Information
- Type: Public secondary
- Established: 1961
- School district: South San Francisco Unified School District
- Principal: James Briano
- Teaching staff: 60.22 (FTE)
- Enrollment: 1,088 (2023–2024)
- Student to teacher ratio: 18.07
- Colors: El Camino Scarlet, Gunmetal
- Mascot: Colt
- Accreditation: Western Association of Schools and Colleges
- Yearbook: The Yearling
- Website: elcamino.ssfusd.org

El Camino High School (known locally as El Camino, Elco or ECHS) is a four-year American public high school in South San Francisco, California. It is located directly across from the South San Francisco BART Station. It is part of the South San Francisco Unified School District (SSFUSD). El Camino High School has received accreditation from KYLD 94.9 as the San Francisco Bay Area's "Most Spirited School In The Bay" in 2009 and 2011.

== Campus ==
El Camino High School is situated on a foothill of the San Bruno Mountain and consists of five different levels. The first level consists of a theater and a parking lot which, in 2012, was updated to contain a wide solar panel array, and a two-floor Science Building which opened in April 2014. The second level holds the majority of the school with the two-story Humanities Building, a courtyard with the Red Stage, cafeteria/teachers' lounge, a library, and the Counseling, Attendance and Main Offices. The third level holds a Math Building and a Performing Arts Building. The fourth level holds two gyms, pool, a Weightlifting Building and a few portables. A new track and athletic facility, which opened in 2013, is located on the fifth level.

The campus also has a memorial garden, large courtyard plaza, athletic facility (completion date 2017), and a large pool. It is notorious for its large number of stairs.

El Camino High School operates under a closed campus policy, prohibiting leaving the campus for lunch or meeting visitors and students during school hours.

== Demographics ==
White	Latino	Asian	African	Pacific Islander	Native American	Two or More Races
6.2%	37.9%	47.7%	0.6%	1.4%	0.2%	6.1%

According to U.S. News & World Report, 93% of El Camino's student body is "of color," with 17% of the student body coming from an economically disadvantaged household, determined by student eligibility for California's Reduced-price meal program.

== Curriculum ==
El Camino High School offers the recommended A-G courses based upon the University of California that illustrates the minimum level of academic preparation students ought to achieve in high school to undertake university level work.

- Performing Arts Department
  - Dance
    - El Camino High School has a full dance program, offering six classes with five levels of dance from Beginner (Dance 1), Advanced Beginner (Dance 2), Intermediate (Dance 3), Advanced Intermediate (Dance 4), and Advanced. All levels are year courses.
      - Dance 1 (Grades 9, 10, 11, 12 )
        - This dance class covers basic principles of rhythm, ethnic dance, ballet, contemporary, musical theatre, jazz, hip hop, choreography, and other street styles. It is recommended for students who have has little or no dance training and who are interested in studying dance as an art form.
      - Dance 2, 3, 4 (Grades 9, 10, 11, 12) Prerequisite: Prior dance level or audition
        - This course is an extension of skills learned in the previous dance class. Students are exposed to a variety of dance forms and have the opportunity to experience further skill development, creativity, and group choreography.
      - Advanced Performance Dance (Grades 9, 10, 11, 12) Prerequisite: Audition
        - This dance class is the elite advanced dance group that requires high technical ability and knowledge of dance terms. Movement will be given quickly and choreography is expected to be learned and performed without hesitation. Dancers will learn multiple dances at a time and are required to perform at school and community functions as well as all shows in the annual spring dance production. This group may travel to compete or take class with industry professionals in Los Angeles or New York City.
  - Music
  - Drama
  - Art
  - Culinary Arts
  - Video Art
  - Photo
  - Computer Science

El Camino High School currently offers twelve Advanced Placement (starting from Sophomore year) and six Honors courses.

Advanced Placement Courses:

  - AP World History: Modern (Grade 10)
  - AP US History (Grade 11)
  - AP American Government (Grade 12)
  - AP Macroeconomics (Grade 12)
  - AP English Language and Composition (Grade 11)
  - AP English Literature and Composition (Grade 12)
  - AP Environmental Science (Grade 11, 12)
  - AP Chemistry (Grade 11, 12)
  - AP Spanish Language and Culture (Grade 11, 12)
  - AP Computer Science A (Grade 10, 11, 12)
  - AP Calculus AB (Grade 11, 12)
  - AP Physics 1: Algebra Based (Grade 11, 12)

Honors Courses:

  - English 1 Honors (Grade 9)
  - English 2 Honors (Grade 10)
  - Geometry Honors (Grade 9, 10, 11, 12)
  - Algebra 2 Honors (Grade 9, 10, 11, 12)
  - Chemistry Honors (Grade 10, 11, 12)
  - Ethnic Studies Honors (Grade 11, 12)

== Notable alumni ==
- Ken Bastida, newscaster for Channel 5 news (Bay Area)
- Rich Bordi (class of 1977), MLB, Oakland A's pitcher
- Frances Freska Griarte (class of 1991) Radio Broadcaster for 96.5 KOIT and 102.9 KBLX, former TV host for TFC
- Walt Harris (class of 1964), former Stanford football coach
- Ghandia Johnson (class of 1987), Survivor: Thailand contestant
- Barry McGee (class of 1984), artist
- Dennis Pepa (class of 1986), bassist and cofounder of heavy metal (thrash) group Death Angel
- Kurtis Ming, Emmy Award winning anchor for CBS News Sacramento
- Roger Ruzek (class of 1978), former NFL player
- Aaron Solow (class of 2005), professional wrestler currently signed to All Elite Wrestling
- Darren Uyenoyama (class of 1997), former Ultimate Fighting Championship (UFC) flyweight, 62 kg gold medalist in 2007 Fila World Grappling Championship, previously fought mixed martial arts in the Japanese organization Dream

== See also ==
- San Mateo County high schools
