= Serramonte Center =

- Serramonte Center Sign
- Location: Daly City, California, United States
- Coordinates: 37.672136°N 122.470093°W
- Address: 3 Serramonte Center Daly City, CA 94015 United States
- Opened: September 1968
- Developer: Fred and Carl Gellert
- Owner: Regency Centers
- Num. of stores: 104
- Num. of anchor tenants: 3
- Floor area: 1,139,906 square feet (105,900.7 m^{2})
- Floors: 1 (2 in Dick's Sporting Goods, Dave and Buster's, and Macy's)
- Parking: 4,645 spaces
- Website: serramontecenter.com

Grand Court

Exterior of Jagalchi at Serramonte

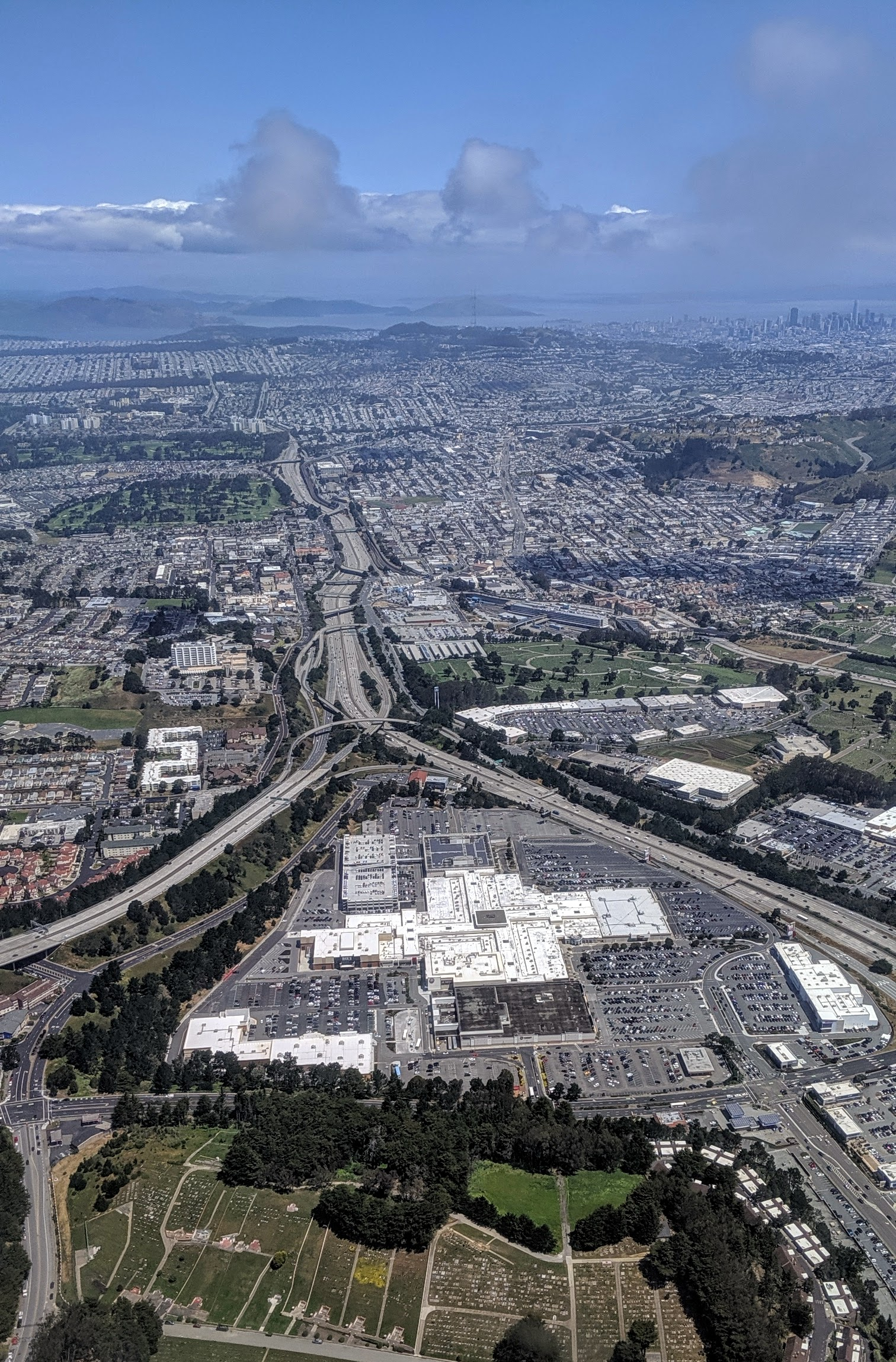
Aerial view of Serramonte Center, looking north toward San Francisco

Serramonte Center is a 1,085,402 sq ft (100,837.1 m^{2}) super-regional shopping mall located at the intersection of California State Route 1 and Interstate 280 in Daly City, California. Opened in 1968, it is owned and managed by Regency Centers and is anchored by Macy's, Dick's Sporting Goods, Target, & Jagalchi Korean Market.

== History ==
Serramonte Center was built as part of the Serramonte planned community by Fred and Carl Gellert, and opened in September 1968. Besides the anchor tenants, the 56 stores at Serramonte when it opened in 1968 included B. Dalton, Hickory Farms, Kinney Shoes, Longs Drugs, and QFI.

The mall was sold in 2002 to Capital and Counties USA and in 2011 to Equity One. As of 2021, it was owned by Regency Centers.

The center was previously renovated in 1995 and in 2004 which was inspired by feng shui principles with the addition of a koi pond in the central grand court. Another interior renovation took place between 2019-2022 which shifted towards more modern & bright interiors. The recent renovation included an expansion that began in the mid-2010s that added approximately 200,000 square feet (19,000 m^{2}) of retail space and a multistory parking structure.

== Layout and stores ==
The mall is laid out in a cross shape around the grand court, with a separate food court. Of the original anchors, Macy's, Mervyn's, and Montgomery Ward, Montgomery Ward was replaced by Target in 2002 after the chain's closure, and JCPenney replaced Mervyn's in 2011. JCPenney was closed in 2019.

The 2010s expansion of the mall has included Dick's Sporting Goods, Dave and Busters, Cost Plus World Market, Buy Buy Baby (now closed), Ross Dress for Less, T.J. Maxx, Party City (now closed), and Nordstrom Rack. Denny's and Firestone Tires, formerly located near the main mall, were closed on expiration of their leases. The mall is popular with Asians, and openings in recent years have included Asian retailers such as Uniqlo, Daiso, MINISO, Uncle Tetsu, Jolibee, 85°C Bakery Cafe, Poké House, Matcha Ren, Izumi Sushi, Marufuku Ramen, Fanloli, and Jagalchi Korean Market.

As of 2026, the latest expansion includes Australia-based Hama Film x Kono Karaoke's first United States location which opened on September 18, 2026, alongside Koi Palace's new flagship location, Bloomingdale's Outlet, The Cheesecake Factory, Marugame Udon, Fogo de Chão, Haidilao, and Undercover Fries which are all expected to open between the end of 2026 to early 2027.

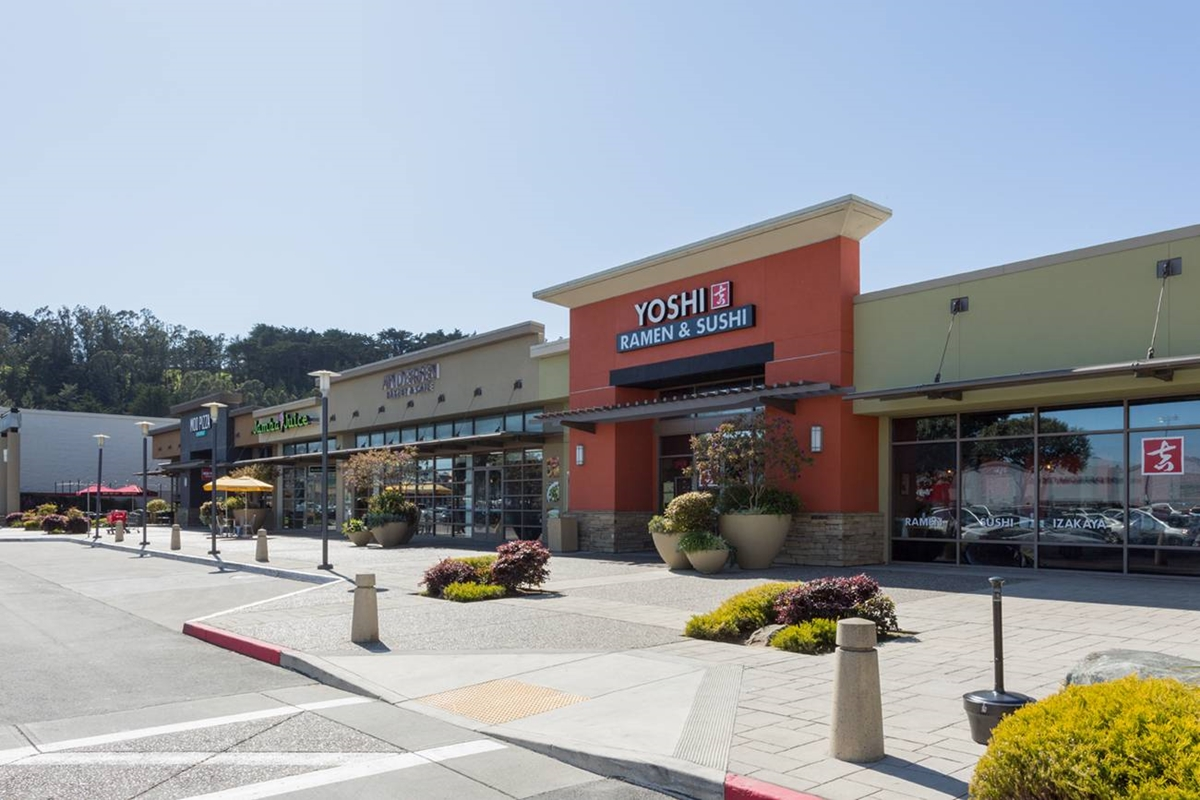
Exterior Restaurants

Macy's Wing

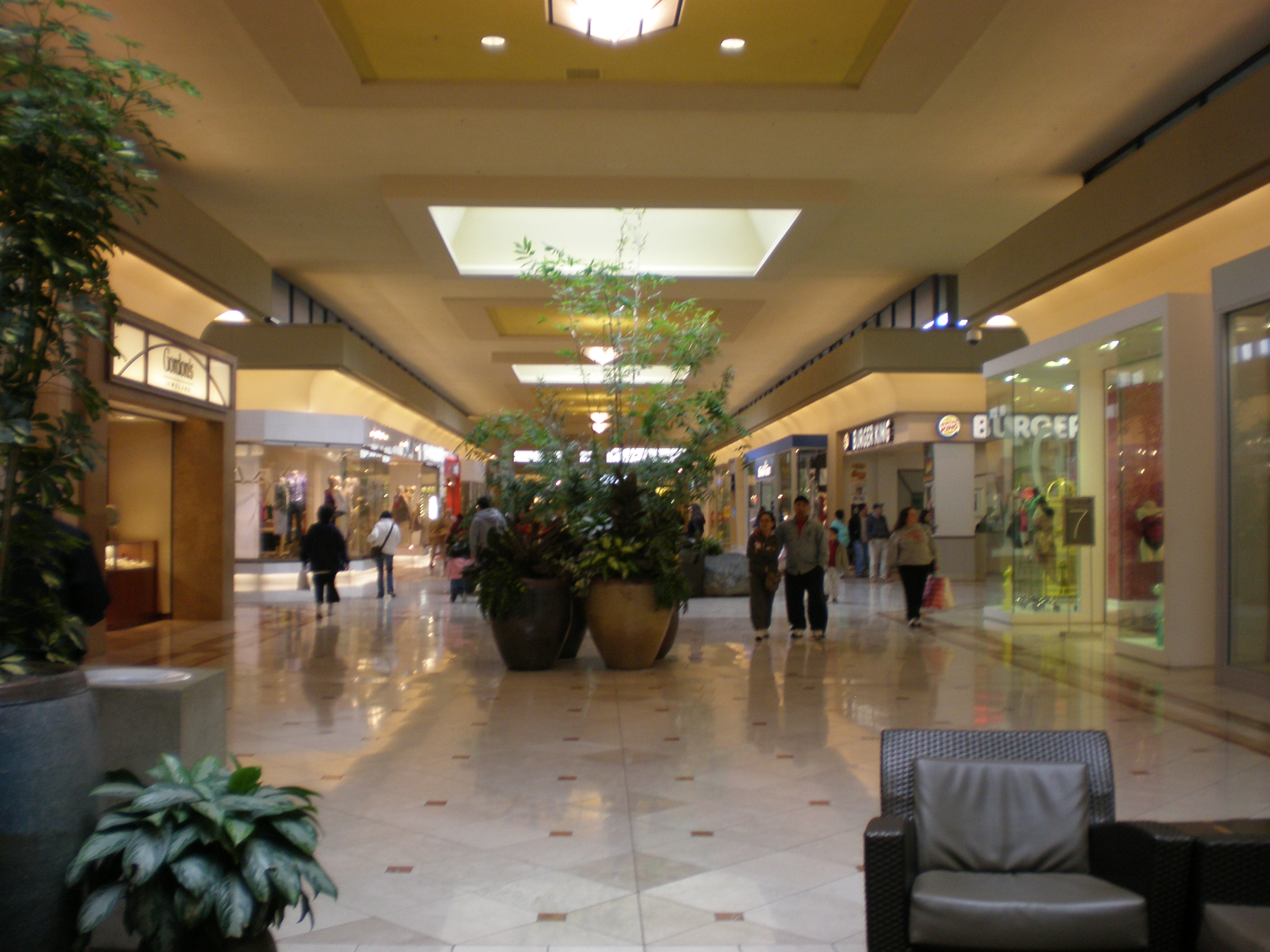
Old Interior (2010)

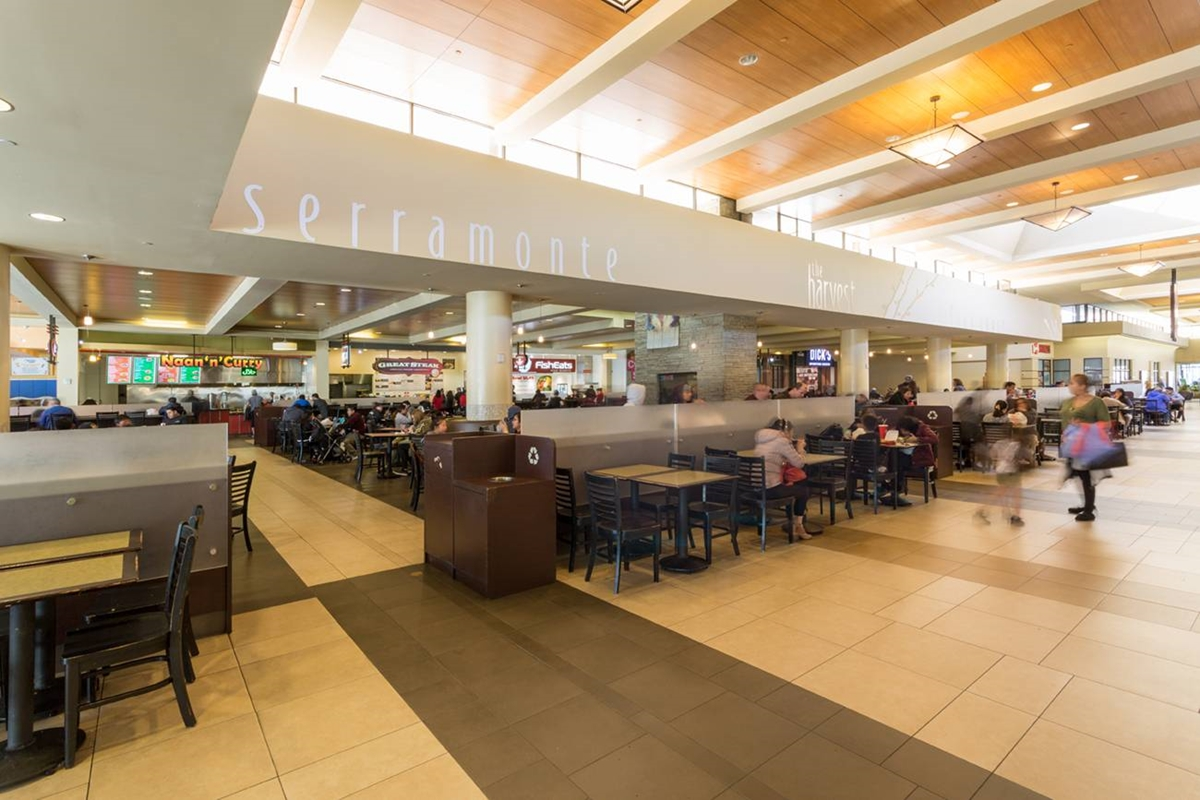
Old Food Court
