= Amreit =

AmREIT, Inc.
- Industry: Real estate investment trust
- Founded: 1985; 40 years ago
- Defunct: February 18, 2015
- Fate: Acquired by Edens

AmREIT, Inc. was a real estate investment trust that invested in shopping centers in Texas and Atlanta, Georgia. The company also managed real estate investment funds for high net worth individuals and in partnership with JPMorgan Chase and Goldman Sachs.

As of December 31, 2013, the company owned 32 properties containing 1.5 million square feet.

== History ==
The company was founded in 1985.

In 2005, the company acquired Uptown Park for $68.8 million. The company also sold 8 properties for $14.7 million.

In 2006, the company acquired Uptown Plaza in Dallas, Texas.

In 2012, the company became a public company via an initial public offering.

In 2013, the company acquired Woodlake Square Shopping Center for $41.6 million.

In July 2014, Regency Centers Corporation made a proposal to acquire the company but the offer was rejected.

In 2015, the company was acquired by Edens in a $763 million transaction.
