= Daly City, California =

City in California, United States

- City
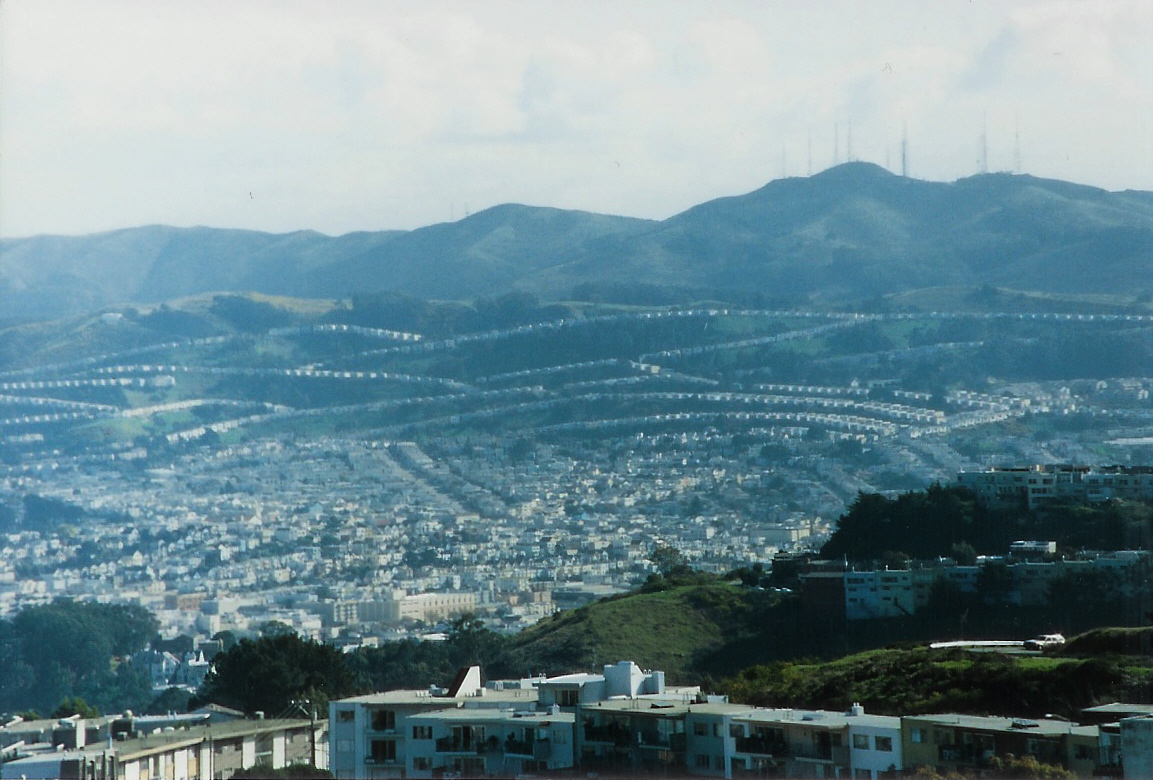
- Part of Daly City, with San Bruno Mountain and the San Francisco neighborhood of Crocker-Amazon in the background

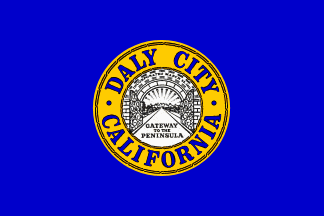
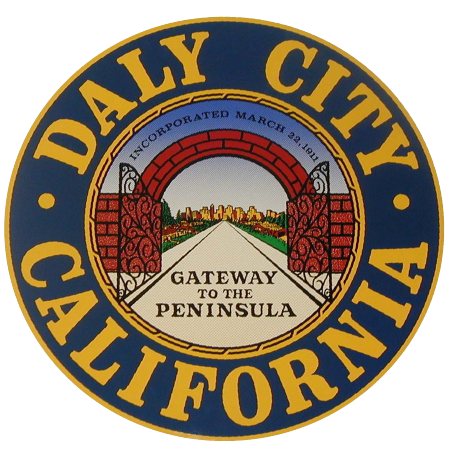
- Flag Seal
- Nickname: Gateway to the Peninsula
- Interactive map of Daly City, California
- Coordinates: 37°41′11″N 122°28′06″W
- Country: United States
- State: California
- County: San Mateo
- Incorporated: March 22, 1911
- Named for: John Daly

Government
  - Type: Council-Manager
  - Mayor: Rod Daus-Magbual
  - City council: Council Members: Glenn R. Sylvester (vice-mayor); Juslyn C. Manalo; Pamela DiGiovanni; Teresa G. Proaño
  - State Assembly: Catherine Stefani (D)
  - State Senator: Scott Wiener (D)
  - U. S. Rep.: Kevin Mullin (D)

Area
  - City: 7.64 sq mi (19.78 km^{2})
  - Land: 7.64 sq mi (19.78 km^{2})
  - Water: 0 sq mi (0.00 km^{2})
- Elevation: 335 ft (102 m)

Population (2020)
  - City: 104,901
  - Estimate (2024): 101,418
  - Rank: 335th in the United States; 75th in California; 2nd in San Mateo County
  - Density: 13,733.3/sq mi (5,302.44/km^{2})
  - Urban: 3,515,933 (US: 14th)
  - Metro: 4,579,599 (US: 13th)
- Time zone: UTC–8 (Pacific (PST))
  - Summer (DST): UTC–7 (PDT)
- ZIP codes: 94014, 94015, 94016, 94017
- Area codes: 415/628, 650
- FIPS code: 06-17918
- GNIS feature ID: 1658369 and 2410291
- Sales tax: 9.875%
- Website: dalycity.org

Daly City (/ˈdeɪli/) is the second-most populous city in San Mateo County, California, United States. Located in the San Francisco Bay Area, and immediately south of San Francisco (sharing its northern border with almost all of San Francisco's southern border), it is named for businessman and landowner John Donald Daly. Its population was 104,901 at the 2020 census. The racial makeup of Daly City was 57.3% Asian, 11.7% non-Hispanic White, and 23.1% Hispanic or Latino of any race in the 2020 census. Notably, 33.2% of Daly City is Filipino.

== History ==
Archaeological evidence suggests the San Francisco Bay area has been inhabited as early as 2700 BC. People of the Ohlone language group probably occupied northern California from at least the year A.D. 500. Though their territory had been claimed by Spain since the early 16th century, they had relatively little contact with Europeans until 1769, when as part of an effort to colonize Alta California, an exploration party led by Don Gaspar de Portolá learned of the existence of San Francisco Bay. Seven years later, in 1776, an expedition led by Juan Bautista de Anza selected the site for the Presidio of San Francisco, which José Joaquín Moraga soon established. Later the same year, Franciscan missionary Francisco Palóu founded the Mission San Francisco de Asís (Mission Dolores). As part of the founding, the priests claimed the land south of the mission for 16 miles for raising crops and for fodder for cattle and sheep. In 1778, the priests and soldiers marked out a trail to connect San Francisco to the rest of California. At the top of Mission Hill, the priests named the gap between San Bruno Mountain and the hills on the coast La Portezuela ("the Little Door"). La Portezuela was later referred to as Daly's Hill, the Center of Daly City, and is now called Top of the Hill.

During Spanish rule, the area between San Bruno Mountain and the Pacific remained uninhabited. Upon independence from Spain, prominent Mexican citizens were granted land parcels to establish large ranches, three of which covered areas now in Daly City and Colma. Rancho Buri Buri was granted to Jose Sanchez in 1835 and covered 14,639 acres (59.24 km^{2}), including parts of modern-day Colma, Burlingame, San Bruno, South San Francisco, and Millbrae. Rancho Laguna de la Merced was 2,219 acres (8.98 km^{2}) acres and covered the area around a lake of the same name. The third ranch covering parts of the Daly City–Colma area was named Rancho Cañada de Guadalupe la Visitación y Rodeo Viejo and stretched from the Visitacion Valley area in San Francisco, to the city of South San Francisco covering 5,473 acres (22.15 km^{2}).

Following the Mexican Cession of California at the end of the Mexican–American War, the owners of Rancho Laguna de la Merced tried to claim land between San Bruno Mountain and Lake Merced. An 1853 US government survey declared that the contested area was, in fact, government property and could be acquired by private citizens. A brief land rush occurred as settlers, mainly Irish, established ranches and farms in parts of what is now the neighborhoods of Westlake, Serramonte, and the cities of Colma and Pacifica. A decade later, several families left as increases in the fog density killed grain and potato crops. The few remaining families switched to dairy and cattle farming as a more profitable enterprise. In the late 19th century as San Francisco grew and San Mateo County was established, the Daly City area also gradually grew, including homes and schools along the lines for the Southern Pacific railroad. The Daly City area served as a location where San Franciscans would cross over county lines to gamble and fight. As tensions built in approach to the American Civil War, California was divided between pro-slavery, and Free Soil advocates. Two of the main figures in the debate were US Senator David C. Broderick, a Free Soil advocate, and David S. Terry, who was in favor of extension of slavery into California. Quarreling and political fighting between the two eventually led to a duel in the Lake Merced area, at which Terry mortally wounded Broderick, who died three days later. The site of the duel is marked with two granite shafts where the men stood, and is designated as California Historical Landmark number 19.

=== 20th century ===
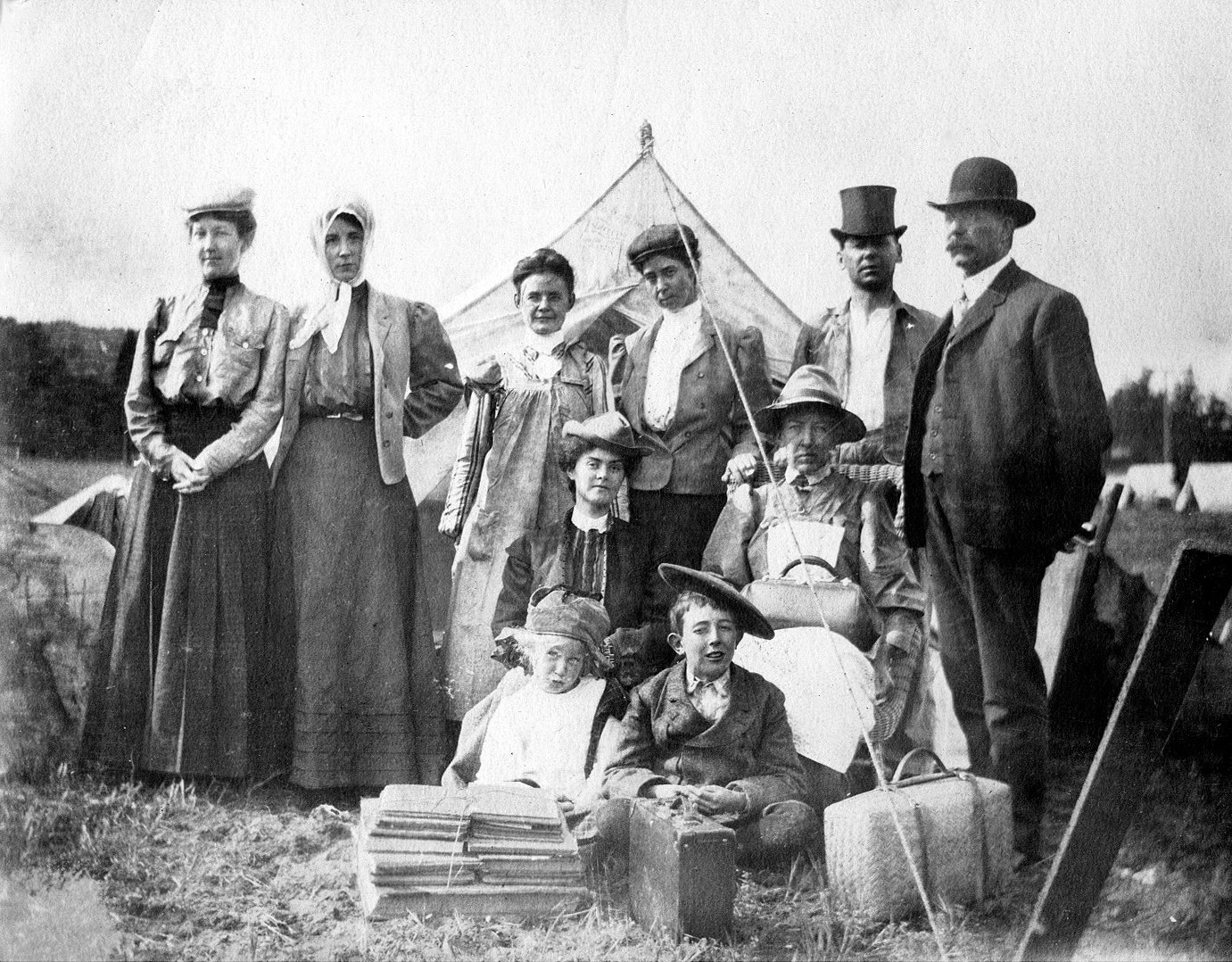
Displaced victims of the 1906 San Francisco earthquake, in front of a temporary tent shelter

On the morning of April 18, 1906, a major earthquake struck just off the coast of the Daly City area near Mussel Rock. After the quake and subsequent fire destroyed many San Franciscans' homes, they left for temporary housing on the ranches of the area to the south, including the large one owned by John Daly. Daly had come to the Bay Area in 1853, where he had worked on a dairy farm, and after several years, married his bosses' daughter and acquired 250 acres (1.0 km^{2}) at the Top of the Hill area. Over the years, Daly's business grew, as did his political clout. When a flood of refugees from the quake came, Daly and other local farmers donated milk and other food items. Daly later subdivided his property, from which several housing tracts emerged.

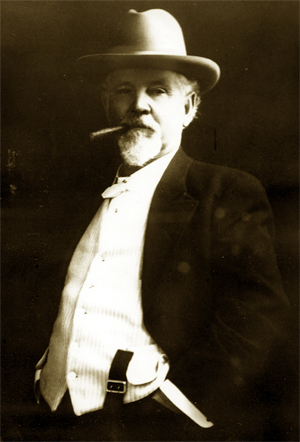
John Donald Daly, founder and namesake of Daly City

As some of the refugees established homes in the area, the need for city services grew. This, combined with the fear of annexation by San Francisco and being ignored by San Mateo County, whose seat far to the south left residents feeling ignored, created a demand for incorporation. The first such attempt was proposed in 1908 for incorporation as the city of Vista Grande. Vista Grande would have spanned from the Pacific to the Bay, with San Francisco as its northern border and South San Francisco and the old Rancho Buri Buri as its southern border. The proposal was rejected over the scope of the planned city, which was too broad for many residents. The initial proposal also revealed rifts in the community among the various regions, including the area around the cemeteries, which were excluded from further plans of incorporation. On January 16, 1911, an incorporation committee filed a petition with San Mateo County supervisors to incorporate the City of Daly City, which would run from San Francisco along the San Bruno Hills until Price and School Streets with San Francisco and west to the summit of the San Bruno Hills. The city would have an estimated population of 2,900. On March 18, 1911, a special election was held, with incorporation narrowly succeeding by a vote of 132 to 130.

It remained a relatively small community until the late 1940s, when developer Henry Doelger established Westlake, a major district of homes and businesses, including the Westlake Shopping Center. Beginning in the 1950s, Filipino Americans began to purchase homes east of Junipero Serra Boulevard, as they were barred from the Westlake development due to racial covenants. On March 22, 1957, Daly City was again the epicenter of an earthquake, this one a 5.3-magnitude quake on the San Andreas Fault, which caused some structural damage in Westlake and closed State Route 1 along the Westlake Palisades. In 1963, Daly City annexed the city of Bayshore. The Cow Palace, located in Bayshore and now within the city limits of Daly City, was the site of the following year's Republican National Convention; it had also hosted the 1956 RNC. The Daly City BART station opened on November 5, 1973, providing northern San Mateo County with rail service to downtown San Francisco and other parts of the Bay Area. The line was extended south to Colma in 1996 and then to Millbrae and the San Francisco International Airport in 2003.

In October 1984, Taiwanese American writer Henry Liu was assassinated in his garage in Daly City, allegedly by Kuomintang agents.

The Daly City History Museum, opened in March 2009, is located in the building that housed the John Daly Library, Daly City's first library. The museum houses exhibits related to Daly City's history, and maintains an archive of photos and documents.

== Geography ==
According to the United States Census Bureau, the city has a total area of 7.7 square miles (20 km^{2}), all land.

Daly City is bordered by the cities of San Francisco, Brisbane, Pacifica, South San Francisco, and the town of Colma. The city borders several unincorporated areas of San Mateo County. It surrounds Broadmoor, and borders San Bruno Mountain State Park, the Olympic Club, Lake Merced, and unincorporated areas near Colma. Seismic faults in and near Daly City include the San Andreas Fault, Hillside Fault, and Serra Fault.

=== Neighborhoods ===
Neighborhoods of Daly City include Westlake, St. Francis Heights, Serramonte, Top of the Hill, Hillside, Crocker, Southern Hills, and Bayshore. Westlake is notable for its distinct architecture and for being among the earliest examples of a planned, large-tract suburb. It was the inspiration for Malvina Reynolds' 1962 song "Little Boxes", and later a coffee-table book and documentary Little Boxes: The Architecture of a Classic Midcentury Suburb. Bayshore, the easternmost neighborhood of Daly City, was an incorporated city, Bayshore City, from 1932 to 1940; it was annexed to Daly City in 1963. Several Daly City neighborhoods, such as Crocker, Southern Hills, and Bayshore, share a street grid and similar characteristics with adjacent San Francisco neighborhoods, such as Crocker-Amazon and Visitacion Valley.

Several neighborhoods associated with Daly City lie outside of its city limits. Broadmoor is an unincorporated area completely surrounded by Daly City. Colma is an incorporated town sandwiched between Daly City, South San Francisco, and San Bruno Mountain. These enclaves are in charge of their own police and fire services, but share some services with Daly City.

=== Climate ===
Daly City's climate is similar to that of San Francisco's western areas such as the Richmond District and Sunset District, with fog occurring in the spring and early-to-late summer. In July and August, on rare occasions, temperatures peak over 75 °F. Summers are cool and dry, whereas winters are mild and wet.

== Demographics ==
Historical population
Census	Pop.	Note	%±
1920	3,779		—
1930	7,838		107.4%
1940	9,625		22.8%
1950	15,191		57.8%
1960	44,791		194.9%
1970	66,922		49.4%
1980	78,519		17.3%
1990	92,311		17.6%
2000	103,621		12.3%
2010	101,123		−2.4%
2020	104,901		3.7%
2024 (est.)	101,418	▼	−3.3%
U.S. Decennial Census; 1860–1870 1880-1890; 1900 1910 1920; 1930 1940 1950; 1960 1970 1980; 1990 2000 2010; 2020

=== Racial and ethnic composition ===
Daly City city California – Racial and ethnic composition Note: the US Census treats Hispanic/Latino as an ethnic category. This table excludes Latinos from the racial categories and assigns them to a separate category. Hispanics/Latinos may be of any race.
Race / Ethnicity (NH = Non-Hispanic)	Pop 2000	Pop 2010	Pop 2020	% 2000	% 2010	% 2020
White alone (NH)	18,344	14,031	12,207	17.70%	13.88%	11.64%
Black or African American alone (NH)	4,482	3,284	2,360	4.33%	3.25%	2.25%
Native American or Alaska Native alone (NH)	199	115	112	0.19%	0.11%	0.11%
Asian alone (NH)	52,154	55,711	59,722	50.33%	55.09%	56.93%
Native Hawaiian or Pacific Islander alone (NH)	904	752	705	0.87%	0.74%	0.67%
Other race alone (NH)	414	471	925	0.40%	0.47%	0.88%
Mixed race or Multiracial (NH)	4,052	2,830	3,633	3.91%	2.80%	3.46%
Hispanic or Latino (any race)	23,072	23,929	25,237	22.27%	23.66%	24.06%
Total	103,621	101,123	104,901	100.00%	100.00%	100.00%

=== 2020 census ===
The 2020 United States census reported that Daly City had a population of 104,901. The population density was 13,734.1 inhabitants per square mile (5,302.8/km^{2}), making it among the most densely populated cities in the country. The racial makeup of Daly City was 57.5% Asian, 14.3% White, 2.4% African American, 0.9% Native American, 0.7% Pacific Islander, 15.2% from other races, and 9.0% from two or more races. Hispanic or Latino of any race were 24.1% of the population.

The census reported that 99.3% of the population lived in households, 0.4% lived in non-institutionalized group quarters, and 0.3% were institutionalized.

There were 31,777 households, out of which 32.1% included children under the age of 18, 48.9% were married-couple households, 6.0% were cohabiting couple households, 26.3% had a female householder with no partner present, and 18.8% had a male householder with no partner present. 17.7% of households were one person, and 7.6% were one person aged 65 or older. The average household size was 3.28. There were 23,393 families (73.6% of all households).

The age distribution was 17.2% under the age of 18, 9.1% aged 18 to 24, 30.6% aged 25 to 44, 25.9% aged 45 to 64, and 17.3% who were 65 years of age or older. The median age was 39.9 years. For every 100 females, there were 97.8 males.

There were 33,444 housing units at an average density of 4,378.6 units per square mile (1,690.6 units/km^{2}), of which 31,777 (95.0%) were occupied. Of these, 54.0% were owner-occupied, and 46.0% were occupied by renters.

In 2023, the US Census Bureau estimated that 50.9% of the population were foreign-born. Of all people aged 5 or older, 38.2% spoke only English at home, 15.2% spoke Spanish, 3.2% spoke other Indo-European languages, 42.1% spoke Asian or Pacific Islander languages, and 1.2% spoke other languages. Of those aged 25 or older, 88.5% were high school graduates and 38.0% had a bachelor's degree.

The median household income in 2023 was $119,570, and the per capita income was $48,219. About 4.2% of families and 7.3% of the population were below the poverty line.

=== 2010 census ===
As of the 2010 census, 101,123 people lived in the city. The population density was 13,195.0 inhabitants per square mile (5,094.6/km^{2}), placing it 291st in population, among the top 50 in density when smaller populations are included, and 9th in density among cities with over 100,000 people.

The racial makeup of Daly City was 56,267 (55.6%) Asian, 23,842 (23.6%) White, 3,600 (3.6%) African American, 805 (0.8%) Pacific Islander, 404 (0.4%) Native American, 11,236 (11.1%) from other races, and 4,969 (4.9%) from two or more races.

Among the total population of Daly City, 33.2% were Filipino, 15.4% Chinese, 1.8% Burmese, 1.0% Vietnamese, 0.6% Indian, 0.6% Korean, 0.6% Japanese, 0.2% Indonesian, and 0.2% were Thai. Hispanic or Latino of any race were 23,929 persons (23.7%); 9.4% of Daly City's population is of Mexican origin; 4.9% is of Salvadoran, 2.7% Nicaraguan, 1.3% Guatemalan, 0.7% Peruvian, 0.7% Puerto Rican, and 0.5% Honduran heritage.

The Census reported that 100,442 people (99.3% of the population) lived in households, 273 (0.3%) lived in noninstitutionalized group quarters, and 408 (0.4%) were institutionalized.

Of the 31,090 households, 35.5% had children under 18 living in them, 51.1% were opposite-sex married couples living together, 15.0% had a female householder with no husband present, 7.2% had a male householder with no wife present, 5.2% were unmarried opposite-sex partnerships, and 293 (0.9%) same-sex married couples or partnerships; 5,855 households (18.8%) were made up of individuals and 2,136 (6.9%) had someone living alone who was 65 or older. The average household size was 3.23. There were 22,788 families (73.3% of all households); the average family size was 3.63.

The population distribution was 19.4% under 18, 10.4% from 18 to 24, 29.3% from 25 to 44, 27.4% from 45 to 64, and 13.5% were 65 or older. The median age was 38.3 years. For every 100 females, there were 97.5 males. For every 100 females 18 and over, there were 95.3 males.

The 32,588 housing units had an average density of 4,252.2 per square mile (1,641.8/km^{2}), of which 56.5% were owner-occupied and 43.5% were occupied by renters. The homeowner vacancy rate was 1.9%; the rental vacancy rate was 4.2%. About 57.6% of the population lived in owner-occupied housing units and 41.7% lived in rental housing units.

Daly City is home to the only Karaite synagogue in the United States, Congregation B'nai Israel.

As of 2010 census figures, 40.7% of Daly City residents are of Filipino descent, the highest concentration of Filipino/Filipino Americans of any midsized city in North America. This partly explains Daly City's place in the vernacular as the "Pinoy Capital". Benito M. Vergara Jr. details this history in his ethnography Pinoy Capital: The Filipino Nation in Daly City.

== Culture ==
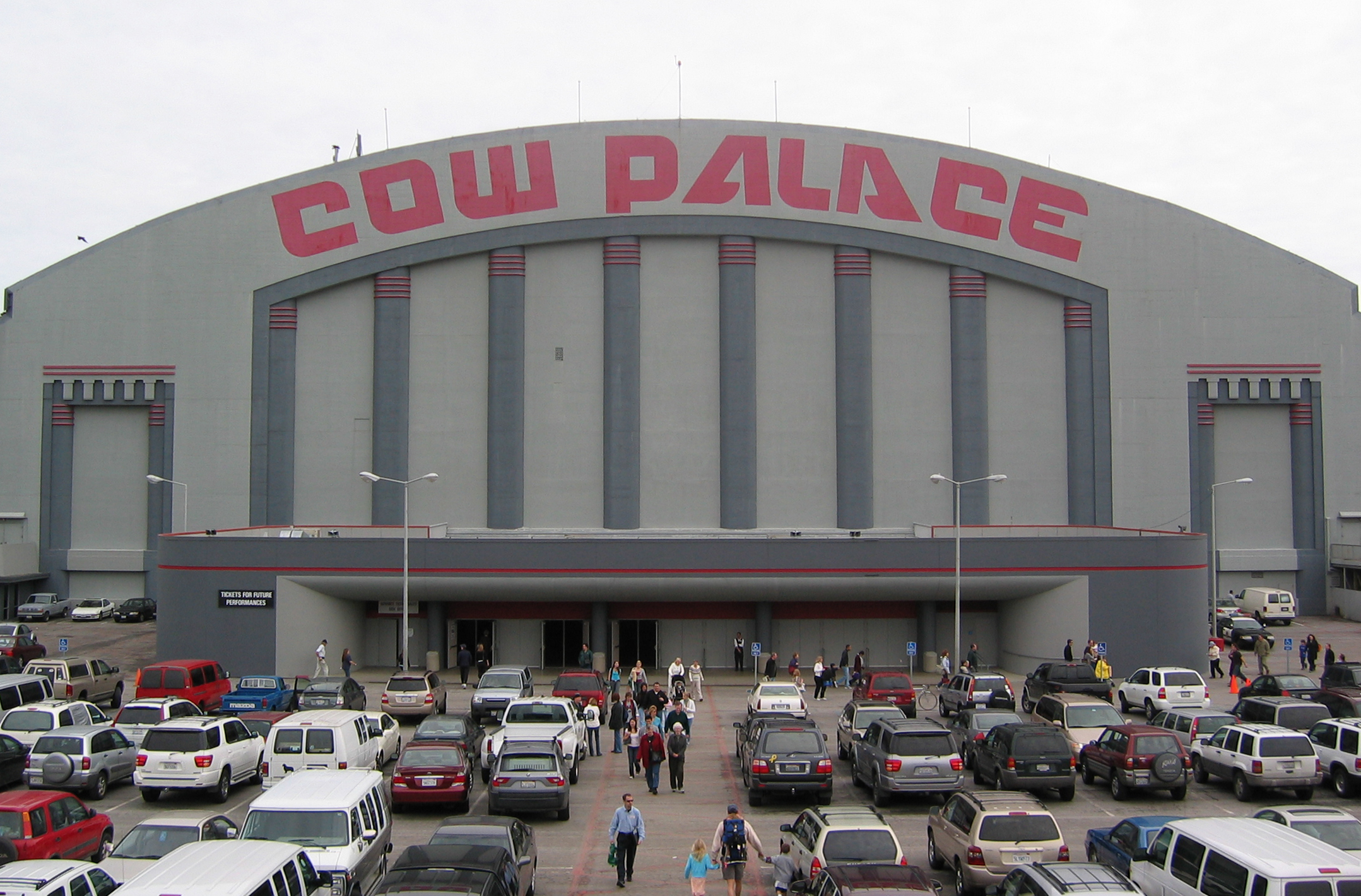
Cow Palace

The Cow Palace arena grounds straddle the border with San Francisco and is the home for the annual Grand National Rodeo, Horse, and Stock Show. It has hosted events such as concerts by the Beatles, the now-Golden State Warriors and their early appearances in the NBA Finals, the NHL San Jose Sharks hockey team, two short-lived minor-league hockey teams (the IHL San Francisco Spiders and ECHL San Francisco Bulls), and two Republican National Conventions (in 1956 and 1964).

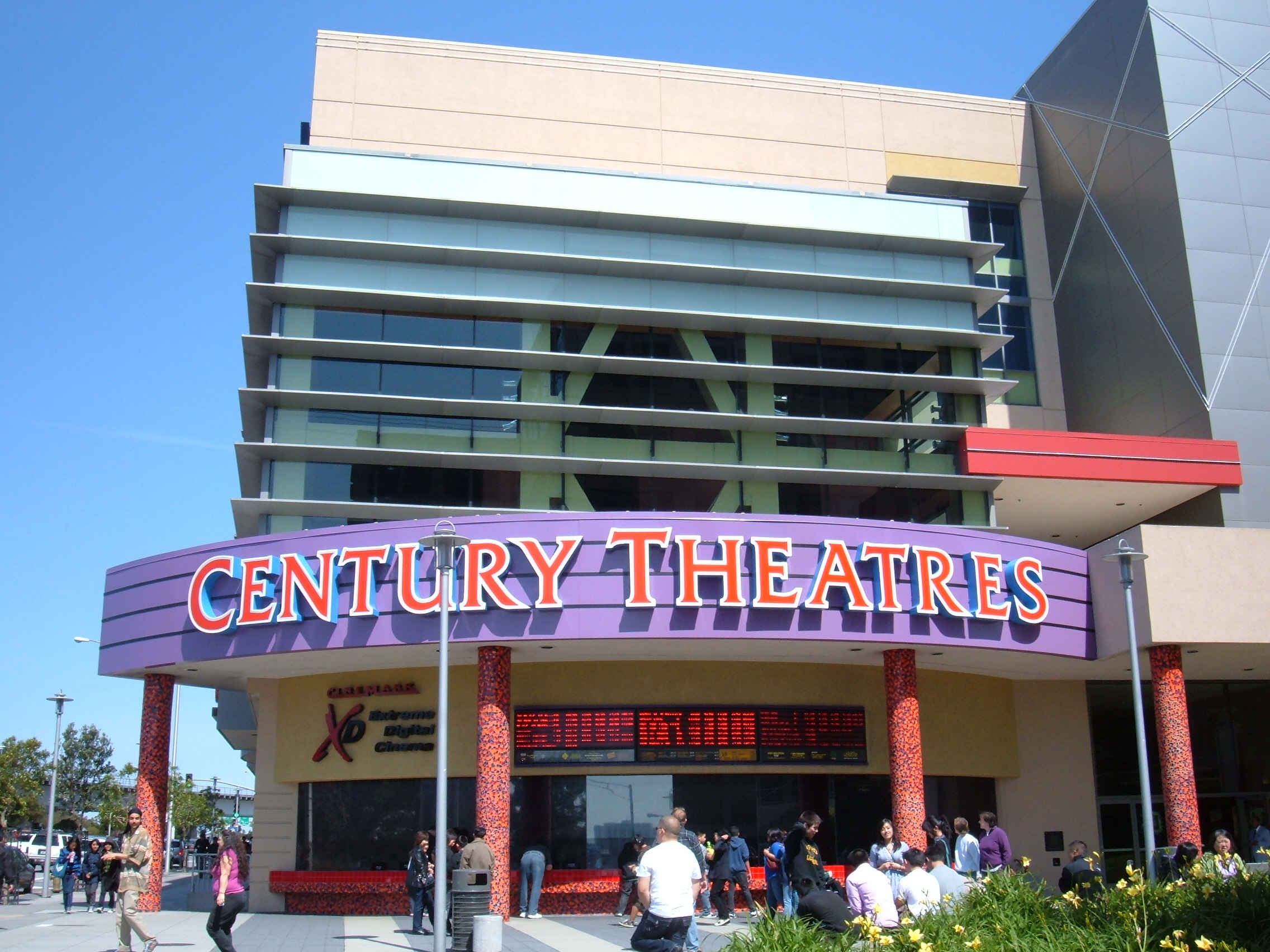
Century 20 megaplex

Century 20 Daly City is a modern megaplex movie theatre opened in 2002 as part of the Pacific Plaza business and retail development.

Several golf courses are located within or straddle the border with San Francisco. The Olympic Club has hosted the USGA U.S. Open five times, most recently in 2012, and will host both the 2028 PGA Championship and the 2032 Ryder Cup. The private San Francisco Golf Club and Lake Merced Golf Club have part or all of their courses in Daly City. The Golden Gate National Recreation Area includes the city's Thornton Beach. The topography of this area (due to the San Andreas Fault) is conducive to paragliding and hang gliding.

Daly City and neighboring Colma have emerged as shopping meccas for San Francisco residents. A combination of plentiful free parking space (compared to the constrained and expensive parking options in San Francisco) and San Mateo County's historically slightly lower state sales tax rate have contributed to this trend. Many big box retailers that are unable to operate in San Francisco due to real-estate prices, space restrictions, or political or community opposition have opened stores in the Serramonte and Westlake neighborhoods. Daly City's shopping centers are Serramonte Center and Westlake Shopping Center.

== Government ==
In the California State Legislature, Daly City is in the 11th senatorial district, represented by Democrat Scott Wiener, and in the 19th Assembly district, represented by Democrat Catherine Stefani. In the United States House of Representatives, Daly City is in California's 15th congressional district, represented by Democrat Kevin Mullin.

The city council of Daly City is a five-member body composed of Mayor Rod Daus-Magbual, Vice Mayor Glenn R. Sylvester, and Council Members Juslyn C. Manalo, Pamela DiGiovanni, and Teresa G. Proaño.

According to the California Secretary of State, as of February 10, 2019, Daly City has 46,684 registered voters. Of those, 24,175 (51.8%) are registered Democrats, 4,479 (9.6%) are registered Republicans, and 16,487 (35.3%) have declined to state a political party.

== Education ==
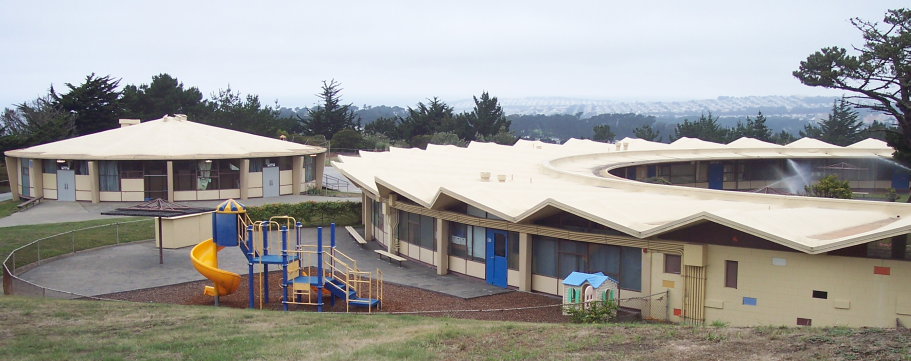
M. H. Tobias Elementary School

There are several public school districts in Daly City. The largest are the Jefferson Elementary School District and Jefferson Union High School District, both of which are headquartered in the city. In addition, there is the Bayshore Elementary School District (two schools), Brisbane School District (Panorama School in Daly City), and South San Francisco Unified School District (two schools in Daly City). Daly City has two high schools: Westmoor High School and Jefferson High School, plus a continuation school, Thornton High School and an adult school, Jefferson Adult Education. Daly City is also home to two Catholic parochial schools: Our Lady of Perpetual Help on Top-of-the-Hill and Our Lady of Mercy in Westlake. The city has four Peninsula Library System branches.

== Transportation ==
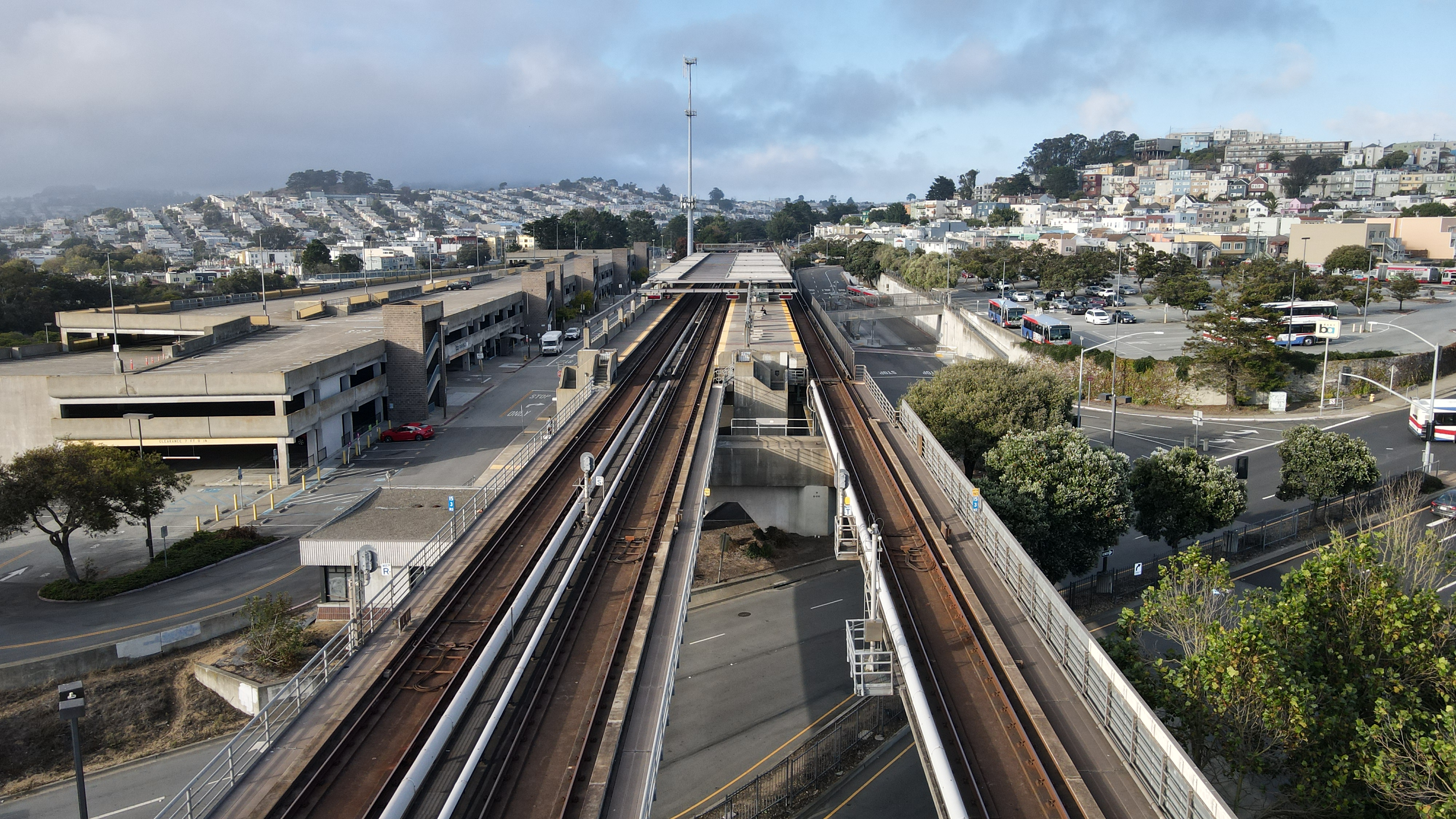
Daly City's BART station

Daly City's highway infrastructure includes State Routes 1, 35, and 82, and Interstate 280. Interstate 280, which bisects Daly City, is a primary transportation corridor linking San Francisco with San Mateo and Santa Clara Counties.

Daly City is a major hub for public transit. Bay Area Rapid Transit (BART) serves Daly City at a namesake station, as well as at Colma Station, which abuts the Daly City limits. In the 1980s, planning was conducted for the BART extension south from San Francisco, the first step being the Daly City Tailtrack Project, upon which turnaround project the San Francisco Airport Extension later built. Daly City station is the terminus of BART's Green and Blue lines, and the furthermost point in the BART network where every destination in the system can be reached without a transfer during normal hours.

In addition to BART, Daly City station serves as the northern terminus of SamTrans' ECR route and southern terminus of Muni's 14 Mission Rapid.

Since 2016, the San Francisco Municipal Transportation Agency has expressed interest in extending the Muni Metro to Daly City by extending the M Ocean View line, presently terminating at Balboa Park station.

== Sister cities ==
- Quezon City, Philippines, since October 1994
- Izumisano, Japan, since July 2024

== Notable people ==
- Craig Abaya, singer-songwriter, longtime Daly City resident; also manager of the retail store, Kit's Cameras, in Serramonte Center
- Greg Adams, trumpeter, flügelhorn player and arranger. Best known for his 25 year stint with Tower of Power; graduated from Westmoor High School in 1970.
- Mike Guingona, former mayor of Daly City
- John Madden, NFL player, Hall of Fame coach and sportscaster, graduated from Jefferson High School in 1954
- Dave Pelzer, author of several books, including the memoir A Child Called "It"
- John Robinson, national championship-winning coach at USC and for the Los Angeles Rams
- Sam Rockwell, Academy Award-winning actor, born at Seton Medical Center on November 5, 1968
- Vincent Rodriguez III, actor
- Debby Soo, CEO of Open Table

== See also ==
- List of U.S. communities with Asian-American majority populations
