= South San Francisco Unified School District =

School district in California

Location
- South San Francisco, San Bruno, and Daly City United States

District information
- Type: Public
- Grades: K-12
- Superintendent: Shawnterra Moore
- Schools: 15

Students and staff
- Students: 9,312
- Teachers: 439

Other information
- Website: ssfusd.org

South San Francisco High School

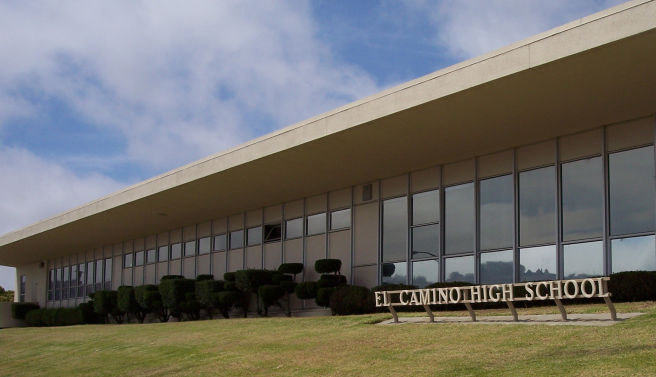
El Camino High School

The South San Francisco Unified School District is a school district in northern San Mateo County, California, serving the cities of South San Francisco, a small portion of San Bruno, and the Serramonte district of Daly City.

== Governance ==
South San Francisco Unified School District is governed by a five-member Board of Trustees. Members of the Board are directly elected by voters and serve four-year terms with staggered elections held in even years. Starting in 2020, the board has transitioned to district elections with each board member representing one of five wards. The Board is responsible for establishing educational goals and standards, approving curriculum and the school district budget, and appoints a superintendent to manage day-to-day administration. The district's current superintendent is Shawnterra Moore.

The current members of Board of Trustees include President Chailin Hsieh (Ward C), Vice President Patricia "Pat" Murray (Ward A), Board Clerk Mina Richardson (Ward E), and Trustees Amanda Anthony (Ward D) and Daina Lujan (Ward B). Anthony, Hsieh, and Richardson, were elected in 2022, while Lujan and Murray were elected in 2020. The Board rotates the position of President among the members every year.

== History ==
The first major school built in the area was the Baden Avenue School, built in 1885. In 1907, the Grand Avenue School was built to replace the former site on Baden.

Established in 1913, South San Francisco High School graduated its first class in 1917 (with 3 graduating seniors) at its new campus on Spruce Avenue. Following the flu epidemic of 1918, all schools in the area were closed and the high school was converted to a soup kitchen. In the 1920s, the city added Martin School and the Magnolia School (1925) next door to Grand Avenue School. An annex was added to the high school campus in 1926 for industrial arts and a boys' gymnasium. The building was later expanded in 1934 to hold classrooms and a girls' gymnasium.

Following the opening of the new South San Francisco High School campus on B Street in 1951, the old campus was renamed Spruce School and used for intermediate grades (4-8). A significant portion of the main building was demolished in 1959 with the remaining structure modernized in 1958 and 1966 to house Spruce Elementary School. Grand Avenue School was demolished in 1954.

Major housing construction in South San Francisco following World War II created a shortage of schools for the post-war baby boom. The 1950s saw the city's population double to 39,418, 40% of which was under the age of 18. To meet growing enrollment which had swelled to 10,124 in 1960, the District embarked upon several school building projects including the completion of the following: Parkway Intermediate (1961), El Camino High School (19 July 1961), Ponderosa Elementary (1961), Serra Vista Elementary (1961), Monte Verde School (1966), Foxridge Elementary (1966), Skyline Elementary (1967).

Around that time, two older sites – Magnolia Elementary and part of Spruce Elementary – were closed due to seismic concerns. Avalon and El Rancho were closed in the late 1970s, both of which were later sold and developed into housing. The remnants of the former can be seen in the city-owned green on Avalon Drive, while the housing community built on the site of the latter bears the name El Rancho Drive.

In the 1980s, Southwood Junior High School (the current site of Baden Continuation High School) closed and the remaining junior high schools—Parkway, Alta Loma, and Westborough—converted to a middle school format following the removal of sixth grade classes from the elementary sites. At that time, Parkway Intermediate School changed to Parkway Heights Middle School to avoid otherwise unfortunate initials.

Both Foxridge and Serra Vista were closed in 1992 after years of declining enrollment. Portions of Foxridge were leased to a private childcare facility. The 22-acre Serra Vista site with sweeping views of the San Francisco Bay and peninsula sat vacant for 15 years before being leased to the NCP College of Nursing. It also houses the District's training facility. Hillside Elementary was closed in 2005 on the Superintendent's recommendation and after heated deliberation because of a deteriorating fiscal situation, shifting demographics, and lower enrollment projections. The site is currently leased to the Mills Montessori School, a private PreK-5 elementary school.

== Schools ==
Continuation High Schools and Adult Schools

- Baden High School
- South San Francisco Adult Education

High Schools

- Community Day School, also known as CDS
- El Camino High School
- South San Francisco High School

Middle Schools

- Alta Loma Middle School
- Parkway Heights Middle School, previously known as Parkway Junior High School
- Westborough Middle School

Elementary Schools

- Buri Buri
- Junipero Serra
- Los Cerritos
- Martin
- Monte Verde
- Ponderosa
- Skyline
- Spruce
- Sunshine Gardens
