= Rancho Laguna de la Merced =

Mexican land grant in California

Coordinates: 37.720°N 122.490°W

Rancho Laguna de la Merced (also known as the Galindo ranch) was a 2,219-acre (8.98 km^{2}) Mexican land grant, in present-day southwestern San Francisco and northwestern San Mateo County, California.

It was given in 1835 by Governor José Castro to José Antonio Galindo.

The grant encompassed the area around Lake Merced in San Francisco and the present day Daly City neighborhoods of Westlake, and Serramonte.

== History ==
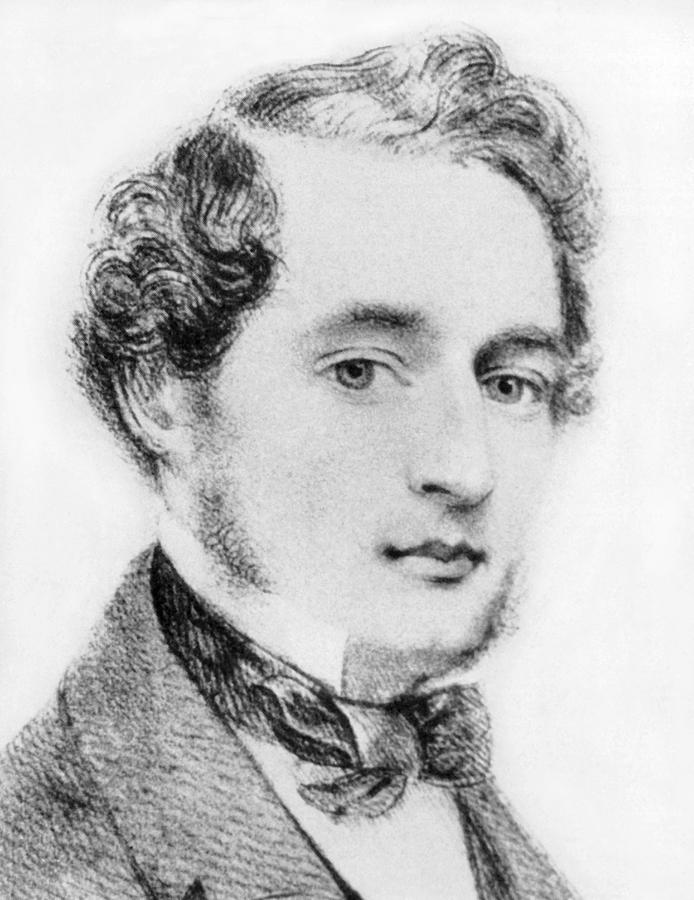
Francisco de Haro, 1st Alcalde of San Francisco, purchased Rancho Laguna de la Merced in 1837.

José Galindo was a corporal in the Presidio of San Francisco militia in Alta California. His grandfather, Nicolás Galindo, had accompanied the De Anza Expedition as a settler in Las Californias province in 1776. In 1835, José Antonio Galindo was granted the one half square league Rancho Laguna de la Merced around Lake Merced, and also received the Rancho Saucelito grant, in Alta California. His widowed mother, Ramona Sanchez de Galindo, was the grantee of Rancho Butano in 1838.

José Antonio Galindo did little to develop Rancho Laguna de la Merced and sold it in 1837 to Francisco de Haro (1792 – 1849). In a strange turn of events, in 1838, Alcalde De Haro arrested José Antonio Galindo for the murder of José Doroteo Peralta (1810 - 1838), son of Pedro Peralta. De Haro's wife, Emiliana Sanchez, died in 1842, and De Haro died in 1849.

With the cession of California to the United States following the Mexican-American War, the 1848 Treaty of Guadalupe Hidalgo provided that the land grants would be honored. As required by the Land Act of 1851, a claim for Rancho Laguna de la Merced was filed with the Public Land Commission in 1852, and the grant was patented in 1872 to the surviving De Haro children - Josefa de Haro Guerrero Denniston, Rosalia de Haro Andrews Brown, Natividad de Haro Castro Tissot, and Carlotta de Haro Denniston.

The De Haro's tried to claim land in the between Lake Merced and San Bruno Mountain. An 1853 U.S. government survey declared that the contested area was in fact government property, and could be acquired by private citizens. There was a brief land rush as squatters arrived in anticipation of Congress passing the Homestead Act that would have given legal title to 160 acres (0.6 km^{2}) to anyone already present on the land. The Greene brothers arrived in California around 1847, and squatted on part of Rancho Laguna de la Merced.

David Mahoney bought Rancho Laguna de La Merced and had another survey made. Mahoney sought to extend his property north to more desirable property and his survey included the Greenes’ homestead. Major litigation followed. George Greene won in the US District Court, and Mahoney appealed to US Supreme Court. The Greenes lost their case. The Greenes refused to leave, and built a metal-lined fort to keep out the authorities. The Greenes remained holding the fort for three months until a special Act of Congress was passed in 1887 granting them the land.

Robert S. Thornton established a claim south of Lake Merced. He was the representative of thirty property holders ("North San Mateo Settlers' Union") in the present day Colma area whose titles were in peril. In 1865 they won their case in the U.S. Supreme Court.

The Spring Valley Water Company bought the water rights for Lake Merced in 1868, and in 1877 started buying the surrounding watershed. The company began to sell off its landholdings around Lake Merced beginning in the 1890s.

== See also ==
- Ranchos of San Francisco
- Ranchos of San Mateo County, California
- List of Ranchos of California
