= Eduardo Pedemonte =

Guamanian footballer

Personal information
- Full name: Eduardo Jesus Pedemonte, Jr.
- Date of birth: July 22, 2003 (age 23)
- Position: Midfielder

Team information
- Current team: CCSF Rams
- Number: 9

College career
Years	Team	Apps	(Gls)
2021–	CCSF Rams	13	(1)

International career^{‡}
2021–	Guam	2	(0)
- ‡ National team caps and goals as of 22:58; October 12, 2021 (UTC)

Eduardo Jesus Pedemonte, Jr. (born July 23, 2003) is a footballer who plays as a midfielder for the City College of San Francisco Rams. Born and raised in the mainland United States to a Peruvian father and a Guamanian mother, he is capped for the Guam national team.

== Youth career ==
Pedemonte played high school soccer for South San Francisco High School until graduating in 2021. He was named the San Francisco Daily Journal's Player of the Week in January 2019.

== College career ==
For the 2021–2022 season, Pedemonte began playing college soccer in the United States for the Rams of City College of San Francisco.

== International career ==
In May 2021 Pedemonte was called up to Guam's senior squad for a 2022 FIFA World Cup qualification match against China. He went on to make his senior international debut in the eventual 0–7 defeat on 30 May 2021.

=== International career statistics ===
As of match played 12 October 2021

Guam national team
Year	Apps	Goals
2021	2	0
Total	2	0
