= Florida State Road 102 =

State highway in Florida, United States

State Road 102
- Airport Road
- SR 102 highlighted in red

Route information
- Maintained by FDOT
- Length: 1.609 mi (2.589 km)

Major junctions
- West end: Jacksonville International Airport
- East end: I-95 in Jacksonville

Location
- Country: United States
- State: Florida

Highway system
- Florida State Highway System; Interstate; US; State; Former; Pre‑1945; Toll; Scenic
← SR 101	→ SR 103

State Road 102 (SR 102), locally known as Airport Road, is a state highway in Jacksonville, Florida, connecting Interstate 95 with Jacksonville International Airport. State Road 243 runs south from SR 102, connecting to Interstate 295.

== Route description ==
State Road 102 is the main road into Jacksonville International Airport. Many stores and hotels line SR 102's length between I-95 and the airport. SR 102 ends just east of I-95, near River City Marketplace.

== Major intersections ==
The entire route is in Jacksonville, Duval County.

mi	km	Destinations	Notes
0.00	0.00	Jacksonville International Airport	
0.50	0.80	Pecan Park Road south – Air Cargo, Florida Air Guard, Cell Phone Lot	
1.20 0.000	1.93 0.000	Eastbound U-turn	West end of state maintenance
0.12	0.19	International Airport Boulevard south (SR 243) / Service Road (SR 102F east) to I-295 / I-10	Interchange
0.95	1.53	Service Road (SR 102F)	Westbound exit and eastbound entrance
1.168	1.880	Duval Road (CR 110 west)	
1.39	2.24	I-95 (SR 9) to I-295 – Jacksonville, Savannah	Exit 363 on I-95
1.609	2.589	East end of state maintenance	
1.70	2.74	Airport Center Drive east / Max Leggett Parkway north	
1.000 mi = 1.609 km; 1.000 km = 0.621 mi: Incomplete access

== State Road 102F ==
State Road 102F
- Location: Jacksonville
- Length: 2.280 mi (3.669 km)

State Road 102F is the designation for a pair of bi-directional frontage roads to the north and south of SR 102 known as Airport Service Road North and Airport Service Road South. Both roads terminate at SR 243 on their west end. The north frontage road's eastern terminus is at SR 102 near the I-95 interchange, while the south frontage road dead ends past Duval Road at its eastern terminus.

The combined length of SR 102F is 2.280 miles (3.669 km), making it one of the only instances of a Florida state highway's alternate route covering more mileage than its parent route.
