= Regency Square Mall (Jacksonville) =

Regency Square

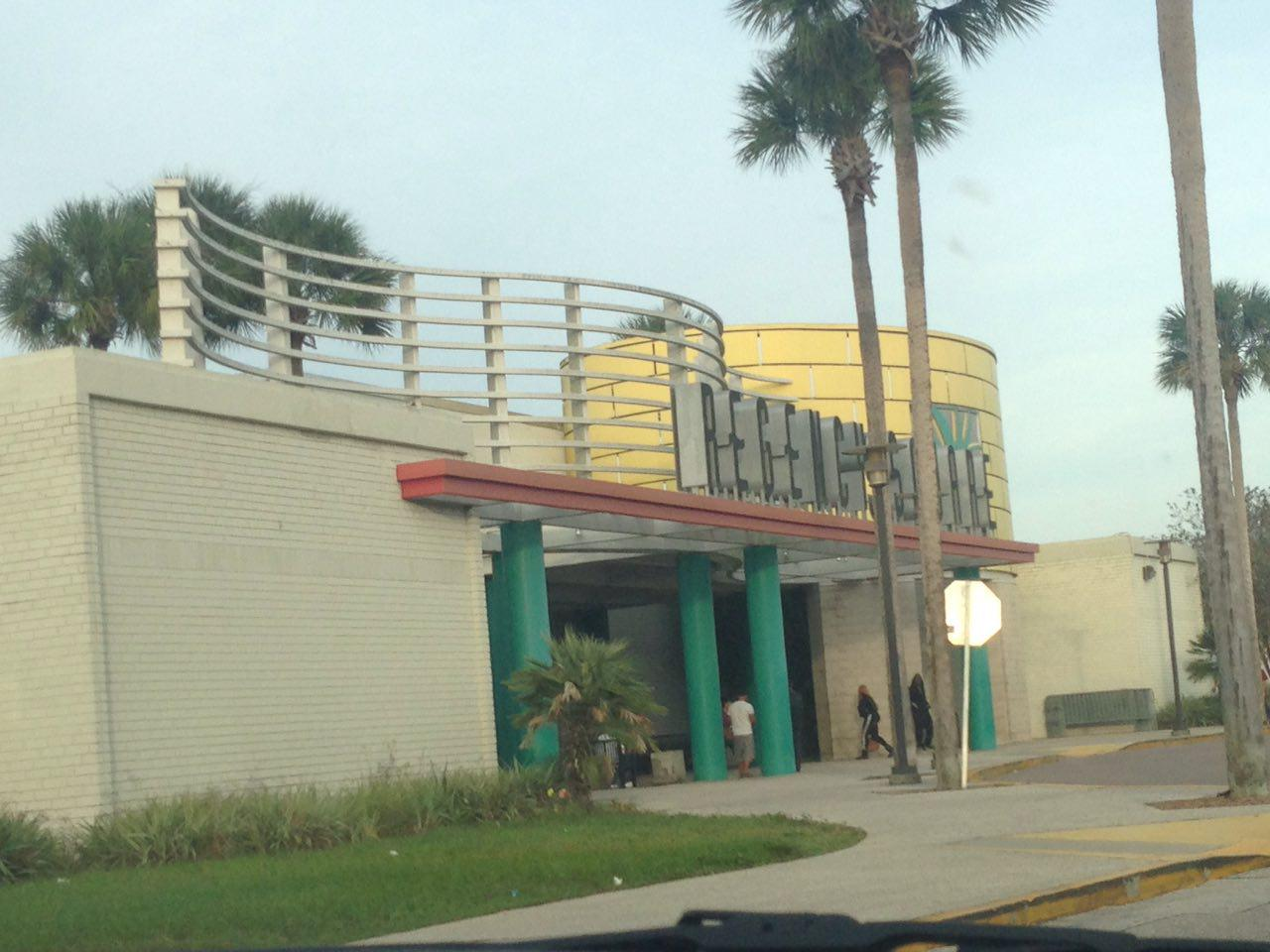
- A mall entry in 2015
- Location: Jacksonville, Florida, United States
- Coordinates: 30.321205°N 81.551487°W
- Address: 9501 Arlington Expressway
- Opened: March 2, 1967; 59 years ago
- Closed: June 1, 2025; 17 months ago
- Developer: Regency Group
- Owner: Blackwater Development LLC
- Num. of stores: 29
- Num. of anchor tenants: 5 (2 open, 3 vacant)
- Floor area: 1,390,000 square feet (129,135.2 m^{2})
- Floors: 1 (2 in anchors)
- Parking: 7,600
- Website: regencysquaremall.com

Regency Square Mall was an enclosed shopping mall in the Arlington area of Jacksonville, Florida, United States. Opened in 1967 and once one of the most successful malls in the country, the mall at its height had five anchor stores, Belk, Dillard's, JCPenney, Montgomery Ward, and Sears. The mall closed in June 2025 and today has two anchors- Dillard's Clearance Center and Impact Church, which are both separately owned and remain open. It is now currently owned by Blackwater Development LLC.

== History ==
=== Early years ===
Regency Square was constructed at a cost of $12 million by Regency Centers, on what had been sand dunes. It opened on March 2, 1967, with two anchor stores (JCPenney and May Cohens), along with an inline location of regional department store chain Ivey's. The mall also included a Woolworth dime store as a junior anchor, as well as a cafeteria-style Piccadilly restaurant. In out parcels, the single-screen (later twinned) Regency Cinema opened on the northeast corner of the property, and Annie Tiques bar and restaurant opened on the southwest corner.

According to an Urban Land Institute study published by the Florida Times-Union in 1979, it was one of the most profitable retail centers in the nation, with yearly average sales of $156/ft^{2} versus a national average of $88/ft^{2}. To give back to the community, the mall operators turned over thousands of dollars in coins from their decorative fountains to charities. All types of social events, from art, shows to science fairs to horticultural exhibits were held there.

In 1981, a $30 million major expansion nearly doubled the size of the mall, adding Sears and an anchor store sized pad for a relocated Ivey's. The former Ivey's became Furchgott's, and the existing May store was also enlarged. As a result of this expansion, the mall comprised two separate segments: the original mall between JCPenney and May Florida, and the new segment between May Florida and Sears. Furchgott's closed in 1985, when the chain merged with Stein Mart. The Regency Square location did not become a Stein Mart, as mall management considered the chain too low-end. A food court and a six-screen AMC theater was added, midway along the east wing. The southwest outparcel was removed, to make room for the expansion, requiring Annie Tiques to open a new location at the Jacksonville Landing in 1987. May Cohen's briefly operated as May Florida, before being converted to Baton Rouge-based Maison Blanche in July 1988.

In 1990, the Regency Twin theater on the northeast corner of the property closed. Picadilly's Cafeteria moved from inside the mall to a new structure built in its place. In 1991, Regency Group sold the property to General Growth Properties of Chicago for $71.8 million. In 1992, Maison Blanche was sold to Mobile-based Gayfer's via Mercantile Stores. Dillard's, who had rebranded the Ivey's store in June 1990, built a new location onto the West Wing, which opened along with 28,000 square feet (2,600 m^{2}) of new inline store space in 1992. Dillard's former store became Montgomery Ward in 1997. Woolworth closed in July 1997.

Dillard's purchased Gayfer's parent company in 1998. Both stores overlapped in this market, so this store became Belk. The mall underwent a $30 million renovation in 1998, with the addition of a new, 24-screen AMC movie complex on the northwest corner of the property to replace the existing six-screen theater inside the mall. A substation of the Jacksonville Sheriff's Office was also added, as was a food court. Old Navy also came to the mall in the late 1990s.

=== Decline ===
Regency Square announced mandatory conduct and dress codes in 1999, to deal with offensive or intimidating behavior and gang activity.

Montgomery Ward closed in 2001. Burdines briefly expressed interest in moving into the building. In 2003, General Growth talked with other retailers, including Kohl's to fill the space. In 2006, HomeWorks Furniture opened on the ground floor of the Montgomery Ward anchor building, but closed in December 2009 citing low sales.

Crime became a major issue at Regency Square, and the perception of the area as crime-ridden hurt the mall. Over 1,000 incidents were reported in 2004, the highest ever. Between September 2007 and September 2008, 650 unlawful acts were documented by the Jacksonville Sheriff's Office, more than the combined total of crimes at Jacksonville's other two major retail centers: The Avenues Mall and St. Johns Town Center. On January 26, 2008, a suspect was killed by an off-duty policeman who was called to pursue a fleeing man who had stolen a pair of jeans from the mall's Belk store. The shoplifter shot the officer four times before being fatally wounded himself.

=== Redevelopment plans ===
Just as customers had shifted from stores in the city center to Regency when it opened in 1967, the mall eventually lost business with the opening of the Avenues mall in 1990, St. Johns Town Center in 2005, and River City Marketplace in 2006. A 2010 Arlington vision plan recognized the property as ripe for redevelopment. The group's approach was to redevelop the land with transportation and density in mind, with mixed-use structures, a gridded street pattern, and infill development.

At the end of 2011, Regency's occupancy rate was just over 74%, but two years later, it had dropped below 38%. In August 2013, General Growth Properties put the mall up for sale. It was marketed as a "turn-key" power center redevelopment opportunity.

In February 2014, the mall was sold for $13 million to a pair of businesses from Great Neck, New York: Mason Asset Management and Namdar Realty Group.

Belk closed on February 17, 2015. Impact Church bought the structure in 2016.

In 2016, International Decor Outlet (IDO) announced they would take over up to 80 storefronts, but a year later, IDO was unable to fulfill expectations and became embroiled in lawsuits.

Sears closed on July 17, 2016.

In 2017, International Decor Outlet sued mall owners Namdar and Mason, citing deterioration of the structure. Other tenants similarly filed lawsuits, alleging broken air conditioning and roach infestations.

=== Closure and demolition ===
JCPenney closed on October 18, 2020, leaving Dillard's Clearance Center as the mall's sole anchor.

Impact Church opened a private school in their church in the former Belk anchor store in 2021.

In October 2021, the JSO Substation at the mall closed.

In November 2022, Regency Square Mall was given a warning citation from the City of Jacksonville's Municipal Code Compliance Division, citing commercial violations in the common areas, including a roof leak, interior ceiling damage, exposed wiring and flooring.

Blackwater Development LLC bought the mall (excluding the Impact Church, Dillard's Clearance Center, and Sears buildings) on April 9, 2025. On May 30, 2025, the mall's final restaurant, Tokyo Sakura, closed. That same day, it was announced that the final remaining tenant at the mall, Rogers Jewelers, along with the interior of the mall, would close June 1, 2025, as part of redevelopment plans for The Nexus at Regency, a mixed-use project containing multifamily housing, offices and retail space. The mall's two exterior tenants, Lauren's Seafood Blues & Jazz and Rhythm Factory, moved out of the mall before demolition begins. The anchor structures - Dillard's Clearance Center, Impact Church, JCPenney and Sears - will remain as part of the redevelopment.

Demolition of the mall structures began on September 14, 2026.

== Anchors and major retailers ==
The largest retail space was occupied by Sears with 216,711 sq. ft before the company closed its store in 2016. Three department stores are similarly sized, with former Belk (which closed down its store and became Impact Church) at 188,827 sq. ft., Dillard's Clearance Center in a 182,444 sq. ft. building but only occupying half of that and original anchor JCPenney occupying 176,019 sq. ft. before the store closed. As of 2012, there was one vacant anchor space of 115,000 sq. ft., originally home to Montgomery Ward and later, Homeworks Furniture and later a car museum that closed as well. Smaller tenants included Champs Sports/World Foot Locker (37,505 sq. ft.) and Lunar Mini Golf utilizing 24,440 sq. ft. Dillard's owns its respective store building and parking lot and Sears also did before it closed down, with the remainder belonging to Namdar Realty Group and Mason Asset Management.
