= Serra Fault =

The Serra Fault is the northernmost fault in a zone of northwest-striking range front thrust faults adjacent to and northeast of the San Francisco Peninsula segment of the San Andreas Fault, in eastern San Mateo County, California.

The Serra Fault is positioned approximately 1.5–3 kilometers (0.93–1.86 mi) northeast of the San Andreas Fault; moreover the Serra Fault extends for more than 20 km (12 mi) from the town of Hillsborough to a point near Daly City.

== Serra geology ==
According to Kennedy: "Three angular unconformities within the Merced and overlying Colma Formations have formed on the steeply dipping fold forelimb". Mid to later Holocene fluvial channel deposits inset into the Merced Formation along the forelimb of the fold seem to be deformed, illustrating that the folding is active.

The Serra Fault is a low angle imbricate fault that has thrust older Franciscan Assemblage rocks and soils of the Merced Formation over the younger Colma Formation. The Serra Fault was originally zoned as potentially active by the State of California under the mandated special studies for surface fault rupture. 1980s studies concluded that evidence for active Holocene age faulting (displacement within past 11,000 years) along the Serra Fault is lacking. The Serra Fault is, therefore, not zoned for Special Studies by the State of California and is classified as Quaternary in age: that is, fault displacement within the past two million years.

== Regional geology ==
Age constraints for coastal exposures of the Pleistocene Colma and uppermost Merced Formations have prior to 2005 been primarily correlative, generating uncertainty about the depositional history of these units as well as the timing of fault activity responsible for lifting them to elevations up to seventy meters along the northwestern coast of the San Francisco Peninsula. Yi notes that: "Recent studies have suggested that Merced and Colma deposits, as well as younger Holocene inset channel deposits, show fault-propagation fold growth and tilting" related to activity on the Serra Fault itself.

== See also ==
- Crystal Springs Reservoir

== Reference notes ==
- Kennedy, Drew G., Late Pleistocene To Holocene Fold Growth Above The Serra Fault, Northern San Francisco Peninsula, California, Sanders & Associates Geostructural Engineering, Geological Society of America (2005)
- California Division of Mines and Geology, Special Studies Zone:Serra Fault, (1974) Sacramento, California
- Earth Metrics, (1989) Marc. Papineau, Ballard. George, Jill Buxton et al., Environmental Impact Report for the Metro Center, Colma, California, Rpt Number 10062, city of Colma Planning Department and published by the California State Clearinghouse, December 1989
- Chimi Yi, Karen Grove, John Caskey, Drew Kennedy, and Glenn Berger, Depositional and Deformational History of the Colma and Uppermost Merced Formations, Southwest San Francisco, (2005), Geological Society of America
