= Rue Randall Clifford =

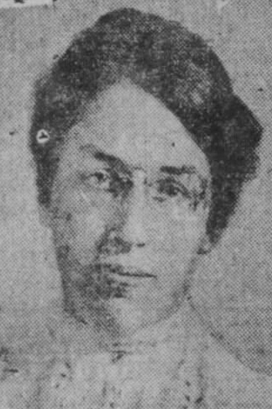
- Rue Randall Clifford, from a 1911 newspaper.
- Born: January 16, 1887; San Francisco, California
- Died: October 26, 1964 (aged 77); San Mateo, California
- Occupation: Educator

Rue Randall Clifford (January 16, 1887 – October 26, 1964) was an American educator and clubwoman. She was active in supporting library and sports opportunities in South San Francisco.

== Early life ==
Rue Randall Clifford was born in San Francisco, the daughter of M. H. Clifford and Mary Randall Clifford. Her family owned dairy farms in the Bay Area. She earned a bachelor's degree at the University of California in 1909.

== Career ==
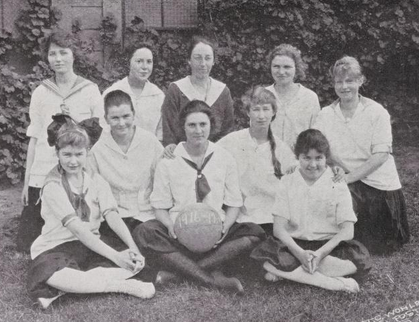
South San Francisco High School girls' basketball team, with coach Rue Randall Clifford at center of back row. From the school's 1917 yearbook.

Clifford was a musician and soprano singer and gave concerts as a young woman. She was hired to teach at South San Francisco High School in 1912, as one of the school's first three teachers, and eventually became the school's Dean of Girls. She started and coached the school's track teams, built the soccer, basketball, field hockey, and volleyball programs, directed the school musical and the glee club, and wrote the school song. "She has been a perennial committee-of-one to see practically every local football practice and game, to praise the players, to award weekly athletic awards, and to banquet the players at the end of the season", noted a local newspaper when she retired in 1955.

Clifford was a charter member of the South San Francisco Women's Club, and active in the American Association of University Women branch in San Mateo. She rode horseback to collect signatures for a Carnegie grant, to build a library in South San Francisco; Grand Avenue Library opened in 1916. She served as secretary of the library commission for almost forty years. She was co-chair of the South San Francisco Hospitality House during World War II, and she was active in the San Mateo County Historical Association. She donated her grandfather William Edgar Randall's diaries of the Gold Rush era, and other Randall family papers, to the Bancroft Library in 1955.

Clifford was an advocate of prohibition, and in 1932 objected when the San Mateo County Board of Supervisors when they supported legalizing wine and beer.

== Personal life and legacy ==
Clifford was known as a loyal follower of the University of California football team. She died in 1964, aged 77 years, at a rest home in San Mateo. In 1986, she was inducted into the San Mateo County's Women's Hall of Fame. In 2018, she was inducted into the California Library Hall of Fame.

On January 13, 2018, the city of South San Francisco marked Rue Randall Clifford Day, at the library she helped to open. The football field at South San Francisco High School is named Clifford Field, in her memory.
