= Florida State Road 243 =

State highway in Florida, United States

State Road 243
- International Airport Boulevard; Pecan Park Road
- SR 243 highlighted in red

Route information
- Maintained by FDOT
- Length: 2.255 mi (3.629 km)
- Existed: May 7, 2004–present

Major junctions
- South end: I-295 in Jacksonville
- North end: I-95 in Jacksonville

Location
- Country: United States
- State: Florida
- Counties: Duval

Highway system
- Florida State Highway System; Interstate; US; State; Former; Pre‑1945; Toll; Scenic
← SR 238	→ SR 247

State Road 243 (SR 243), locally known as International Airport Boulevard, is a 2.255-mile-long (3.629 km) state road in the northern part of Jacksonville, Florida. It runs from Interstate 295 (I-295) at Exit 33 to Interstate 95 (I-95) at Exit 366. The road's name comes from the fact that its northern terminus was originally at the entrance to Jacksonville International Airport.

== Route description ==
SR 243 serves mainly as a secondary access road for Jacksonville International Airport named International Airport Boulevard. The route starts at an interchange with I-295, and runs through mostly wooded areas and light industrial zones as a four-lane divided highway. Nearly halfway though the boulevard's journey, SR 243 has one interchange that includes one intersection at a service road that leads to SR 102 (Airport Road) and a second service road leading in the opposite direction before that route ends at the loop within the airport itself. North of SR 102 just before the intersection with Owens Road, the median along the route comes to an end and the road becomes a two-lane undivided highway.

The road runs between two plots of land owned by the Jacksonville Aviation Authority and the privately owned Jacksonville International Tradeport, respectively. International Airport Boulevard becomes a four-lane divided highway once again just before the intersection with Pecan Park Road and Bainbridge Drive, the gateway to the Bainbridge Estates residential development. As International Airport Boulevard comes to an end, SR 243 makes a sharp right turn and follows Pecan Park Road eastbound resuming its status as another four-lane divided highway until the interchange with I-95 where it terminates. East of I-95, Pecan Park narrows down to a two-lane highway once again until it crosses the CSX Kingsland Subdivision and terminates at US 17, only to become a local street named Park Avenue east of that route.

South of I-295, the road continues as Duval Road and has a hidden designation of County Road 110 (CR 110).

== History ==
International Airport Boulevard was constructed at the cost of $7.2 million, and opened on May 7, 2004 at 9:30 a.m. Prosser Hallock was in charge of the project. The route benefits those who are coming from the west part of Jacksonville. Beforehand, drivers coming to the airport from the west had two ways to get to the airport from I-295. The quickest way was to take I-295 to I-95 north, and use the Airport Road exit. Another way was to use the Duval Road exit (which now includes International Airport Boulevard) from I-295 and take a winding path to the airport using two local roads—Duval Road and Pecan Park Road. The new road created a straight shot to the airport from I-295 and shortened the drive from the west by about three miles (4.8 km).

However, the main reason International Airport Boulevard was built was in anticipation of future expansions to Jacksonville International, and in turn, more traffic to and from the airport. Future plans included expanding the airport's runways in 10 to 15 years, which in turn would result in the demolition of part of Pecan Park Road to make room for the larger runway. Further plans have included extending SR 243 even further north, and creating another access point to I-95 via the rerouted Pecan Park Road, a plan that was already implemented.

== Major intersections ==
The entire route is in Jacksonville, Duval County.

mi	km	Destinations	Notes
0.000	0.000	Duval Road south (CR 110 west)	south end of state maintenance
0.14	0.23	I-295 (SR 9A) to I-10 / I-95	I-295 exit 33
0.797	1.283	Pecan Park Road / Biscayne Boulevard to Duval Road north (CR 110 east) - Air National Guard, Air Cargo	
2.255	3.629	To I-95 / Airport Road (SR 102) / Service Road (SR 102F east) – Jacksonville International Airport	interchange
		Pecan Park Road west to Arnold Road / Bainbridge Drive north	SR 243 turns east onto Pecan Park Road.
		I-95 (SR 9) – Jacksonville, Savannah	I-95 exit 366; north end of state maintenance; Pecan Park Road continues to US 17.
1.000 mi = 1.609 km; 1.000 km = 0.621 mi
