= Baden High School =

Coordinates: 37°39′00″N 122°26′10″W

- 825 Southwood Drive, South San Francisco, California 94080; United States

Information
- Type: Public Continuation high school
- School district: South San Francisco Unified School District
- Principal: Michael Coyne
- Staff: 9.36 (FTE)
- Enrollment: 118 (2023–2024)
- Student to teacher ratio: 12.61
- Website: https://baden.ssfusd.org/

Baden High School is a public continuation high school in the city of South San Francisco, California. The school is part of the South San Francisco Unified School District.

The school is named for the Baden neighborhood of South San Francisco, formerly the town of Baden before South San Francisco was incorporated.

The school serves approximately 100 students. Specialized programs include a Regional Occupation Program (ROP) program for hotel and hospitality work and a Teen Age Parenting Program.

== See also ==
- San Mateo County high schools
