= Koi Palace =

Chinese restaurant in Daly City, California, U.S.

- Interactive map of Koi Palace

Restaurant information
- Location: 365 Gellert Boulevard, Daly City, California, 94015, United States
- Coordinates: 37°39′58″N 122°28′0″W

Koi Palace is a Chinese restaurant in Daly City, California. It was a semifinalist in the Outstanding Restaurant category of the James Beard Foundation Awards.

== See also ==
- List of Chinese restaurants
