= Bayshore City, California =

Bayshore City was an incorporated city in San Mateo County, California, United States. The primary driving force for its incorporation in 1932 was to create an area near San Francisco where greyhound racing could be legal and practiced. Consisting of about 30 blocks and containing about 800 residents at its foundation, the city was disincorporated in 1940 in the wake of the illegalization of dog racing in California in 1939. The area, largely behind where the Cow Palace is today, was annexed to Daly City in 1963.
