= John Donald Daly =

American businessman

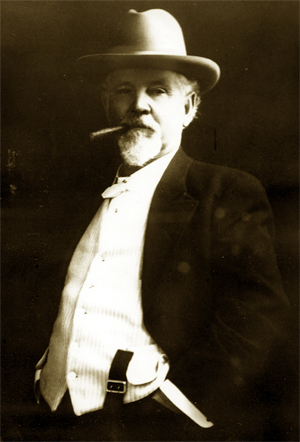
- Born: 1841; Boston, Massachusetts, U.S.
- Died: January 1, 1923 (aged 81–82)
- Known for: Namesake of Daly City, California

John Donald Daly (1841 – January 1, 1923) was a California businessman and landowner from Boston, Massachusetts. The city of Daly City, California, was named after him when it was incorporated in 1911. He is widely regarded as the "father of Daly City" and is an important figure in the history of the city that bears his name. He also opened the city's first bank.

== Bibliography ==
- Gillespie, Bunny; Crimmen, Dave (2011). Daly City (eBook). Charleston, South Carolina: Arcadia Publishing. ISBN 978-0-7385-7523-0. OCLC 746551642.
