= Brisbane School District =

School district in California, United States

Coordinates: 37°41′10″N 122°24′29″W

Address
- 1 Solano Street Brisbane, California, 94005; United States

District information
- Type: Public
- Grades: K–8
- NCES District ID: 0606060

Students and staff
- Students: 474 (2020–2021)
- Teachers: 29.91 (FTE)
- Staff: 33.57 (FTE)
- Student–teacher ratio: 15.85:1

Other information
- Website: www.brisbanesd.org

Brisbane School District is a school district in California. It consists of Lipman Middle School, Brisbane Elementary School, and Panorama Elementary School.

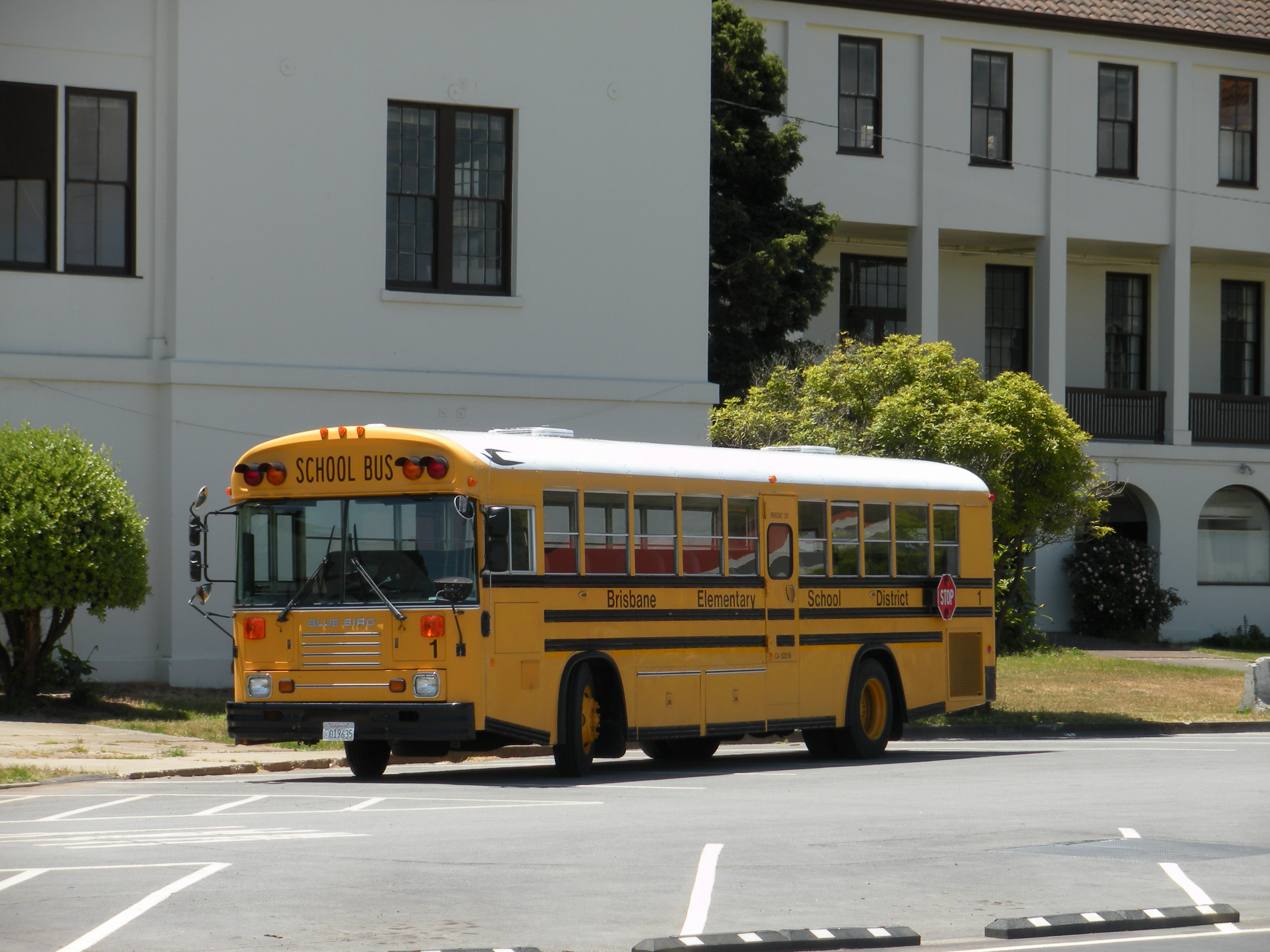
A photograph of a school bus operated by the Brisbane (CA) Elementary School District. The bus is a 72-passenger 1992-1999 Blue Bird TC/2000 Rear Engine.
