= South San Francisco High School =

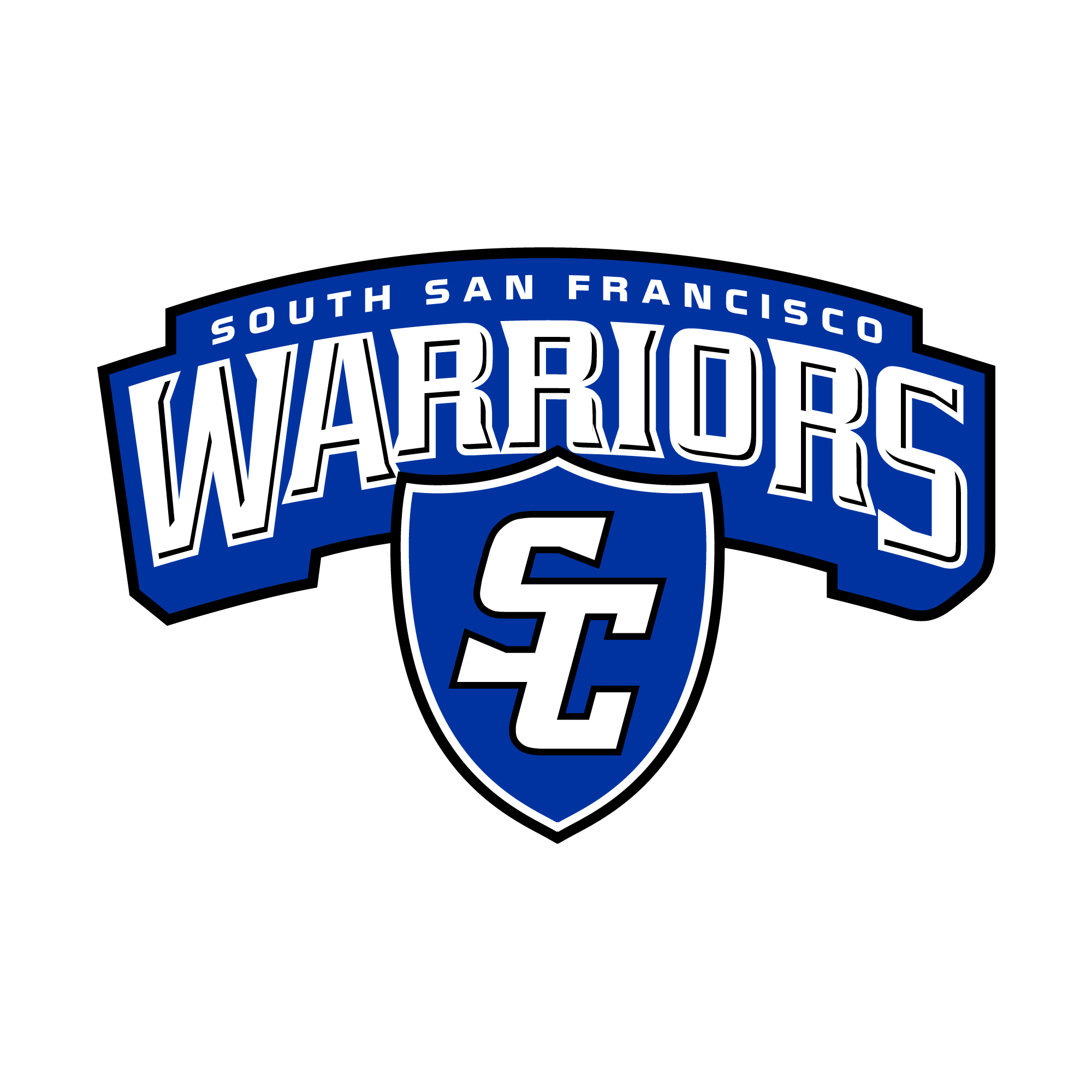

- Main entrance

Location
- 400 B Street; South San Francisco, California 94080; United States; 37.647828°N 122.426287°W

Information
- Type: Public high school
- Motto: Warrior State of Mind
- Established: 1913; 113 years ago
- School district: South San Francisco Unified School District
- Principal: Shari Balisi Manalang
- Faculty: 71.10 (FTE)
- Grades: 9-12
- Enrollment: 1,287 (2023–2024)
- Student to teacher ratio: 18.10
- Campus type: Suburban
- Colors: Blue and white
- Mascot: Warriors
- Website: southcity.ssfusd.org

South San Francisco High School (known colloquially as South City High) is a 9-12 public high school in South San Francisco, California, United States and is part of the South San Francisco Unified School District (SSFUSD).

Vision Statement: South San Francisco High School will graduate resilient, empathetic, lifelong learners who will become productive, globally conscious citizens with useful skills to contribute to an ever changing society.

== Campus ==
South San Francisco High School operates under a closed campus policy, prohibiting leaving the campus for lunch or meeting visitors and students during school hours. The district offices for the SSFUSD are located on the school campus at the main entrance.

South San Francisco High School is composed of a main office building, school library, auditorium, cafeteria large and small gyms, Science Garage, and nine campus wings. Wings B-G contain the majority of the school's academic classrooms. The "S" wing contains the woods, auto, ceramics, and art shops. The auditorium is located to the right of the main entrance with the cafeteria next to it. The "M" wing contains the broadcasting station and the band room. The video broadcasting class provides live segments daily through the schools cable network and online.

Brand new, on-campus baseball and softball diamonds opened in 2021, replacing two grassy practice fields in addition to the off-campus Bob Brian Field at Orange Memorial Park which had previously served as South City baseball's home field.

"Students have access to state-of-the-art equipment at the Science Garage biotech lab and classroom. Science Garage was built at South San Francisco High School with support from a $7.8 million grant from the Genentech Foundation, and opened in late 2017".

On April 1, 2019, students and staff planted 14 orange, persimmon, and apple trees in a new campus orchard.

An outdoor learning space was constructed in 2021 in a section of unused lawn space. The learning space includes picnic tables and benches for students to utilize during lunch as well as a projector and screen for outdoor lessons. The perimeter is lined with native plants and vegetables planted and maintained by the SSFHS Earth Club. Vegetables will be donated to Mission Meals.

== Demographics ==
White	Latino	Asian	African American	Pacific Islander	American Indian	Two or More Races
4.4%	57%	30.6%	1.4%	2.1%	0.2%	4.4%

According to U.S. News & World Report, 95% of South San Francisco's student body is "of color," with 44% of the student body coming from an economically disadvantaged household, determined by student eligibility for California's Reduced-price meal program.

== School logo and mascot ==
On Thursday, February 28, 2020, “school district officials adopted a student proposal to abandon Native American imagery considered insensitive and unnecessary.” The school will retain the Warrior mascot without the Native American imagery.

The proposal was advocated for by the South San Francisco High School's Students 4 Change group with the support of many current and former students, faculty members, and community members. They considered the logo depicting a generalized Native American man in a feathered headdress to be a stereotypical and disrespectful portrayal of indigenous people. SSFHS Students 4 Change circulated a petition, created an informative video, and presented to the school board prior to its official decision.

Support for the proposal was not universal. A competing petition was also circulated in favor of keeping the logo. Many students, faculty, community members, and one board member viewed the logo as a way to honor the Native Americans who formerly occupied the area as well as a way to honor school tradition and history.

Even so, it has been noted that even before this particular proposal, the school had been gradually phasing out the imagery over time. Several athletic uniforms and fields often sported “SC” for South City instead of the Native American headdress logo. The only physical mascot in recent years was the short lived tenure of “Wolfie” the Wolf.

Shortly after the board voted to change the school logo, a research committee was formed of students, parents, faculty members, and community members to gather input for developing a new logo. The school board voted unanimously to approve the new logos on March 25, 2021.

== Academics ==
Wanting to provide opportunities for all students to be successful after high school whether they choose to go to college or immediately enter the workforce and begin their chosen careers, South San Francisco High Schools offers pathways for both College and Career Readiness.

College readiness For students wishing to attend college after graduation, South San Francisco High School offers courses satisfying the A-G requirements needed for acceptance into a public California university. The rigorous academic program includes 14 Advanced Placement courses (Biology, Physics, Chemistry, Calculus AB, Language & Composition, Literature & Composition, Computer Science, World History, US History, Government, European History, Spanish, Italian, and Music Theory) and multiple honors courses. While these higher-level courses are not required to graduate, they are recommended for students wishing to be more competitive when applying to college.

Skyline College works closely with the high school through after school workshops about registering for classes and financial aide, concurrent enrollment, and programs such as Middle College, Kapatiran, and Herman@s. Both Kapatiran and L@s Hermano@s are after school seminar classes taught by Skyline College professors for which students can earn both high school and college credits.

Advancement Via Individual Determination (AVID) is an elective program offered at South San Francisco High School. While part of this program, students learn useful skills (such as note-taking, organization, collaboration, critical thinking, etc.), conduct research on possible future colleges and careers, attend field trips to visit college campuses, and more.

Sophomore and Junior year, all students enrolled in either World History or US History compete in National History Day. This project involves three components: research paper, physical project, and presentation. Students may choose a historical topic of their choice, but it must fit into that year's History Day Theme (previous themes include Triumph and Tragedy, Innovation, Turning Point, Rights & Responsibility, etc.). They then do in depth research of their topic in order to write their papers. Next they create a documentary film, website, performance or exhibit. Finally their projects are presented in a school-wide competition which can lead on to county, state, and national competitions. South City students have competed at the state level multiple times in recent years.

Career readiness Career Technical Education (CTE), also known as Vocational Education classes are offered in a variety of subjects for students to explore possible career fields, including: Arts, Media & Entertainment; Building & Construction Trades; Health Science & Medical Technology; Information & Communication Technologies; and Transportation.

Work Experience and Community Service courses allow students to earn high school credits while gaining hands on experience outside of the classroom.

During their senior year, students complete a Senior Capstone Project in their English classes. The purpose of this project is to apply and showcase the skills they have learned over the all their four years of high school and to explore in depth a career field that interests them. They write a research paper about a controversial topic in their chosen career field. Next students complete at least 25 hours learning from/shadowing a mentor who works in that field, constantly updating a blog recounting the experience and creating a physical project based on what they learn. Physical projects can include but are not limited to: cellphone and computer based applications, choreographed dance routines, video interviews/montages/documentaries, and more. Finally, they present to a panel of faculty members, other students, and community members about what they learned through the whole experience.

== Athletics ==
South San Francisco High School offers a variety of sports, including cheerleading, American football, badminton, baseball, basketball, golf, soccer, softball, swimming, tennis, track and field, volleyball, wrestling and cross country.

Bell Game

The Bell Game is an annual tradition where South San Francisco High School plays against their rival, El Camino High School. The school that wins the football game wins the trophy, also known as "The Bell." The 2011 Bell Game was the 50th.

Special Olympics

"Just before the pandemic closures of 2020, South San Francisco held its first ever Special Olympics Northern California basketball tournament." After not being held in 2021 due to the COVID pandemic, the tournament returned in 2022 featuring teams from South San Francisco, Woodside, and Hillsdale High Schools. The tournament is planned to become an annual event.

Notable seasons

In 1980 the varsity football team defeated North Monterey County HS, 17–7, to win the Central Coast Section Championship. In 1973, the sophomore football team went undefeated and unscored upon. In 2021, the girls soccer team made school history with the program's first CCS title after four previous years of making it to CCS Playoffs.

== Notable alumni & faculty ==
Alumni

- Doug Aronson (class of 1983?), The offensive lineman appeared in two games for the Cincinnati Bengals in 1987.
- James H. Coleman (class of 2017), Youngest and first openly LGBTQ member of the South San Francisco City Council. Elected in SSF District 4 in 2020.
- Patrick Hunter (class of 1983), A third-round pick out of Nevada in 1986, Hunter started 99 games at cornerback for the Seahawks over nine seasons in Seattle.
- Milford Hodge (class of 1980?), Hodge played defensive line for the Patriots from 1986 to 1989.
- Salifu Jatta, professional footballer

Faculty

- Rue Randall Clifford, One of SSFHS's first teachers. The school's football field is named Clifford Field in her honor.
- Gene Mullin, Former SSFHS teacher & coach, City Council Member, Mayor, and State Assembly Member

== See also ==
- San Mateo County high schools
