= Equity One =

American real estate investment trust

Equity One, Inc.
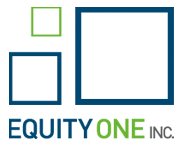
- Industry: Real estate investment trust
- Founded: 1992; 34 years ago
- Defunct: March 1, 2017; 9 years ago
- Headquarters: New York City
- Key people: Chaim Katzman, Chairman; David Lukes, CEO & President; Matthew Ostrower, CFO
- Revenue: ▲$375 million (2016)
- Net income: ▲$72 million (2016)
- Total assets: ▲$3.494 billion (2016)
- Total equity: ▲$1.840 billion (2016)
- Number of employees: 143 (2016)

Equity One, Inc. was a real estate investment trust that invested in shopping centers in New York, Boston, Washington D.C., San Francisco, Los Angeles, Atlanta and Florida. As of December 31, 2016, it owned 122 properties comprising 12.8 million square feet.

In March 2017, the company was acquired by Regency Centers.

== History ==
The company was founded in 1992 and became a public company via an initial public offering in 1998.

In March 2017, the company was acquired by Regency Centers.
