= Lake Merced =

- Spanish: Laguna de Merced
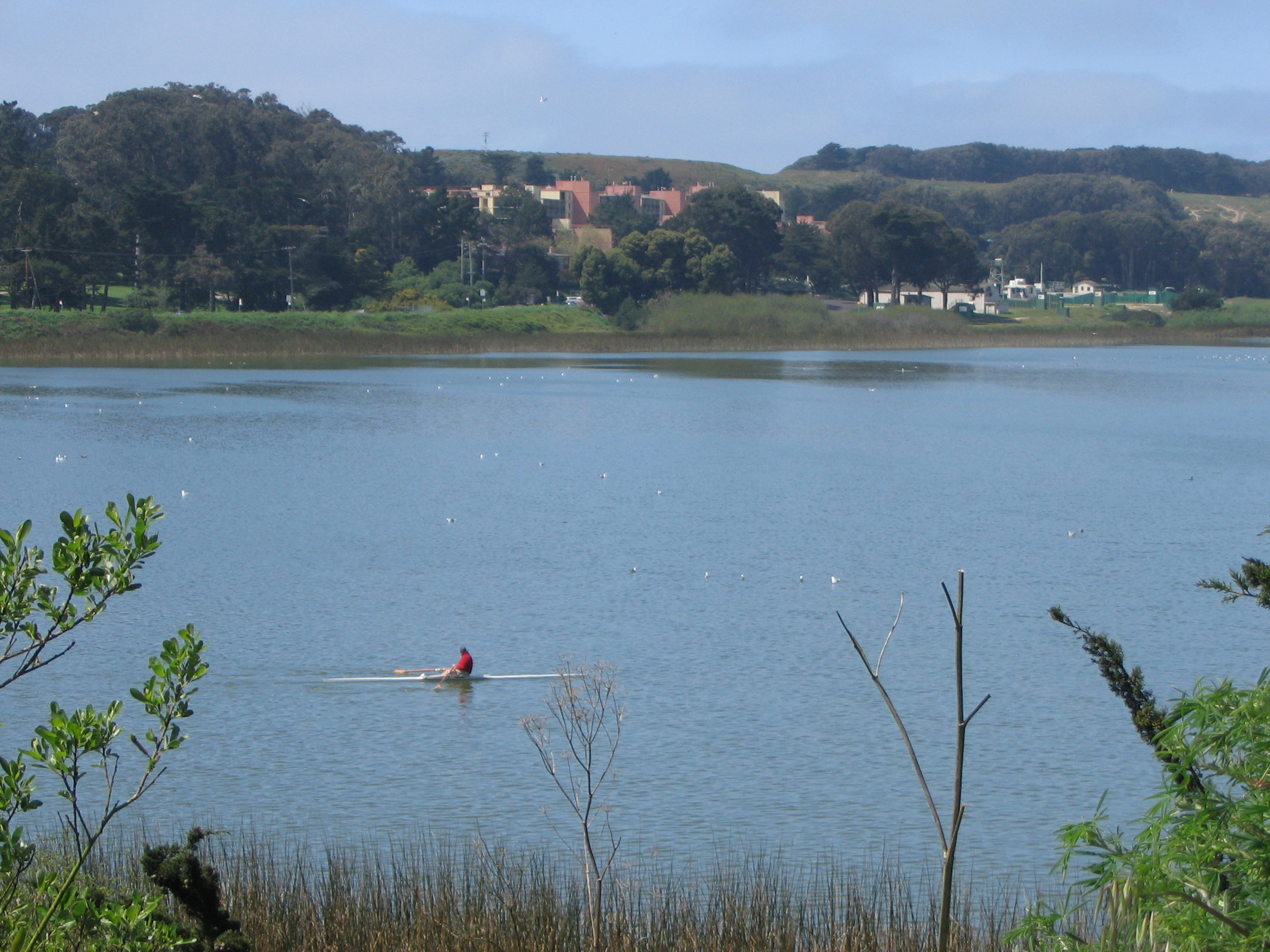
- Location: San Francisco, California
- Coordinates: 37.72°N 122.495°W
- Type: Reservoir
- Primary inflows: Spring
- Basin countries: United States
- Surface area: 650 acres (260 ha)
- Surface elevation: 23 ft (7 m)
- References: U.S. Geological Survey Geographic Names Information System: Lake Merced
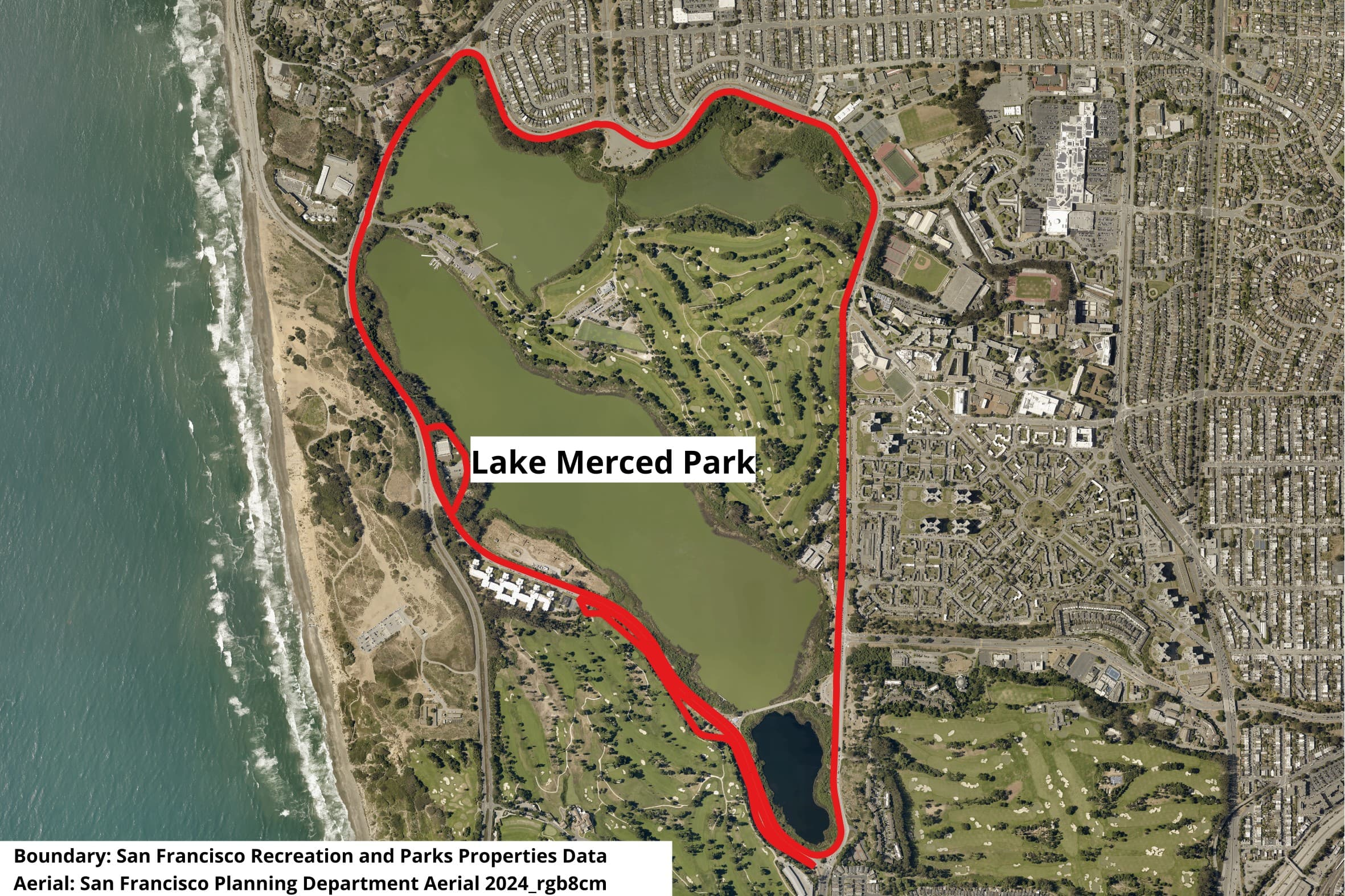
- 2024 aerial of Lake Merced Park
- Type: Municipal (San Francisco)
- Area: 614 acres (2.48 km^{2}; 0.96 sq mi)
- Created: 1940s
- Status: Open all year

Lake Merced (Spanish: Laguna de Merced) is a freshwater lake located on the West Side of San Francisco, in the southwest corner of the city. It is surrounded by three golf courses (the private Olympic Club and San Francisco Golf Club, and the public TPC Harding Park), as well as residential areas, Lowell High School, San Francisco State University, Lakeshore Alternative Elementary School, Stonestown Galleria, Fort Funston and the Pacific Ocean. The San Francisco Police Department shooting range, as well as a now closed skeet shooting club and the city's National Guard armory are also in the area. The lake was also the home of the Lake Merced Sailing Club, now closed, which provided training and racing for local sailors. Currently there is a paddling program operated by San Francisco State University. The lake is home of the Pacific Rowing Club and St. Ignatius College Prep Rowing Team, both competitive rowing programs for San Francisco high school students.

The California Office of Environmental Health Hazard Assessment (OEHHA) has developed a safe eating advisory for Lake Merced based on levels of mercury found in fish caught from this water body.

== History ==
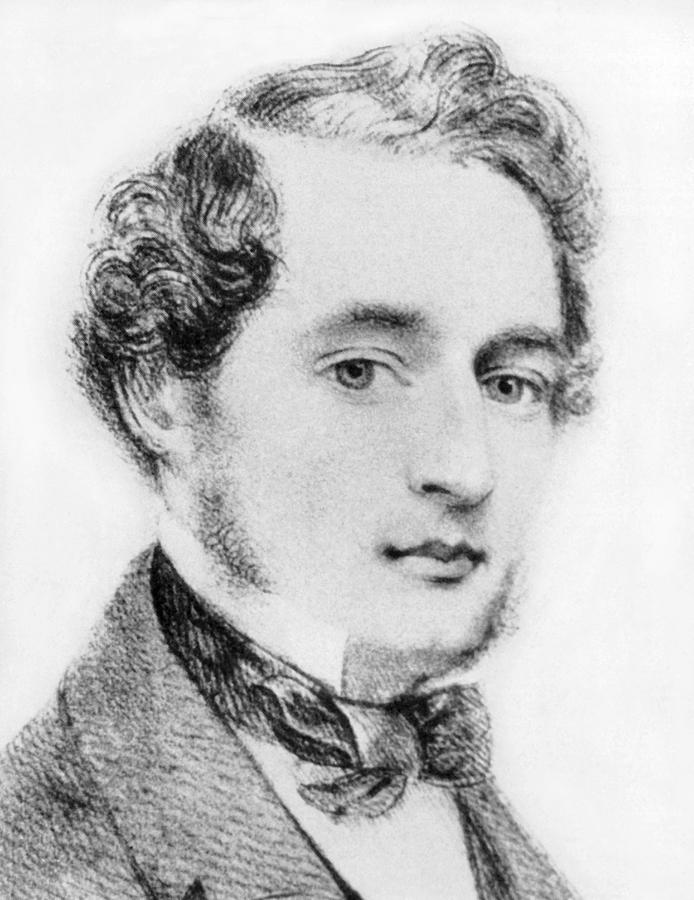
Francisco de Haro, 1st Alcalde of San Francisco (Mayor), purchased Rancho Laguna de la Merced, which included Lake Merced, in 1837.

Lake Merced was originally christened Laguna de Nuestra Señora de la Merced by Captain Don Bruno de Heceta in 1775. Father Pedro Font, while on the de Anza Expedition to found the Presidio of San Francisco in March, 1776 wrote in his diary, "we saw a grove of live oaks near which is the Laguna de la Merced, where Captain Ribera stopped; and here we saw many bears (California Grizzly Bear)..."

At approximately 11pm of November 22, 1852, a shock was reported to have occurred by those in the areas around the Lake and the following day reports were made that "...a fissure half a mile wide and three hundred yards long was discovered, through which the waters of Lake Merced were flowing to the sea." The most probable cause of the shock was attributed to heavy rains forcing a passage through the sandbank at the north-west. The Lake is reported to have lost 30 feet (9.1 meters) of water. A map from 1881 shows that the Lake still had a passage to sea, 29 years later.

Once owned by Francisco De Haro, first Alcalde of Yerba Buena, as part of the Galindo ranch, the Spring Valley Water Company bought the water rights for the Lake in 1868, and the surrounding watershed in successive years. By purchasing all local supply, the company created a monopoly on San Francisco's water. It was not until 1908, when the city approved construction of O'Shaughnessy Dam creating the Hetch Hetchy Reservoir in the Sierra Nevada mountain range, that the city gained municipal control. Prior to the construction of the dam, Lake Merced was to serve as the city's main reservoir, with plans to expand the lake into land that is now the San Francisco State University campus. Around this time, Spring Valley sold off some of its land on Lake Merced, making way for the golf courses that exist today. In 1940, Metropolitan Life bought the last of Spring Valley's land to build the Parkmerced apartment complex.

== Ecology ==
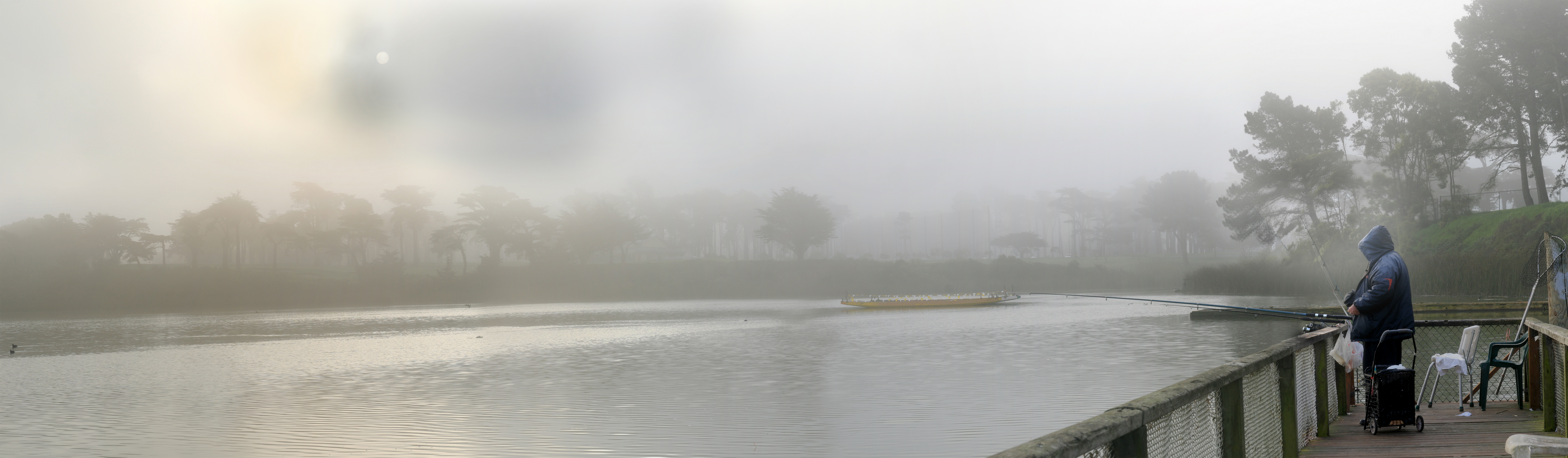
Foggy Morning at Lake Merced.

The lake is fed by an underground spring, and at one time it did have an outlet to the ocean as shown on an 1869 United States Coast and Geodetic Survey Map. The salt level was always fluctuating, and therefore some species of fish which inhabit the lake are salt and freshwater adapted. There is active recreational fishing at the lake.

The lake's water level had been shrinking for decades, endangering the historic role of Lake Merced to support a healthy ecosystem. Due to better management of the aquifer and occasional additions of water, lake level has been rising since 1990. The only natural freshwater lakes in San Francisco are Pine Lake, Lake Merced, and Mountain Lake.

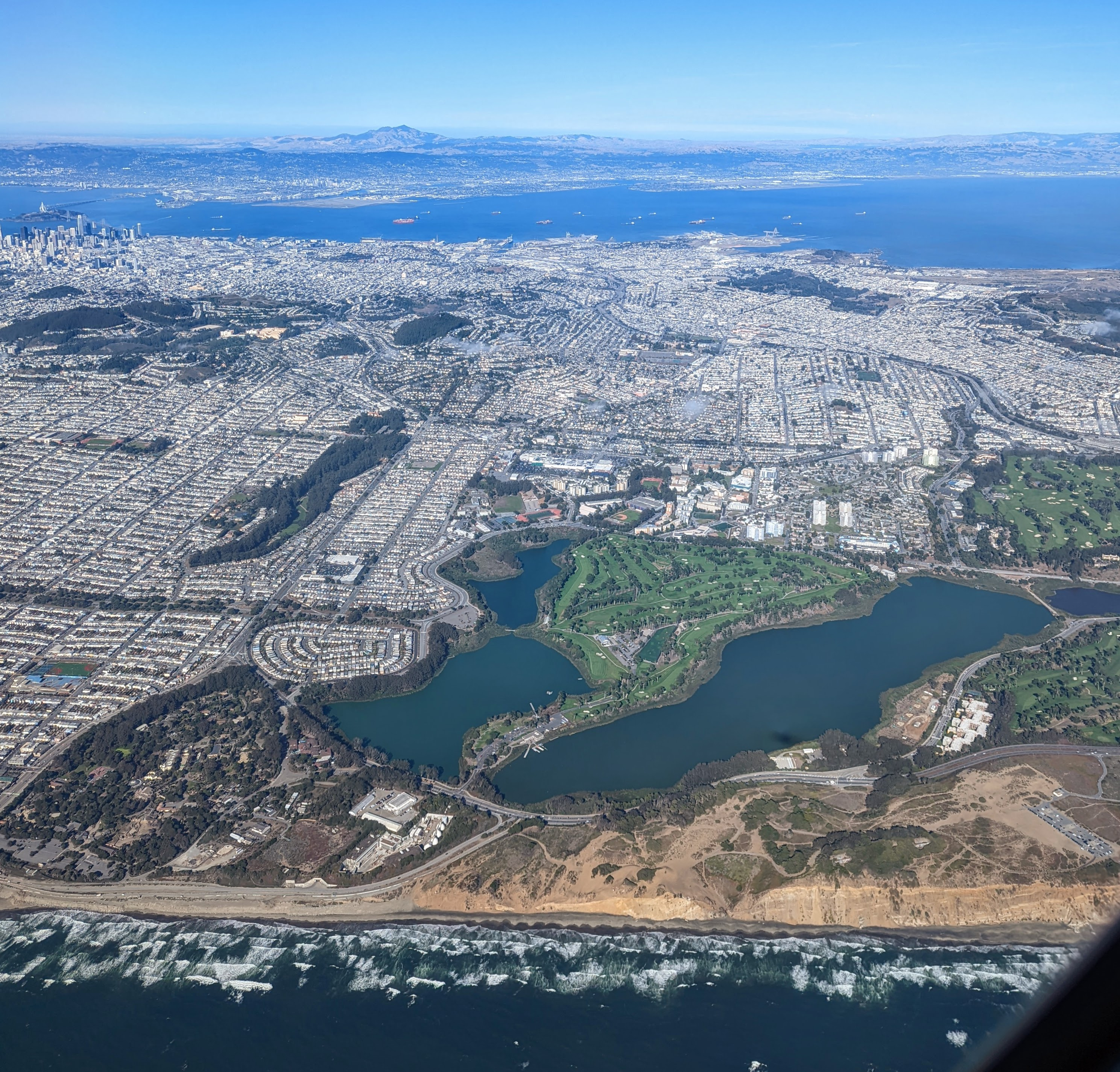
Aerial view, looking east, of Lake Merced Park, Fort Funston, and the San Francisco Zoo, surf in foreground

== Famous duel ==
On September 13, 1859, Chief Justice of the California Supreme Court David S. Terry killed United States Senator David C. Broderick in a duel at the lake.

== See also ==
- 49-Mile Scenic Drive
- List of lakes in the San Francisco Bay Area
- Rancho Laguna de la Merced
