= Serramonte =

Coordinates: 37°40′08″N 122°28′10″W

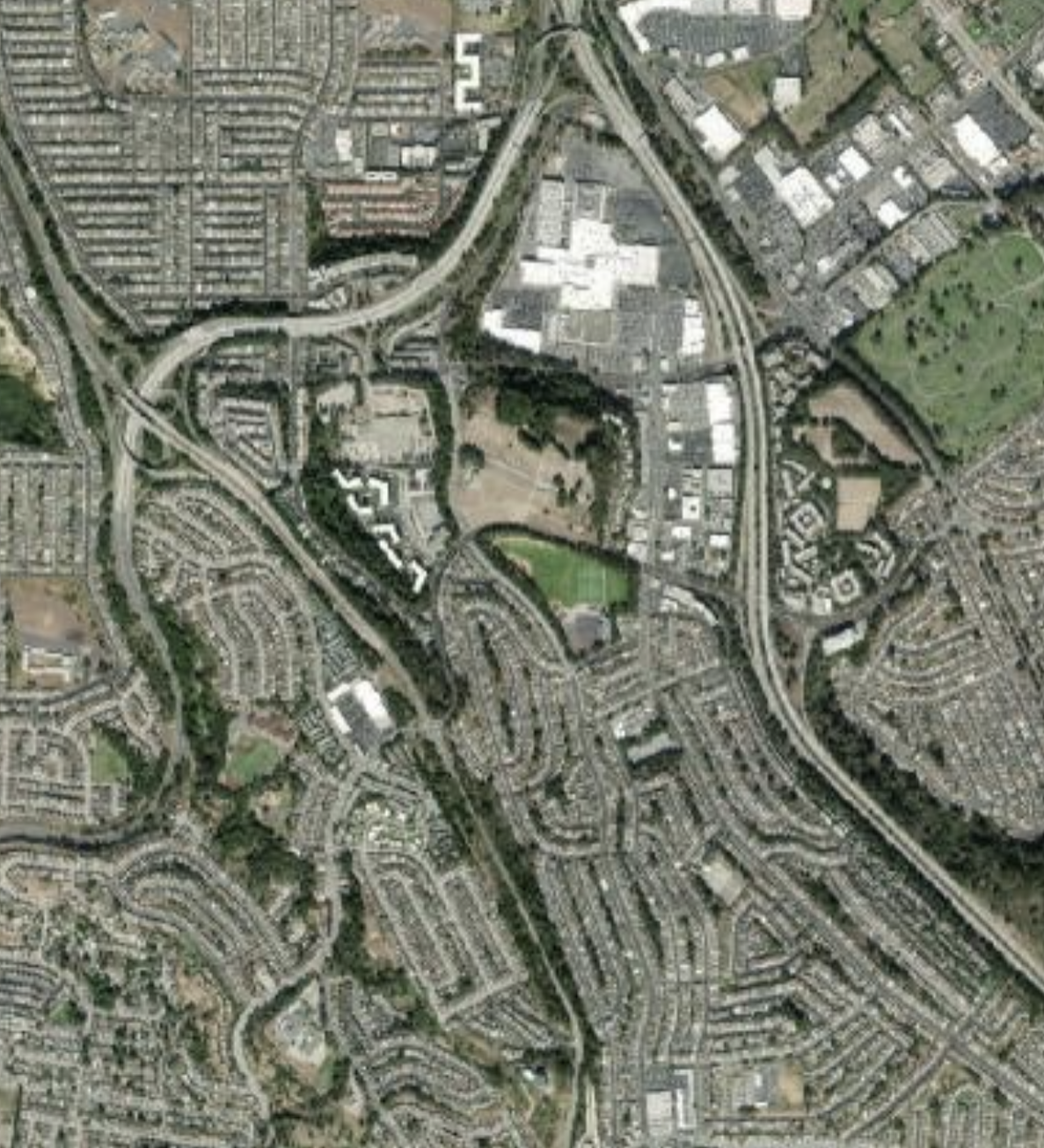
Aerial view of the Serramonte neighborhood

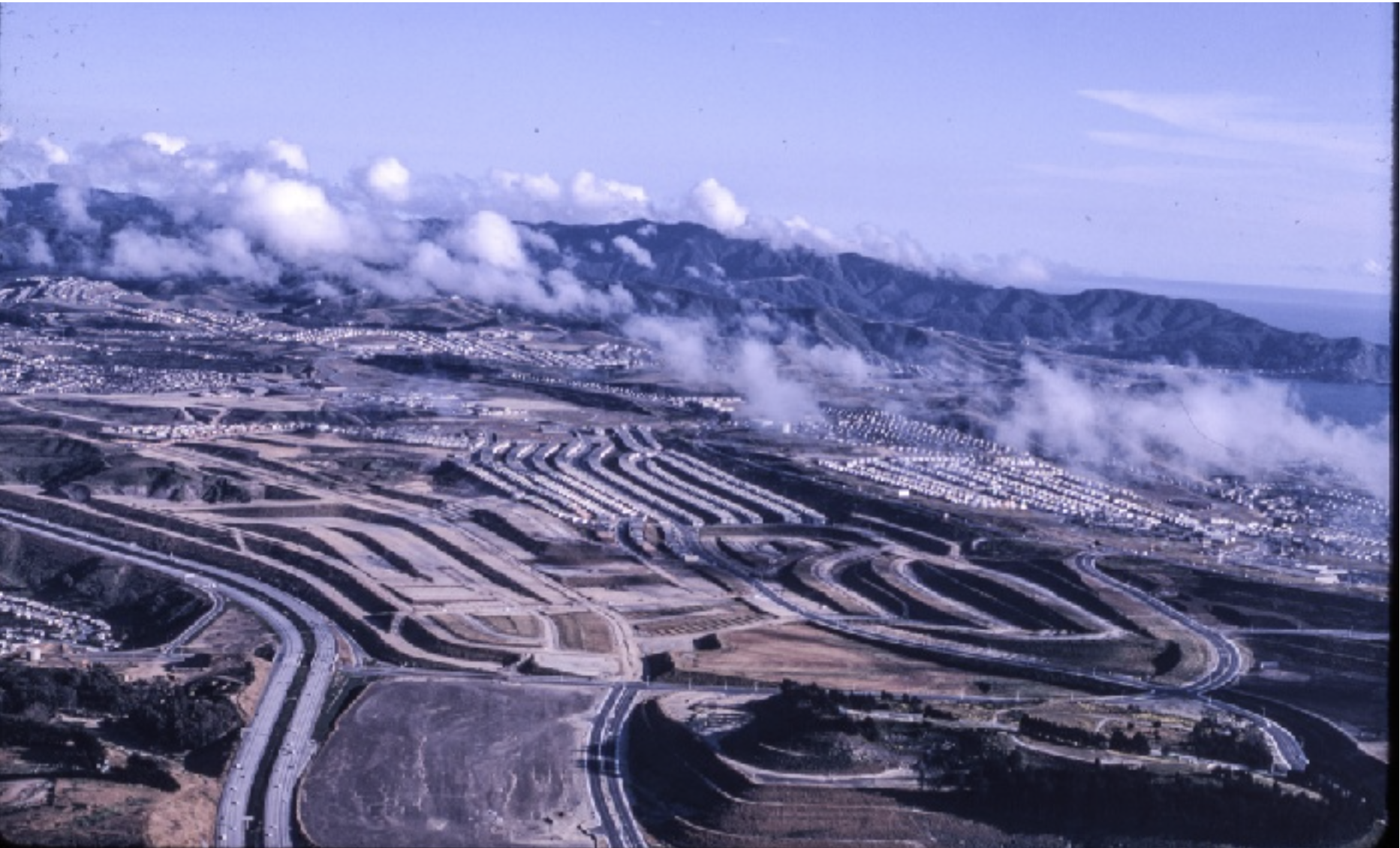
Aerial view of Serramonte under construction, June 1969

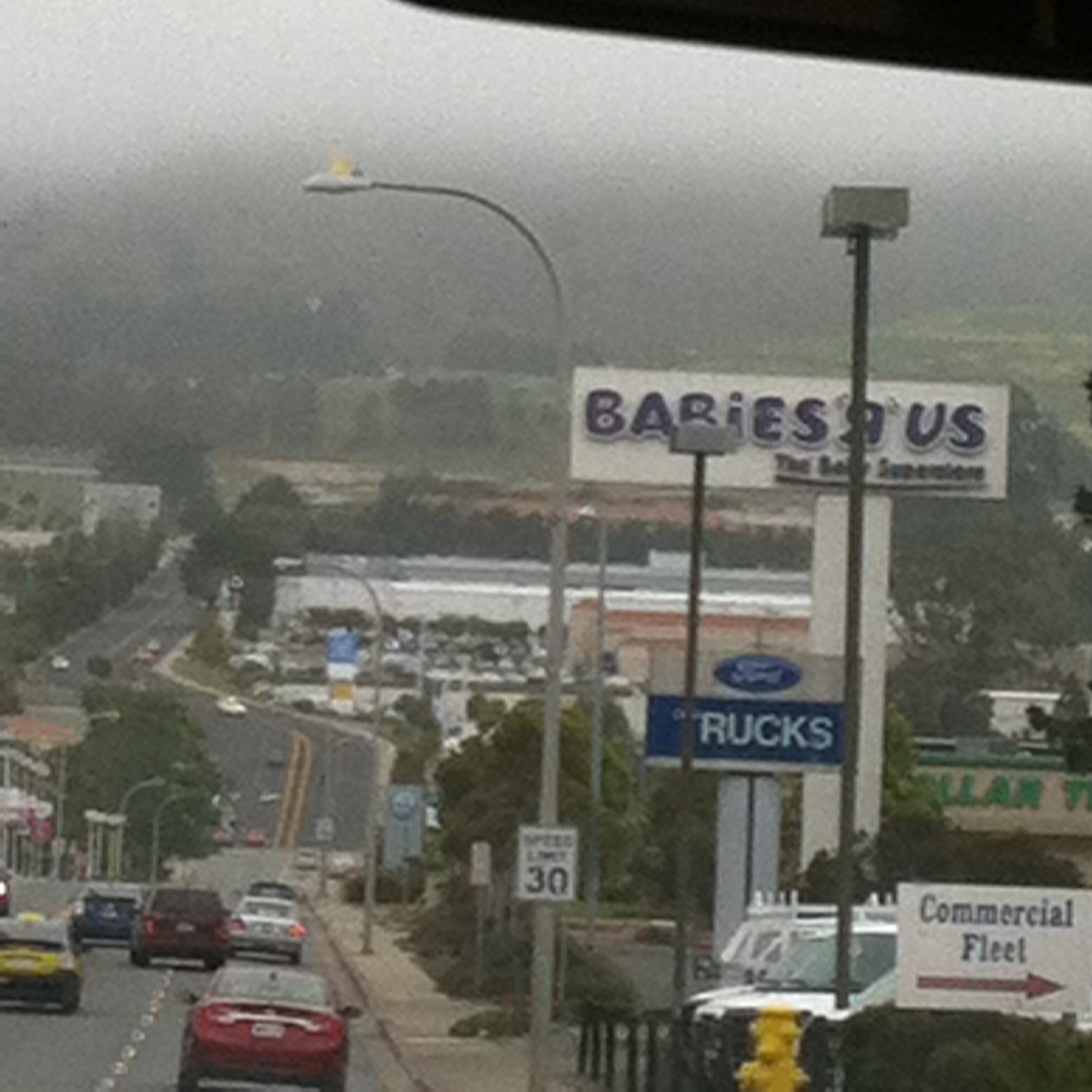
Serramonte Boulevard, a major street

Serramonte is a large 1960s residential neighborhood on the border of Daly City and Colma in the suburbs south of San Francisco, California, that is also home to numerous shopping malls, strip malls, and big box retailers.

The neighborhood was developed beginning in 1963 by Fred and Carl Gellert's Suburban Realty Company on a former dairy ranch. Serramonte High School, built in 1970 and closed in 1981, was at one time one of the largest schools by enrollment in Daly City.

The nexus of the neighborhood is Serramonte Center, near the intersection of State Route 1 and Interstate 280, in the triangle formed by Callan Boulevard, Serramonte Boulevard, and Junipero Serra Boulevard, which opened in 1968. The mall is particularly popular with Filipinos, who moved to Daly City in large numbers in the 1970s.
