= River City Marketplace =

- Location: Jacksonville, Florida, United States
- Coordinates: 30.4775°N 81.6407°W
- Opened: November 17, 2006
- Manager: RPT Realty
- Owner: RPT Realty
- Num. of stores: 72
- Num. of anchor tenants: 4
- Floor area: 879,001 sq ft (82,000 m^{2})
- Floors: 1
- Parking: 4,807

River City Marketplace (RCM) is a quasi-regional outdoor shopping mall in the Northside of Jacksonville, Florida, and the only one north of the St. Johns River. It opened its doors on November 17, 2006, with three major anchor stores including Walmart, Lowe's and Regal Cinemas River City Marketplace 14. The fourth, Gander Mountain, opened ten months later and closed in 2017. The 125-acre (0.51 km^{2}) shopping district is located south of Airport Road on the east side of Interstate 95, two miles (3 km) east of Jacksonville International Airport (JIA). When Phase II is fully built out, the project will have cost over $300 million to build and boast more than 100 retailers.

== Original plans ==
The original plan for the $300 million, 425-acre (1.72 km^{2}) mixed-use project included a 125-acre (0.51 km^{2}) shopping district, 900 residential units, 300 hotel rooms, and 133,000 ft2 of light industrial space. The retail center, developed by Ramco Gershenson, will eventually include 1,130,000 square feet (105,000 m^{2}) of retail space and should attract shoppers from Nassau County and southeast Georgia.

== Movies ==
Hollywood Theaters built a 62,000 sq ft (5,800 m^{2}) stand-alone building at the mall's south end. All 14 screens featured stadium seating when it opened on September 21, 2006. Portland, Oregon-based Hollywood Theaters planned to spend nearly $14 million on the project, which is managed by Wallace Theaters. In 2013, it was purchased by Regal Entertainment Group to become Regal Cinemas River City Marketplace 14. In August 2022, the theater closed its doors, and was later confirmed to be the site of a previously approved BJ's Wholesale Club location. It was demolished in December 2022 to make way for the new construction.

== Current status ==
While the RCM that exists today is not exactly what the "developers originally intended", it "is still the largest shopping center to be constructed on [Jacksonville’s] Northside" and provides "an array of retail destinations that previously" were only available across the river or in Orange Park, a drive of approximately 20 minutes. One residential complex has been opened, with another on hold until the 2008 financial crisis abates.

In January 2024 Kimco Realty completed the acquisition of RPT, adding River City Marketplace to their portfolio.
