= Oyster Point Marina/Park =

Marina and park in South San Francisco, California

Oyster Point Park
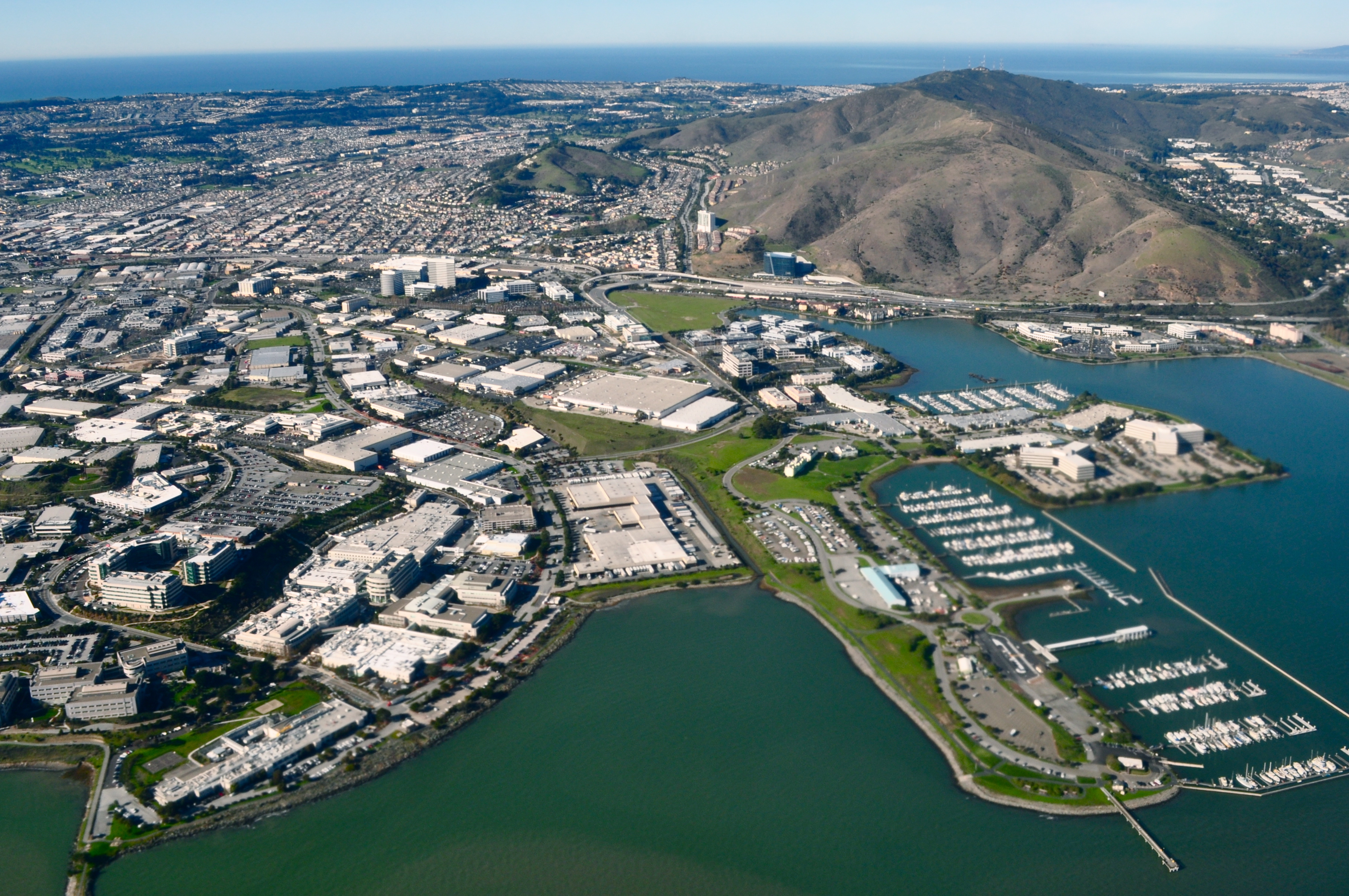
- Aerial photograph of Oyster Point Park and Marina, with San Bruno Mountain in the background. (2012)

- Location within San Francisco Bay Area Location within California Location within the United States
- Type: San Mateo County Parks District
- Location: 95 Harbormaster Rd. South San Francisco, California 94080
- Coordinates: 37.663066°N 122.380743°W
- Area: 33 acres (13 ha)
- Status: Open all year
- Website: www.smharbor.com/oysterpoint/

Oyster Point Marina/Park is a 408-berth public marina and 33-acre (13 ha) park located in the city of South San Francisco, California on the western shoreline of San Francisco Bay.

The City of South San Francisco owns Oyster Point Marina/Park. The San Mateo County Harbor District has operated Oyster Point Marina/Park under a Joint Powers Agreement (JPA) with the City since 1977. The JPA terminates in 2026.

The marina is located close to nearby job centers in various office complexes and high rises in downtown of this city known as a regional biotech center. It includes a fuel dock, boat launching ramp, and fishing pier. In addition to boating and parkland, there are hiking and jogging trails, picnic areas, and 2.5 acres (1.0 ha) of sandy beaches.

== Oyster Point Landfill ==
The Oyster Point Landfill is a closed, unlined Class III landfill that was in operation from 1956 to 1970. Prior to 1956, what would become the Oyster Point Landfill area consisted of tidal marshlands and upland soils and bedrock.

Between 1956 and 1970, the City of South San Francisco leased the site (approximately 57 acres (23 ha)) to the now defunct landfill operator The South San Francisco Scavenger Company.

In 1956, Scavenger began disposal operations at the landfill. Initially, municipal solid waste was disposed of on the ground and burned. This activity ended in 1957 following the enactment of laws prohibiting open air burning of rubbish in the Bay Area. To address the new air quality restrictions South City and Scavenger established a solid waste disposal site on the submerged lands just east of the original Oyster Point.

The landfill was developed in three phases. Filling of the first section began in 1957 and was completed by late 1961. The first area to be filled extended into the Bay about 1,500 feet (460 m) eastward from the original bluff. Scavenger placed waste directly into the tidelands and used a wire fence to control the discharge of solids into the Bay due to tidal action. Waste disposal operations eventually resulted in the relocation of the shoreline approximately 3,000 feet (910 m) to the east of the pre-landfill shoreline.

The landfill material is as deep as 45 feet (14 m), consisting of poorly compacted municipal and industrial waste. Typical waste found within the landfill includes the following: chemicals, drums, paper, cardboard, organic matter, wood, glass, metal, rubber, rocks, concrete, and other materials. The base of the landfill material has been compressed into, and mixed with, the upper part of the Bay Mud. The volume of waste in the landfill is approximately 2,500,000 cubic yards (1,900,000 m^{3}) and total weight of this material is approximately 1,400,000 short tons (1,300,000 t). This volume of waste would cover a football field almost to the height of the Empire State Building.

Beginning in 1961, the landfill received liquid industrial waste for disposal. The types of liquid waste included paints, thinners, and coagulated solvent sludge. The liquid wastes were placed in a sump (Sump 1). No records describing the construction of the sump have been found. Liquid industrial wastes were disposed of in this sump from 1961 until 1966. In July 1966, the City of South San Francisco discontinued the use of Sump 1 and used Sump 2 until 1967. The total volume of liquid industrial waste received by the landfill in 1965 and 1966 is estimated at 608,351 and 378,680 US gallons (2,302,860 and 1,433,460 L; 506,558 and 315,317 imp gal), respectively. Sump 1 alone is almost enough to fill an Olympic-size swimming pool.

Consistent with landfill practices at that time, no liner was installed at the site. Waste disposal design features such as liners, cellular division of waste, and leachate collection systems were not installed. Instead, the waste materials were placed directly onto the Bay Mud and soils overlying bedrock. In order to contain the solid waste from contact with waters of the State, Bay Mud berms were constructed around portions of the waste disposal areas in 1961, 1962, and 1964. However, there is no data to suggest that the industrial waste sumps were ever constructed with additional berms or dikes to control the migration of liquid wastes.

In 1962, a small craft harbor was constructed along the north shore of the landfill. To create a breakwater for the east side of the marina, the second phase of landfill was placed in the form of a mole extending from the eastern end of the first fill and north about 400 feet into the Bay. The third phase of filling began in 1964 and was accomplished by dredging up Bay Mud and forming mud dikes and a dike-enclosed cell in which solid waste was later placed.

== Current status ==
Upon completion of the disposal operations, various landfill closure activities took place through the late 1980s. The closed landfill then became the site for development of the Oyster Point Marina/Park.

As of 2024 the landfill is owned by the City of South San Francisco and is operated as a marina, ferry terminal, yacht club, hotel, office space, and open space. South City is responsible for landfill maintenance and the San Mateo County Harbor District manages marina operations pursuant to a Joint Powers Agreement that terminates in 2026.

=== Proposed redevelopment ===
South City hopes to redevelop the site. The 2015 Semiannual Oyster Point Landfill Report states that a project would include excavation of landfill materials at the former Oyster Point Landfill and relocation of these materials on- and/or off-site. The landfill cap would be upgraded to meet the current requirements of Title 27 of the California Code of Regulations with the approval of the Regional Water Quality Control Board and San Mateo County Environmental Health Division.

The first phase of redevelopment plans call for up to 600,000 square feet of office/R&D space, envisioned as a biotech campus, and possibly a retail/restaurant building, in the area currently occupied by the existing commercial development at the eastern side of the landfill site. Phase I also includes the reconfiguration of Marina Boulevard and a portion of Oyster Point Boulevard, and a shuttle turn-around will be constructed adjacent to the Ferry Terminal. Parcels to the east of the new development will be graded and improved as sports fields. Further east a future hotel and retail complex is envisioned. The existing Yacht Club structure and the Harbor District maintenance building would remain.

The landfill is regulated by the San Mateo County Division of Environmental Health, the San Francisco Regional Water Quality Control Board, and the Bay Area Air Quality Management District.

On Dec. 9, 2015, Bruce H. Wolfe, Executive Officer of the San Francisco Bay Regional Water Quality Control Board sent the City of South San Francisco an enforcement letter regarding recurrent flooding overtopping the landfill cap.

In October 2019, online payment processing company Stripe signed a lease for 421,000 square foot of office space in the redeveloped Oyster Point - thus becoming South San Francisco's largest tenant - and announced it would be moving its headquarters from neighboring San Francisco there in 2021.

=== WETA South San Francisco Ferry ===
Increasingly congested traffic on Highway 101 and the proximity of job centers (including Genentech) near this marina led the San Francisco Bay Water Transit Authority to develop a ferry terminal here. During the planning phases it was proposed that the terminal operate service to downtown San Francisco as well as Bay Farm Island in Alameda on the opposite shore. Service was to begin in 2011.

Two docks were removed for the new ferry terminal, built on pilings and floats, and the Army Corps of Engineers set up breakwaters in order to allow safe ferry operations.

The San Francisco Bay Ferry began operating an afternoon commute hour ferry service between the South San Francisco Ferry Terminal at the Oyster Point Marina and the Oakland Ferry Terminal at Jack London Square in Oakland, continuing on to the Main Street ferry terminal in Alameda in June 2012. San Francisco Bay Ferry added service between South San Francisco and the San Francisco Ferry Building in April 2013, providing one trip north in the morning and one trip south in the afternoon.
