= WTA =

WTA may refer to:

== Organizations ==
- Washington Trails Association
- Waskahegan Trail Association, the management board for the Waskahegan Trail
- Water Transit Authority, former name of the San Francisco Bay Area Water Emergency Transportation Authority
- Whatcom Transportation Authority, a bus agency in Washington State, USA
- Wichita Terminal Association, a railroad
- Wisconsin Towns Association
- Women's Tennis Association
- World Transhumanist Association, former name of Humanity+

== Other uses ==
- Wall teichoic acid, teichoic acids that are covalently bound to peptidoglycan in bacteria
- Warcop Training Area, a UK Ministry of Defence military training area, Cumbria, North West England
- Weapon target assignment problem
- Willingness to accept
- Winner takes all (disambiguation)
