= Richmond Ferry Terminal =

Ferry terminal in California, United States

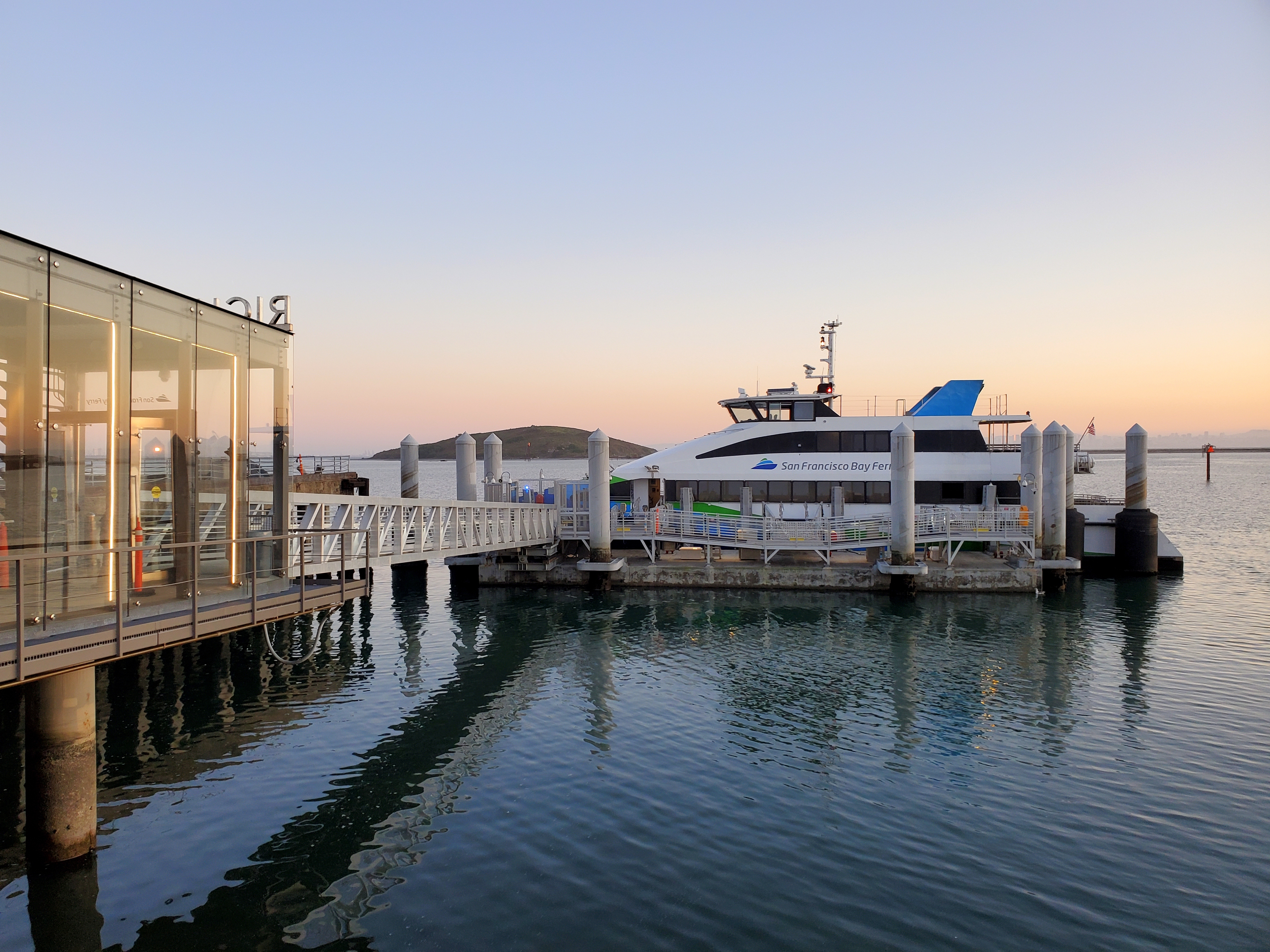
- The Gemini docked at Richmond Ferry Terminal in March 2021

General information
- Location: Harbor Way South; Richmond, California
- Coordinates: 37°54′33″N 122°21′34″W
- Operator: San Francisco Bay Ferry
- Connections: AC Transit route 74; City of Richmond shuttle

Construction
- Parking: 362 spaces
- Cycle facilities: 20 lockers
- Accessible: Yes

History
- Opened: 1999; Reopened January 10, 2019
- Closed: c. 2000

Passengers
- 14,000 a month
Location

Richmond Ferry Terminal (historically Ellis Landing) is a ferry terminal located in the Marina Bay neighborhood of Richmond, California. It provides daily commuter service to San Francisco.

== History ==
The terminal is located at Ford Point on the Richmond Inner Harbor which opens in to San Francisco Bay. Ford Point derives its name from the historic Ford Plant that is located adjacent and has been converted to an industrial park and event space.

The location was originally called Ellis Landing, which was a shipping port since 1849. Schooners transported agricultural products from Contra Costa to San Francisco from that port, and brought back supplies for "mining districts up the river."

=== Red and White fleet service ===
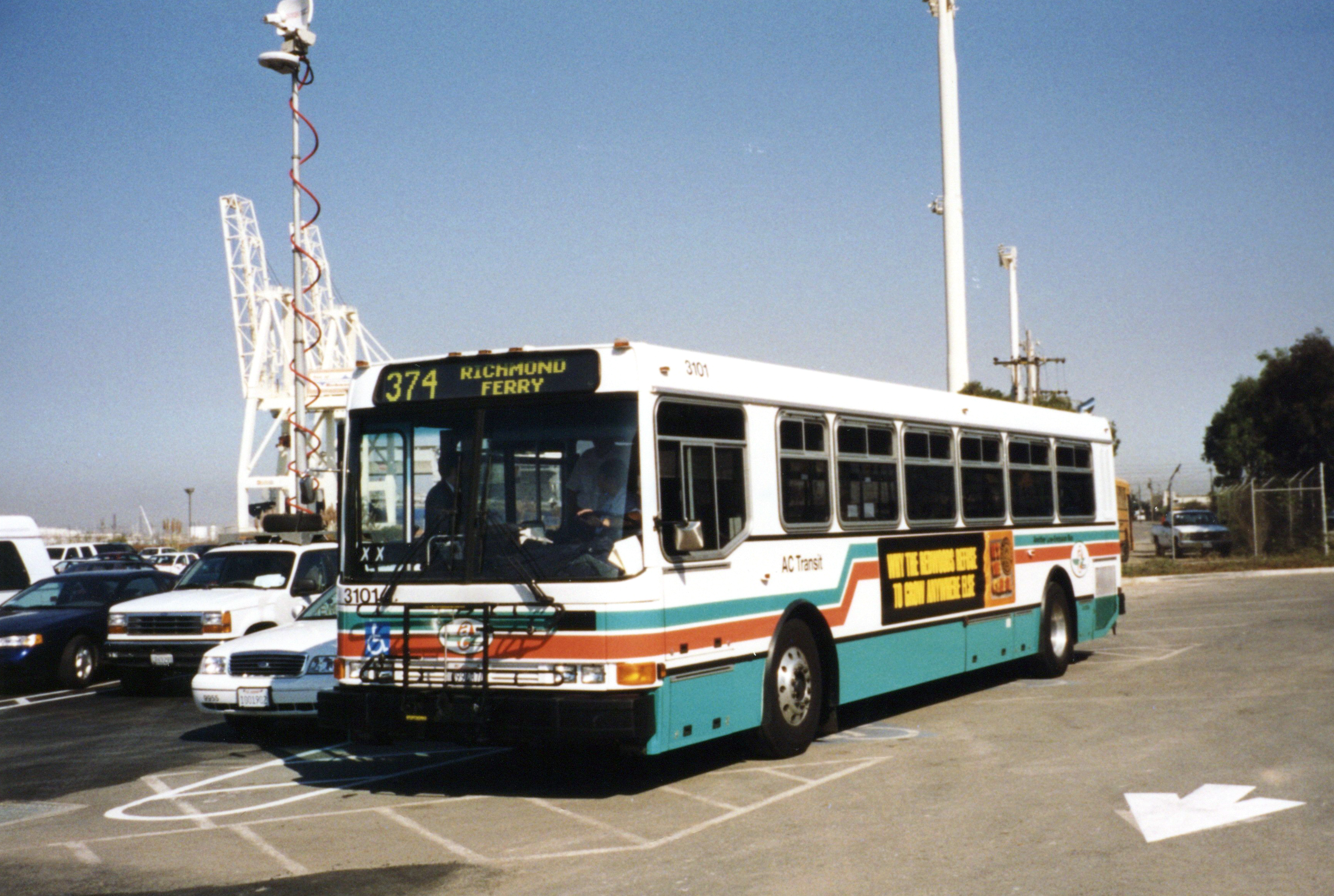
AC Transit route 374 bus at the terminal

The terminal hosted a commuter ferry service to the San Francisco Ferry Building weekdays and Fisherman's Wharf on weekends in addition to special AT&T Park service during the baseball season with a voyage taking approximately 45 minutes one-way. The service began in 1999, but was discontinued in the late 2000s in the economic downturn following the dot-com bust. Ferry ridership plummeted and the service became economically unsustainable, which led Red and White Fleet to discontinue the service. Ridership was 45 per trip while about 200 were needed for fiscal sustainability.

The terminal had its own dedicated AC Transit feeder service from Point Richmond and downtown Richmond with route 374 also now discontinued.

=== San Francisco Bay Ferry planning ===
In 2007 most of the Richmond City Council except Tom Butt and Mayor Gayle McLaughlin had lost interest in the project, instead supporting using the site for expanded Toyota vehicle importation parking, in which said company has expressed an interest.

The impetus for the reinstated ferry service continued in 2008 when the powers behind planning the project determined that there needed to be 750 "rooftops" within a half mile of the terminal site to generate significant and sustainable ridership figures. Senator Don Perata has secured 2 million dollars in monies from California State Proposition 1B for studies of several ferry proposals including new Richmond-San Francisco service; the Richmond study is planned to commence in the summer of 2008.

In 2012 WETA rebranded as the San Francisco Bay Ferry began operation of its first new ferry run, the South San Francisco Ferry and as such began exploring opportunities for additional new services was launched. Planning meetings were held to reopen and remodel the terminal at the Craneway Pavilion in Richmond's Marina Bay. A public comment period found that there were concerns for walking distance between ferry and parking and also bicycle parking. An environmental review was ordered to last up to nine months. Funding was approved in 2015, with service then expected to begin in 2018.

In April 2016, the San Francisco Ferry building secured a $4 million federal grant. The funds were used for construction of new berths beginning in 2017 Tideline started offering a private 35 minute US$11 one-way service to the San Francisco Ferry Building from a separate pier in the Marina Bay District in 2017, but discontinued it several years later.

=== San Francisco Bay Ferry service ===
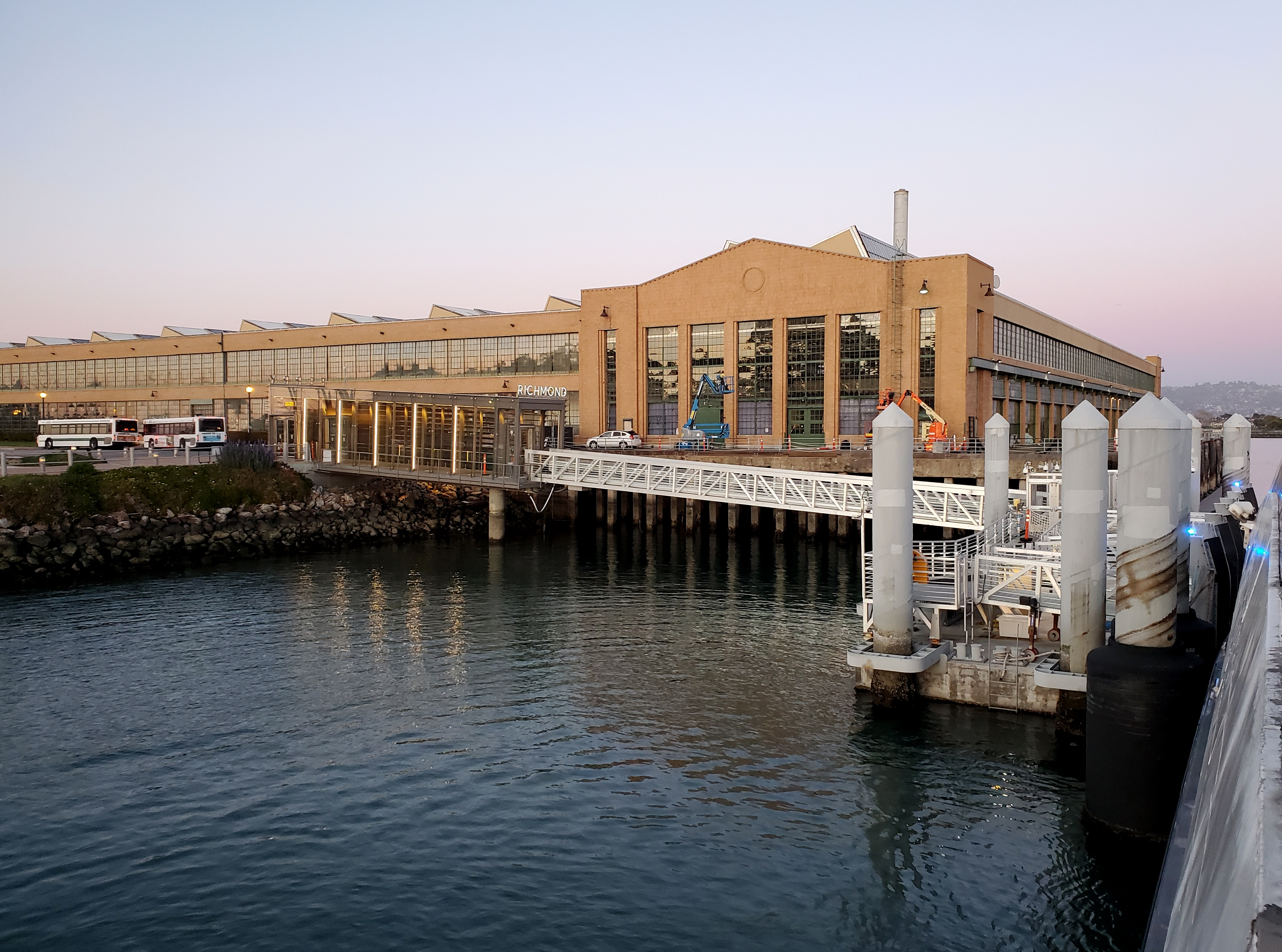
The terminal seen from a ferry in 2021

On January 10, 2019, after delays, the San Francisco Bay Ferry launched its service from this terminal. The journey to the San Francisco Ferry Building takes approximately 35 minutes. The regular fare is $US 6.75 with free parking compared with BART trains from the nearby El Cerrito Plaza station for $7.50 plus an additional $4 for parking to downtown San Francisco. Passengers stated to the media that they felt "safer" using the ferry compared to BART. While mayor Tom Butt stated that he felt the new ferry system was positive with regards to development in the city.

The service provides an alternative to what is dubbed as one of the "worst" commutes in the region (Interstate 80). The ferry service was initially project to carry an estimated 400 passengers daily increasing to a peak of up to 1,800 when fully developed. Weekend service is planned to support visitors to the adjacent Craneway Pavilion and the nearby Rosie the Riveter/World War II Home Front National Historical Park. 35 million dollars in Regional Measure 3 funds are earmarked for the expanded service however court challenges to the $3 Bay Area bridge toll increase have tied up the funds. Although mayor Butt believed the terminal would help development city councilmember Eduardo Martinez quipped that there should be affordable housing included in one of the Bay Area's last "bastions of affordability". Currently four ferries depart each weekday morning starting at 6:10 am and continuing until 8:40 am. Return trips from San Francisco run from 4:30 pm to 6:50 pm. There are also two reverse commute trips going both ways. Fares are $9 one-way however if paying with a contactless Clipper card the charge is $6.75 moreover youth, seniors, and disabled passengers paid $4.50 with children 5 and under riding free as of January 4, 2019. Passengers riding to the terminal on AC Transit's route 74, a 10-minute ride from the downtown Richmond station, receive a $2.25 discount on their fare. Bike lockers and bike racks have been installed at the terminal as well. New condos were built near the ferry and the developer cited the proximity to it for their development. Melvin Willis one of Richmond's rotating vice mayors stated there should be "vigilance" regarding the project in not pricing people out nor raising rents and causing gentrification. Betty Reid Soskin a park ranger at the national monument however stated she hoped it would be a boost for business in the area and lead to the terminal becoming the East Bay's gateway to Alcatraz.

By June 2019, six months into the service it met its ridership goals six years early with 740 boardings a day with projected ridership of 480 that early on.

Weekend service will begin in August 2019 according to mayor Butt. The service will be on a three-month trial basis with regular fares and departure times as early as 9:30 am from Richmond and returning service as late as 8:20 pm from San Francisco with 5 trips each way spread out more or less evenly throughout the day. The trial will begin August 3 and last through the first week of November.
