= MV Sea Change =

World's first commercial fuel cell ferry

MV Sea Change is the first hydrogen fuel cell vessel in the United States and the first commercial fuel cell ferry in the world.

== Background ==
The ferry's development and construction served as a model for how marine hydrogen fuel cell technology with zero emissions may be commercialised. The development of the project began in 2018 and the ferry was delivered in August 2021. San Francisco Bay Ferry, which runs 16 vessels to Californian communities like Oakland, Richmond, and Vallejo, will run the ferry. To expedite the decarbonization and energy transition of the US maritime industry, the first fleet of entirely zero-carbon marine vessels is being built using private financing from SWITCH, an impact investing platform. Zero Emission Industries (previously Golden Gate Zero Emission Marine) supplied the hydrogen fuel cell power package for the vessel, which consists of 246 kg of Hexagon hydrogen storage tanks and 360 kW of Cummins fuel cells. Two 300 kW electric propulsion systems from BAE Systems and a 100 kWh lithium-ion battery from XALT are combined into this system. With zero emissions and reduced maintenance, the hydrogen fuel cell powertrain system offers the same operational flexibility as diesel. The ferry generates electricity from hydrogen fuel cells to run electric motors for up to 300 nautical miles at a speed of 15 knots. Other advantages include extremely little vibration and noise and no exhaust smoke. With the exception of pure water vapour emissions, this technology enables future ferries to function on par with diesel-powered ships without requiring the installation of substantial onshore battery charging infrastructure. The Hornblower Group is in charge of managing and supervising the construction, while Incat Crowther is the source of the vessel design.

A $3 million grant from the California Air Resources Board (CARB), which is managed by the Bay Area Air Quality Management District (BAAQMD), is one of the major municipal supports for this project. The initiative is part of California Climate Investments, a statewide programme that uses billions of Cap-and-Trade dollars to reduce greenhouse gas emissions, boost the state's economy, and enhance public health and the environment, especially in underprivileged areas. Furthermore, the project was granted the first-ever loan guarantee under the Climate Tech Finance programme of BAAQMD, which aims to accelerate the development of innovative climate technologies in order to reduce greenhouse gas emissions. The Climate Tech Finance team undertook a technology qualifying and greenhouse gas study in collaboration with the California Infrastructure Economic Development Bank and the Northern California Financial Development Corporation (NorCal FDC), which determined that SWITCH qualified for a loan guarantee. With the help of this loan guarantee, SWITCH was able to get a $5 million construction and term loan from KeyBank, allowing it to finish this project.
