= Winner takes all =

Winner(s) take(s) (it) all may refer to:

== Competition, economics and politics ==
- Winner-takes-all voting
- Winner-take-all (computing)
- Winner-take-all market

== Books ==
=== Fiction ===
- Winner Takes All (novel), a BBC Books Doctor Who novel
- "Winner Take All" (short story), a Sailor Steve Costigan story by Robert E. Howard

=== Nonfiction ===
- Winner-Take-All Politics, by Jacob S. Hacker and Paul Pierson
- The Winner-Take-All Society, by economist Robert Frank
- Winners Take All: The Elite Charade of Changing the World by Anand Giridharadas
- Winner Takes All (Binkley book) by Christina Binkley

== Film ==
- Winner Takes All (1918 film), directed by Elmer Clifton
- Winner Take All (1924 film), directed by W. S. Van Dyke
- Winner Take All (1932 film), starring James Cagney
- Winner Take All (1939 film), starring Tony Martin
- Joe Palooka in Winner Take All
- Winner Take All, a 1975 made-for-TV film starring Shirley Jones and Laurence Luckinbill
- Winner Takes All (1982 film), directed by Wong Jing
- Winners Take All (film), a 1987 film directed by Fritz Kiersch
- Winner Takes All (2000 film), directed by Clifton Ko
- Winner Takes All (2004 film), short film directed by Helen M. Grace

== Television ==
- Winner Takes All (game show), on the ITV network from 1975 to 1988, and on Challenge TV from 1997
- Winner Take All (game show), a 1940s and early '50s American game show
- "Winners Take All", the tenth episode of the fifth season of the sitcom Murphy Brown
- "Winner Take All", the ninth episode of the second season of Teen Titans

== Music ==
- Winner Take All, 1998, by The Turbo A.C.'s
- Winner Takes All (album), 1979, by The Isley Brothers
- "The Winner Takes It All", 1980, by ABBA
- "Winner Takes It All" (Sammy Hagar song), 1987, from the film Over the Top
- Winners Take All (album) by Quiet Riot
- "Winners Take All", a song from the Quiet Riot album Condition Critical
- "Winners Take All", a song from the Aesop Rock EP Fast Cars, Danger, Fire and Knives

== See also ==
- Kill the Winner hypothesis alternative to "Winner takes all" for population growth in microbes
