= Marina Bay, Richmond, California =

Marina Bay
- Neighborhood of Richmond
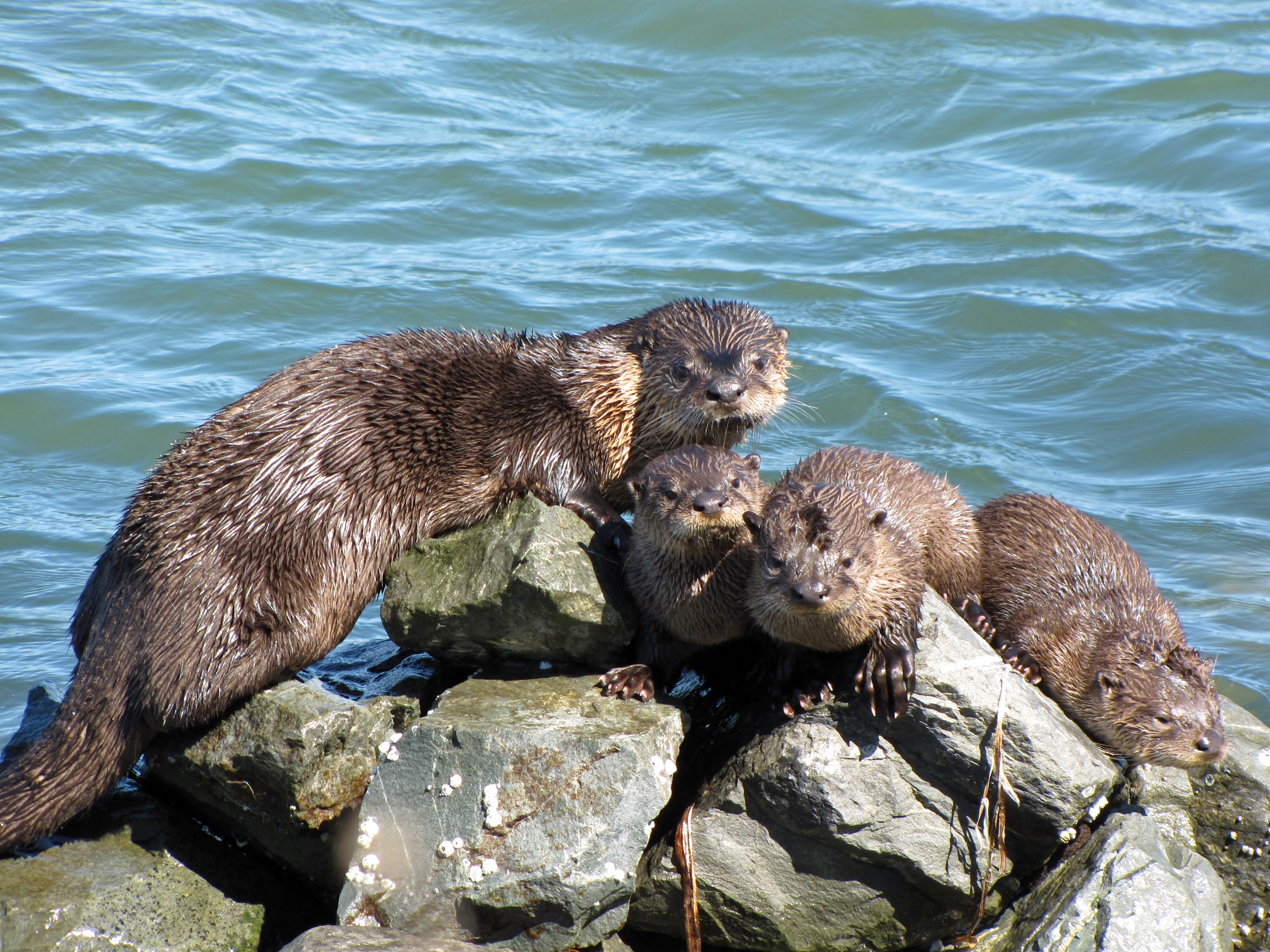
- Otters on the riprap at the Richmond Marina in Marina Bay
- Interactive map of Marina Bay
- Coordinates: 37.9128°N 122.3465°W
- Country: United States
- State: California
- County: Contra Costa

Government
  - Mayor: Tom Butt
  - Senate: Mark DeSaulnier (D); Loni Hancock (D)
  - Assembly: Nancy Skinner (D)
  - U. S. Congress: Nancy Pelosi (D)

Area
  - Total: 0.551 sq mi (1.43 km^{2})
  - Land: 0.551 sq mi (1.43 km^{2})

Population (2008)
  - Total: 3,034
  - Density: 5,510/sq mi (2,130/km^{2})
- ZIP Code: 94804
- Area codes: 510, 341
- BART Stations: Richmond, El Cerrito
- AC Transit Bus routes: 74
- Website: http://www.ci.richmond.ca.us/

"D Dock", one of four docking sections in Richmond Marina Bay Yacht Harbor

Rosie the Riveter monument in Marina Bay

Marina Bay, is located in Richmond's protected Richmond Inner Harbor. It was developed in the mid-1980s in an effort to clean up what had been up to that point the defunct World War II-era Kaiser Shipyards.

Marina Bay was planned as an upscale residential waterfront community with apartments, condominiums, townhouses, and houses. The area is also home to many retail and light-industry businesses. The City of Richmond wants to attract more research and development into the area. The city considers it one of its success stories and uses it as a template for other projects.

== Points of Interest ==
=== Marina Bay Yacht Harbor ===
The area hosts an 850-berth marina. Marina Bay Yacht Harbor is also known as Richmond Marina Bay and was built by the City of Richmond in the early 1980s. The berths are divided into four sections along the north shore: D-Dock, E-Dock, F-Dock & G-Dock (from east to west). Berth sizes range from 26' long to 61' long with several end-ties available up to 100' long. A launch ramp is available in the northwest corner of the marina.

The marina Entrance Channel (also known as the Ford Channel after the Ford Plant along its northern shore) was dredged to -12' mean lower low water in the Fall of 2011. The marina basin itself is 12' to 18' deep at MLLW, a legacy of the time when the basin was Shipyard #2 and used to construct Liberty Ships during World War II.

=== San Francisco Bay Trail ===
The San Francisco Bay Trail runs through the neighborhood from Point Isabel and currently ends here, although it is planned to be connected to Point Richmond and also downtown to the Richmond Greenway.

=== Rosie the Riveter monument ===
Dedicated on October 14, 2000, the area hosts the Rosie the Riveter/World War II Home Front National Historical Park to honor the contributions of the American women labor force during World War II. The area the monument stands in was once known as Kaiser Shipyard #2 where women worked alongside men to construct military transport and cargo ships. The monument is a straight pathway containing inscriptions and photographs depicting that era. The length of the path is approximately the length of a Liberty Ship's keel and contains three sculptures to abstractly represent the ship's bow, steam stack, and stern.

=== Craneway Pavilion ===
The former Ford Motor Company Assembly Plant has been transformed into a mixed-use complex that houses light-industry, a restaurant/bar, and a popular event venue.

=== Sister city monument ===
Shimada Friendship park is a monument to Shimada, Japan which is one of Richmond's sister cities.

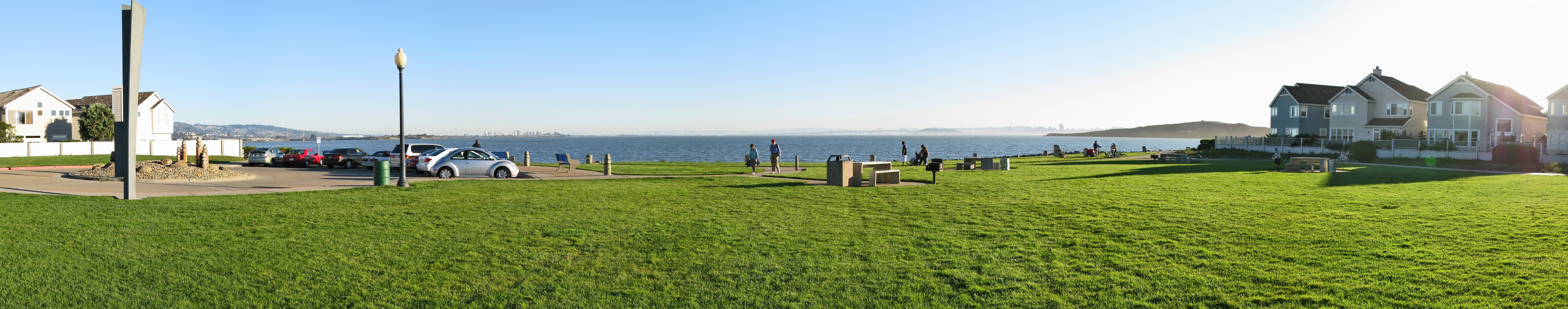
Marina Bay's Shimada Friendship Park provides a panoramic view from its northern location in San Francisco Bay. Prominent landmarks (left to right) include the Berkeley Hills, downtown Oakland, the Port of Oakland, the Bay Bridge, Yerba Buena Island, San Francisco, and Brooks Island.

=== Ferry terminal ===
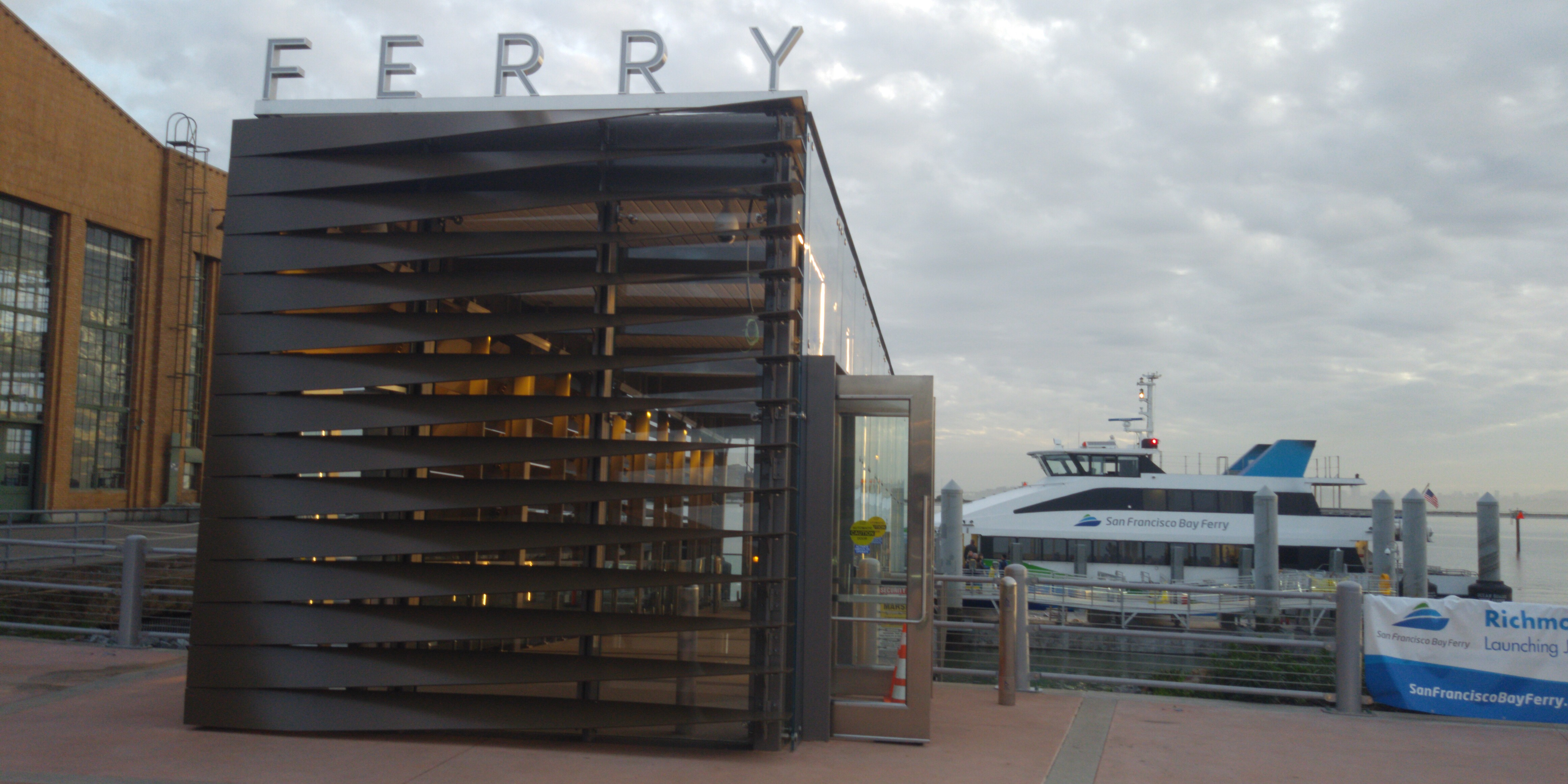
Richmond Ferry Terminal

In 2016 the area was served by a private water taxi service departing from the Harbormaster Dock and arriving approximately 35 minutes later next to the San Francisco Ferry Building. Services included twice daily evening runs during commute hours. In 2019 the Richmond Ferry Terminal reopened here after being closed since 2000, with service to San Francisco.
