= South San Francisco Ferry Terminal =

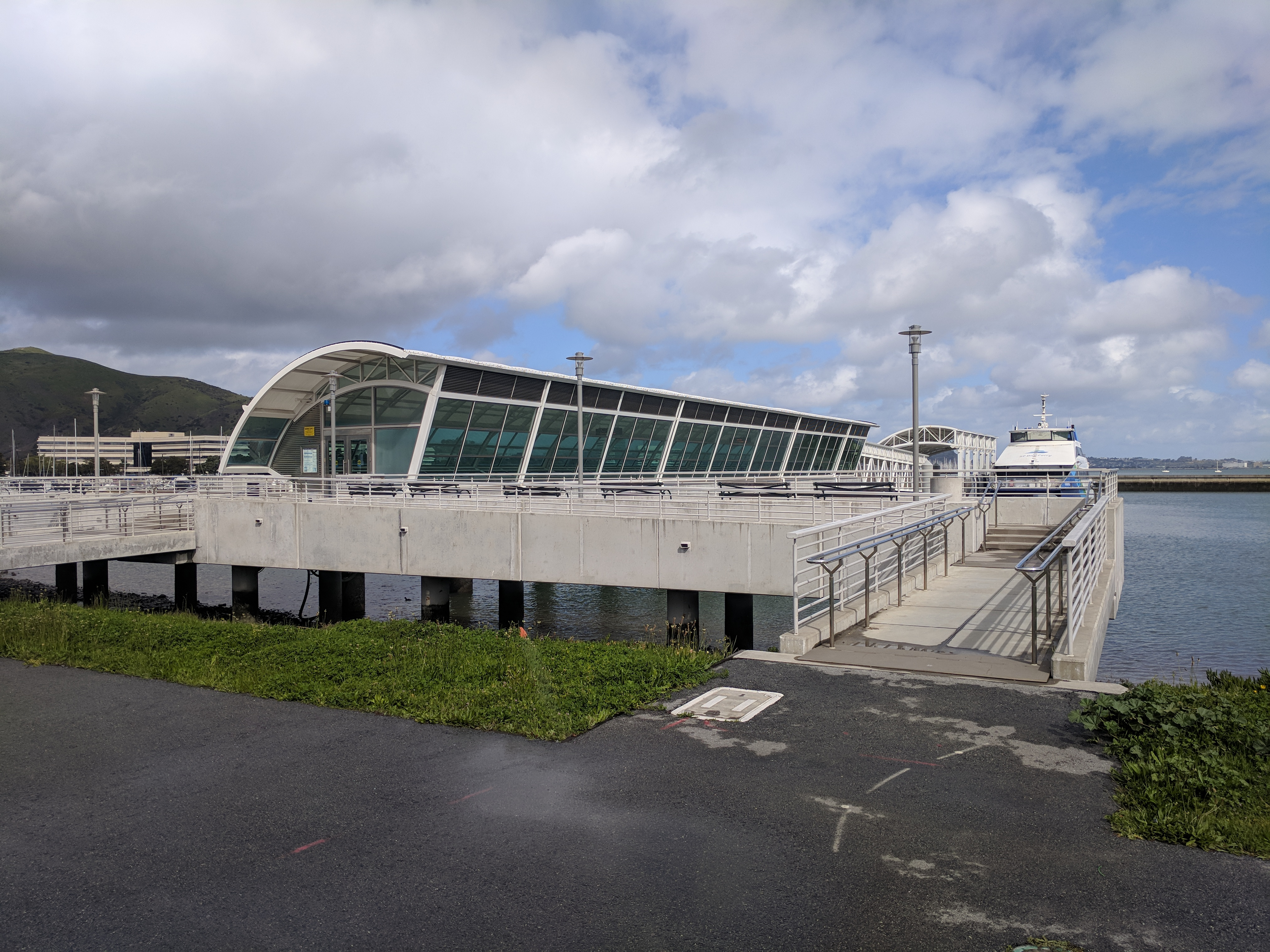

General information
- Location: 911 Marina Blvd; South San Francisco, California 94080
- Coordinates: 37.662694°N 122.377271°W

Construction
- Parking: 35 spaces
- Cycle facilities: 12 lockers; 12 spaces in racks

History
- Opened: June 4, 2012
Location

The South San Francisco Ferry Terminal is the only operating ferry terminal in San Mateo County, California. Boats are operated there by the San Francisco Bay Ferry company, and connect the city of South San Francisco to the Oakland Ferry Terminal in Jack London Square as well as Alameda, California.

Construction began in 2009 and the ferry service started on June 4, 2012. While a ferry service between San Francisco and ports to the south existed as far south as San Jose and Alviso during the 1800s, most passengers to Peninsula destinations took the San Francisco and San Jose Railroad after it was completed in 1864 as part of the transcontinental railway.

== Design and construction ==
The new ferry terminal is the first ferry terminal built south of San Francisco for many years. The Oyster Point Marina land is owned by the City of South San Francisco (SSF). The San Mateo County Harbor District operates the land under a Joint Powers Agreement with the City of SSF.

A 1992 report stated that ferry service between SSF and San Francisco (Ferry Building) or San Leandro would not be feasible, based on low projected ridership and inadequate farebox recovery ratios. It was noted that neither city had a strong history of transit ridership as ridership was low; 155 passengers per day for the ride to San Francisco, and 50 to 150 passengers per day between SSF and San Leandro.

The ferry terminal was built at a cost of US$26,000,000 (equivalent to $36,460,000 in 2025) in 2012, raised through an increase in San Mateo County sales taxes; an additional US$16,000,000 (equivalent to $22,440,000 in 2025) from increased bridge tolls paid for two new ferries.

The two ferries operated are the twin-hull catamarans Gemini and Pisces, dubbed the "nation's most environmentally-friendly ferries," each equipped with low-emissions diesel engines and featuring space for 149 passengers, 34 bicycles, on-board Wi-Fi, and solar panels. The ferries measure 116 feet (35 m) long and can cruise at 25 knots (46 km/h; 29 mph).

== Operation ==
Average Daily Boardings
| Year | Jan | July | Avg (Note: Average computed for the operating year, July–June. First full operating year was July 2012 through June 2013.) |
|---|---|---|---|
| 2012 | N/A | 141 | N/A |
| 2013 | 118 | 366 | 161 |
| 2014 | 307 | 365 | 333 |
| 2015 | 445 | 463 | 422 |
| 2016 | 483 | 496 | 479 |
| 2017 | 437 | 576 | 514 |
| 2018 | 575 | — | 552 (Note: Through Feb 2018) |

=== Connections ===
The nearest freeway connection is the Oyster Point Boulevard exit from Highway 101. There is on-site parking for 35 vehicles and 24 bicycles.

The ferry terminal is approximately 2 miles (3.2 km) from the nearest public transportation, at the South San Francisco Caltrain commuter rail station. A free shuttle bus, sponsored by local employers but open to the public, connects the South San Francisco Ferry Terminal, Oyster Point area office buildings, and the South San Francisco Caltrain station during weekday commute hours.

=== Ridership ===
The farebox recovery ratio was 17% at the end of 2013, and the service was in danger of not meeting the required 40% recovery ratio by the end of the 2014–15 fiscal year on June 30, 2015. As of 2017, the farebox recovery ratio had increased to 38%.

=== Routes ===
Service was first offered to Alameda, Oakland on the weekdays starting in 2012.

One round trip per day is scheduled to the San Francisco Ferry Building (next to the south side of Ferry Building - Gate E) and Pier 41 on Wednesday and Fridays effective April 29, 2013. Return times are approximately 30 minutes from SSF to SF Ferry Building, but these differ by the day of the week.
