= Chico Slimani =

British singer (born 1971)

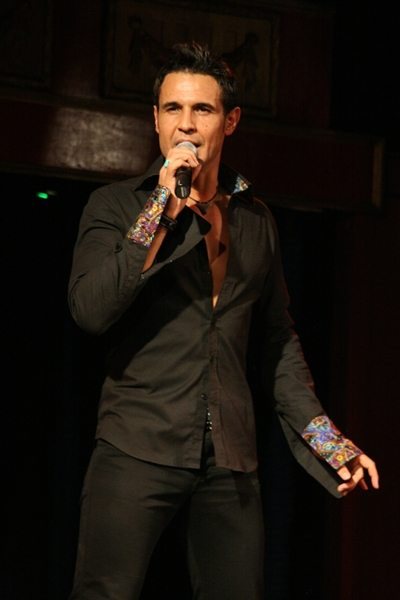
- Slimani in 2007

Background information
- Also known as: Chico
- Born: Yousseph Slimani; 1971 (age 54–55); Bridgend, Wales, United Kingdom
- Genres: Pop, Latin
- Occupations: Singer; actor
- Instrument: Vocals
- Years active: 2005–present
- Label: Sony BMG

Yousseph "Chico" Slimani (born 1971) is a British singer and actor from Bridgend, Wales, who rose to prominence after reaching the quarter-finals of the second series of the ITV talent show The X Factor in 2005, from which he was the seventh contestant eliminated. In 2006, his debut single "It's Chico Time" topped the UK Singles Chart. In 2008, he appeared on the reality TV show CelebAir, where he placed third.

== Early life ==
Yousseph Slimani was born in Bridgend to a Moroccan father and Welsh mother. He moved to live in Morocco from the age of two, when his father took him to live on the family farm. He returned to the United Kingdom with his father at the age of 14. After leaving school, he trained on the Youth Training Scheme as an electrical engineer.

Aspiring to have a career in arts and entertainment, Slimani took part in an exotic dance troupe called "Extreme Force" and later became a singer/compere with Lapattack. He also worked as a stripper for a while. From a young age, he continued writing and recording songs. In 2004, Slimani worked as an actor and co-wrote, starred, produced and provided the soundtrack for the BAFTA nominated short film Winner Takes All alongside actor JC Mac.

== Career ==
=== The X Factor and singing career ===
Judge Simon Cowell walked out of Slimani's initial X Factor audition after fellow judges Louis Walsh and Sharon Osbourne voted him through to the second round after he performed "If I Ever Fall in Love" (from Shai) / "Kiss" (from Prince and the Revolution).

His category ("Over 25s") was mentored by Osbourne, who put him through to the live television phase after a particularly memorable performance at the Osbournes' "home", in which he jumped into a shallow pool and danced in the water (still holding a live microphone).

Slimani was at first mocked in the press, but after changing the style of his performances to become slightly more self-mocking, he began to win voters over. He also became the first contestant in a Simon Cowell show (Pop Idol, American Idol, The X Factor) to sing an original song (co-written with X Factor vocal coach Mark Hudson), the camp and iconic "It's Chico Time", named after his catchphrase (Chico: "What time is it?"; Audience: "It's Chico Time!")

Cowell was converted during the series, commenting that Slimani was a 'born entertainer', even if he was not the recording artist the show was looking to discover. In the quarter-final, Slimani was voted out of the competition, which was won by Shayne Ward in December 2005.

The performances by Slimani during X Factor included:

- Audition: "If I Ever Fall in Love" (from Shai) / "Kiss" (from Prince and the Revolution) (to Final 24)
- Judges House: "Livin' la Vida Loca" (from Ricky Martin) (to Final 12)
- Week 1: (15 October 2005): "Da Ya Think I'm Sexy?" (from Rod Stewart) (Bottom 2, saved 2–1)
- Week 2 (22 October 2005): "Play That Funky Music" (from Wild Cherry) (safe)
- Week 3 (29 October 2005): "Livin' la Vida Loca" (from Ricky Martin) (Bottom 2, saved 2–1)
- Week 4 (5 November 2005): "Kiss" (from Prince and the Revolution)
- Week 5 (12 November 2005): "Hero" (from Enrique Iglesias)
- Week 6 (19 November 2005): "It's Chico Time" by Chico Slimani (safe)
- Week 7 (26 November 2005): "Billie Jean" by Michael Jackson (Bottom 2, saved 2–1)
- Quarter-Final (3 December 2005): "I Got You (I Feel Good)" (from James Brown) and "Time Warp" (from The Rocky Horror Picture Show) (Eliminated after receiving fewest public votes)

Slimani had originally planned to release "It's Chico Time" as a single before Christmas 2005, but for contractual reasons, he had to wait. Slimani was quoted as saying, "I'm absolutely loving every minute of it, and looking forward to releasing the single at last". The single was eventually released in February 2006; it entered the UK Singles Chart at number one on 5 March 2006, toppling Madonna from the top spot. It remained at number one for two weeks. In early 2006, Slimani took part in the nationwide X Factor tour.

Slimani's follow-up single to his UK number one hit "It's Chico Time" was a cover of the song "D.I.S.C.O.", which entered the chart at number 24 in August 2006 on the UK Singles Chart. Slimani's single was an alternative version of the Ottawan hit with considerable changes in lyrics where Slimani sings: "C.H.I.C.O. on D.I.S.C.O.". He also amended the actual lyrics to "D dynamic // I incredible // S supersonic // C Chicolicious (alluding to his own name) // O oh, oh, oh".

His next single, "Curvy Cola Bottle Body", was released on 8 October 2007 and peaked at number 45 on the UK Singles Chart in its first week on the chart. X Factor judge Sharon Osbourne and her husband Ozzy Osbourne appeared in the official video. Proceeds went to the British Eating Disorders Association.

Since his X Factor appearance, Slimani has made many public appearances all over the UK. He toured at Butlins, performing full 45-minute sets along with a live band and dancers as part of The Chico Experience.

He also appeared in 2006 and on later occasions under his original name, Yousseph Slimani, in Muslim events singing Islamic songs, including "Moulana", a song he composed, dedicated to Muhammad and the Awliya' (the Men of God).

The Slimani songs "I Wanna Dance With U" and "You Take My Breath Away" were written by Roachie and produced by Danny Kirsch. "Good Day" Another Roachie / Kirsch production was used as part of the 2007 Butlins TV adverts.

The video for Slimani's fourth single, "Are You in It For Love", was premiered on his official website. It is a cover of a Ricky Martin hit. His debut album titled Lights, Camera, Action was released beginning of 2009.

In 2010, Slimani recorded a single in support of the England football team to the 2010 FIFA World Cup in South Africa. Aptly entitled "It's England Time", a play on "It's Chico Time", it uses the same tune of his previous No. 1 hit with amended lyrics. The song was first played on The Chris Moyles Show. Slimani recorded the single after having a 'vision' that England won the 2010 World Cup and that in the celebrations, commentators made reference to his Chico Time song. The music video was shot in Pinewood Studios and the official release date of the single was 7 June 2010. Proceeds went to Rainbow Child Foundation to help underprivileged children in Africa.

In December 2019, he appeared at the 15th anniversary of Ely's Christmas light switch event.

=== Television and acting career ===
- He has his own TV show in pre-production. 26 episodes are planned overall of the children show.
- He competed in ITV's 2012 series of Dancing on Ice, replacing Chesney Hawkes who had to withdraw due to an ankle injury, skating with Canadian bronze medallist Jodeyne Higgins. He competed in the finals coming 3rd.
- Slimani hosted via webcam an Online bingo session at Bingocams UK with the site giving 10% of the proceeds to his charity Rainbow Child Foundation

=== Film ===
Slimani is involved with a production company called Unity Films, and his daughter appeared in one of their short films, Left Holding Baby, for which Slimani composed the music. He also stars in the BAFTA-nominated 2004 short film Winner Takes All, along with his brother actor JC Mac. In 2005, he played a male stripper in Roberto Gomez Martin's Hell to Pay, a London underworld gangster film. In 2009, Slimani also appeared in 45, a psychological thriller boxing film, also alongside JC Mac.

== Personal life ==
Slimani is married to Daniyela Rakic-Slimani, sister of 2008 and 2009 Wimbledon Men's Doubles Champion Nenad Zimonjić. They have a daughter and a son.

=== Anti-vaccine protests ===
In 2020, Slimani spoke at anti-vaccination and anti-lockdown protests with Piers Corbyn.

=== Stroke ===
Slimani had a stroke on 21 September 2018 aged 47.

=== Charity work ===
On 20 May 2006, Slimani appeared on ITV's coverage of The Prince's Trust 30th Birthday Concert. He took part in a Blind Date-themed skit, being picked over Roger Moore and Richard E Grant by Dame Edna Everage.

Slimani founded the Rainbow Child Foundation with his wife Daniyela and JC Mac, and took part in a promotional video of the foundation to open an orphanage in Cambodia.

He took part in another Rainbow Child Foundation project in Malawi and South Africa with the charity One Water to see the work carried out installing Play Pumps. In 2011, Slimani visited Malawi and opened Play Pumps there.

Chico's single "Curvy Cola Bottle Body" is a protest against the "size zero" phenomenon. As part of its promotion, Chico teamed up with the British Eating Disorders Association (BEAT) charity. Profits from the single were donated to the charity.

Proceeds from Slimani's 2010 single "It's England Time" went to the Rainbow Child Foundation to help underprivileged children in Africa.

== Discography ==
=== Singles ===
Title	Year	Peak chart positions	
Title	Year	UK	IRE
"It's Chico Time"	2006	1	3
"D.I.S.C.O."	2006	24	39
"Curvy Cola Bottle Body Baby"	2007	45	—
"Are You in It for Love"	2007	—	—
"It's England Time"	2010	—	—
"—" denotes releases that did not chart or were not released in that territory.

== Music videos ==
Title	Year	Director(s)
"It's Chico Time"	2006	N/A
"D.I.S.C.O."	2006	N/A
"Curvy Cola Bottle Body Baby"	2007	N/A
"Are You in It For Love"	2007	N/A
"It's England Time"	2010	N/A

== Filmography ==
=== Actor ===
- 2004: Winner Takes All as Narrator
- 2005: Hell to Pay as stripper (Video)
- 2008: Ten Dead Men as himself
- 2009: 45 as Banks
- 2009: 31 North 62 East (also known as Too Close to the Truth (UK alternative title))

=== Composer ===
- 2004: Winner Takes All
- 2007: Left Holding Baby

=== Producer ===
- 2004: Winner Takes All (producer)
- 2007: Left Holding Baby (executive producer)
