= Blue & Gold Fleet =

Transport company in US

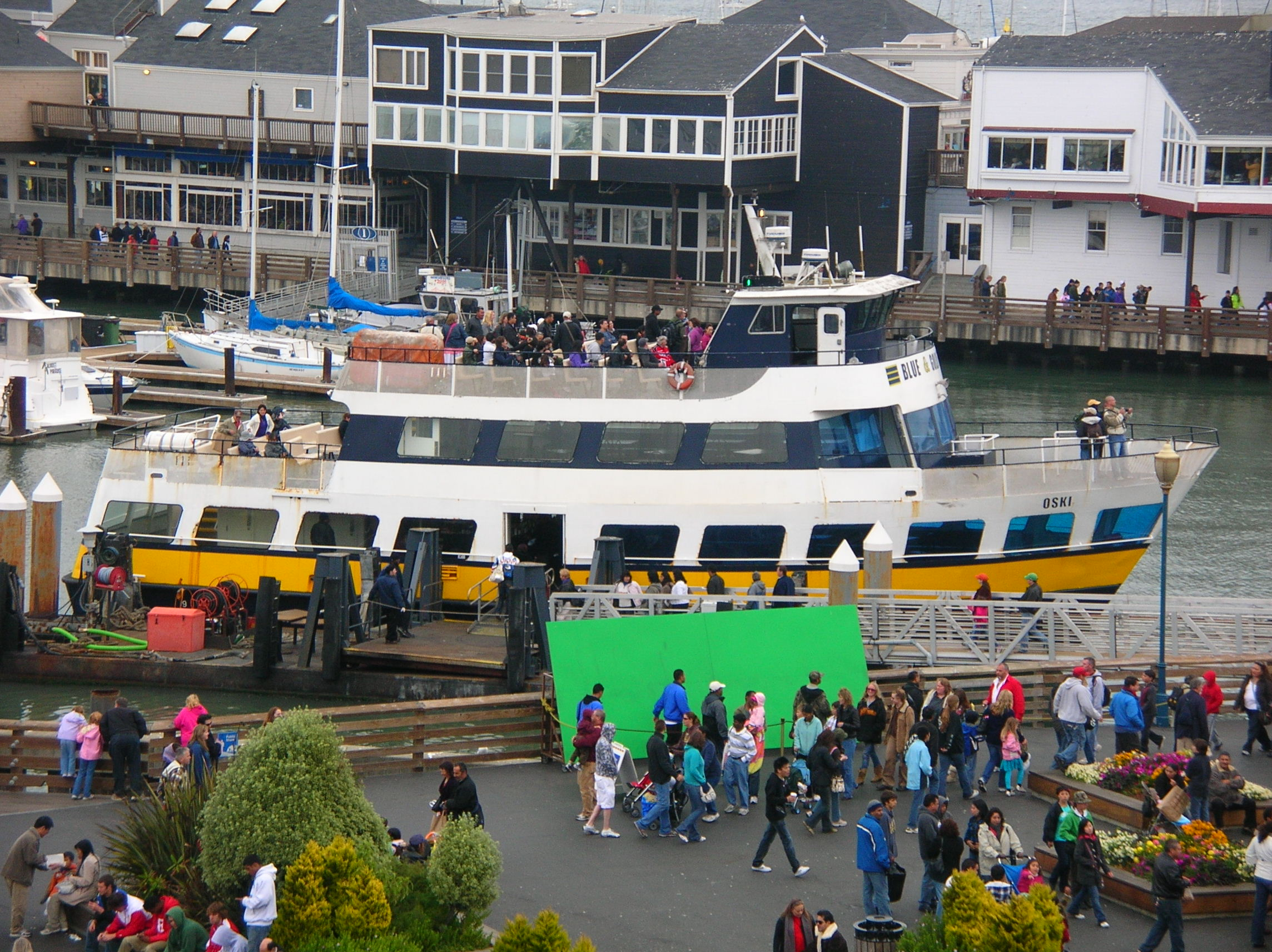
The ferry Oski at Pier 39 in October 2009.

Blue & Gold Fleet is a privately owned company in the United States providing ferry services in the San Francisco Bay Area of California. It operates the San Francisco Bay Ferry commuter ferry system under contract with San Francisco Bay Area Water Emergency Transportation Authority (WETA). Blue & Gold also operates tourist and excursion services under its own brand from Pier 41 in San Francisco. The company is the Bay Area's largest ferry transportation provider and carries approximately 4 million passengers annually.

== History ==
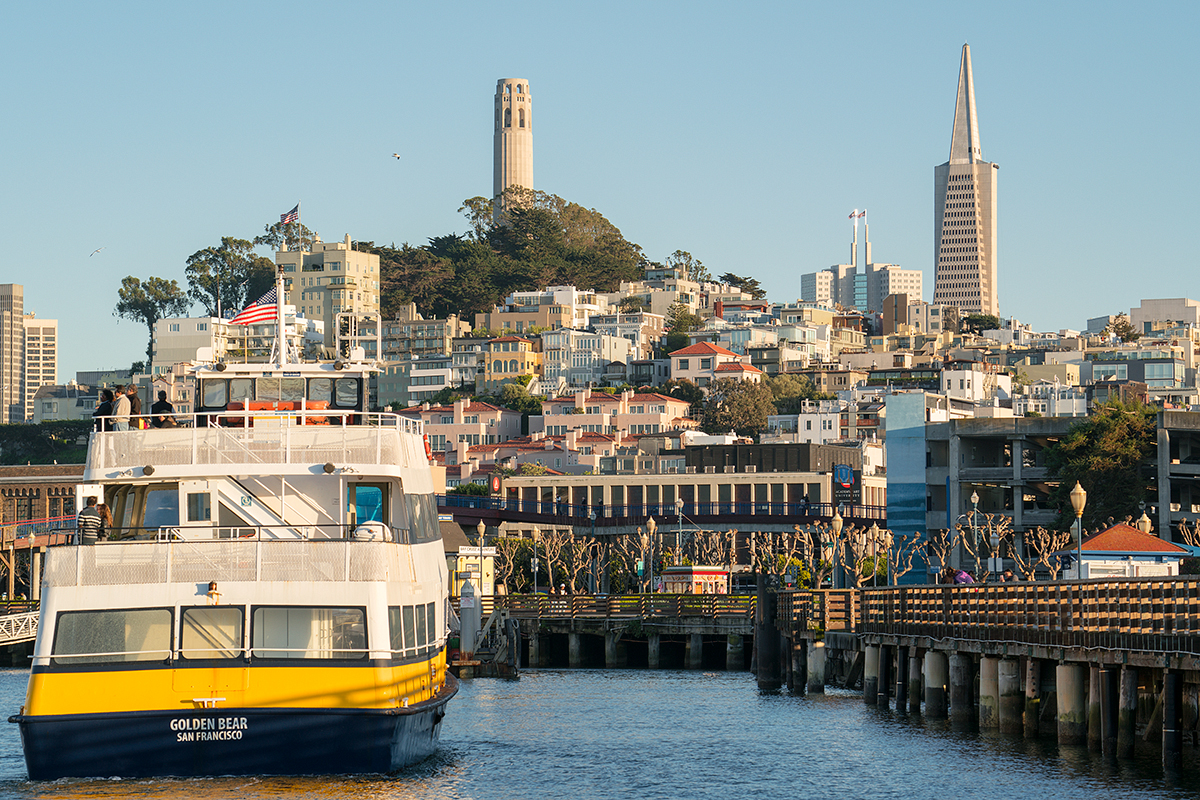
The city from the Golden Bear, near Forbes Island, Pier 39

The Blue & Gold fleet was founded in 1979 by Roger Murphy, beginning excursion service from the West Marina of Pier 39 with three vessels. The company became the operator of the Alameda/Oakland commuter ferry (under contract with the City of Alameda) in 1991, the Vallejo ferry (under contract with the City of Vallejo) on July 1, 1994, and ferries to Sausalito, Tiburon, Angel Island, and Alcatraz (all acquired from Red & White Fleet) in 1997. In 2006 the contract for the Alcatraz service was lost to Hornblower. In 2011 Blue & Gold won the contract to operate the consolidated San Francisco Bay Ferry system, which subsumed the Alameda/Oakland and Vallejo routes and over the following decade grew to include four other cross-Bay commuter routes. The company ended commute-hour service to Tiburon in 2017 and all service to both Tiburon and Angel Island in January 2022; these services were subsequently taken over by Golden Gate Ferry.
