= 45 (2009 film) =

- Theatrical release poster
- Directed by: Peter Coster
- Written by: Peter Coster
- Produced by: Peter Coster and JC Mac
- Starring: Chico Slimani; Brendan Carr; Lauretta Lewis; Terry Bird; Paul Jaques; Tom Gerald; Peter Coster; JC Mac
- Cinematography: Darren Berry
- Music by: Chris Southwell
- Distributed by: Dragons Lair Films
- Release date: 1 May 2009 (Swansea Bay)
- Running time: 12 minutes
- Country: United Kingdom
- Language: English

45 is a 2009 short film produced and directed by Peter Coster and starring JC Mac. The 12-minute comedy-drama-psychological thriller is Coster's debut film as director. A Dragons Lair films and MaChico bros production.

== Plot ==
Jaden Cole (JC Mac) relives an important day in his life over and over, each rewound day sees new information. Jaden's girlfriend Jessica (Laurette Lewis) comforts him, reassuring him that he is only worrying about the important boxing fight he has later that day. As he is caught in a twilight zone of conflicting realities unravels a shocking conclusion as he prepares for a big fight that may already be lost by default.

== Cast ==
- Chico Slimani ... Banks
- Terry Bird ... Jaden's trainer Terry
- Lauretta Lewis ... Jaden's girlfriend Jessica
- Brendan Carr ... Jason
- Peter Coster ... Brian
- Adrian Doughty ... Compere
- Tony Fordham ... Boxing Referee
- Tom Gerald ... Bank's trainer
- Victoria Hopkins ... Ring card girl
- Paul Jaques ... Simon
- JC Mac ... Jaden Cole

== Festivals ==
- Swansea Bay Film Festival (British premiere)
- Galway International Film Festival (Ireland premiere)
- Palm Springs Film Festival (American premiere)
- British Film Festival in Los Angeles
- Thailand International Film Festival

== Awards ==
- Best UK short film (under 20 min) at the Swansea Bay Film Festival
- Best UK short film (under 20 min) at the India Intentional Film Festival
