= Winner Takes All (2004 film) =

- Directed by: Helen M Grace
- Written by: JC Mac; Chico Slimani; Helen M Grace
- Produced by: JC Mac; Helen M Grace; Chico Slimani
- Starring: JC Mac; Chico Slimani; Lauretta Lewis; Barber Ali
- Narrated by: Chico Slimani
- Cinematography: Peter Thornton
- Edited by: Barrett Heathcote
- Music by: Chico Slimani
- Release date: 2004 (Wales)
- Running time: 6 minutes
- Country: United Kingdom
- Language: English language

Winner Takes All is a 2004 British short film directed by Helen M Grace, written by Machico Bros & Helen M Grace.

Nominated for BAFTA Cymru Best Short Film award 2004/2005.

The short film stars JC Mac, Chico Slimani, Lauretta Lewis, and Barber Ali.

== Plot ==
A stranger (JC Mac) walks into a bar and is given a challenge to win a pot of money. There are three tasks that he must complete, but he is distracted by a young woman and doesn't listen to the rules properly. The result is that he completes the challenge in a mixed-up and shocking way.
His story is told in rhyme by a Narrator (Chico Slimani).

== Cast ==
- Barber Ali as Barman
- John Campbell-Mac as Stranger (as John Cambell-Mac)
- Dave Courtney as Gambler
- Lauretta Lewis as Lovely Lady

== Production ==
Filmed for two days at Caesar's Nightclub in Streatham, South London in September 2003.
