= Are You Ready for Love? =

Are You Ready For Love?
- Film poster
- Directed by: Helen M. Grace
- Written by: Roberto Trippini, Helen M Grace, Trudy Sargent
- Produced by: Trudy Sargent
- Starring: Lucy Punch; Andy Nyman; Ed Byrne
- Cinematography: Nick Tebbet
- Edited by: Laurie McDowell
- Music by: Nigel Champion
- Release date: November 2006 (Cardiff Film Festival)
- Running time: 88 minutes
- Country: United Kingdom
- Language: English

Are You Ready for Love? is a 2006 British romantic comedy film directed by Helen M. Grace and starring Lucy Punch, Andy Nyman, and Ed Byrne. It was produced by Carnaby Films.

== Plot ==
A pair of American authors promise to find love for three single Londoners in just three days, as a publicity stunt for the UK launch of their book Are You Ready for Love?... How to Find Love in Three Days. The fictitious authors Randy Bush and Candy Connor offer "a fail-safe guide to instant romance" to their dating victims, Melanie, Barry, and Luke.

When Candy and Randy, celebrated Californian self-help gurus, come to London to launch their bestselling book ‘Are You Ready For Love? How To Find Love in Three Days’, they choose three single Brits for a publicity stunt to prove that their advice works. Luke, Barry and Melanie are the three unlucky-in-love hopefuls who pay good money to take part in Candy and Randy’s promotional promise. Luke, a self-confessed ‘Monster Lover’, is a 38-year-old ageing pop star who relies on his status as a one hit wonder to attract one night stands. He is in desperate need of help to find a real relationship. Barry, a 35-year-old Jewish dentist is a perfectionist with high expectations for his perfect partner. He turns to Candy and Randy in a last attempt to avoid his domineering mother’s match-making scheme. Melanie, a 32-year-old photographer, is a hopeless romantic looking for ‘The One’. Always seeming to find the wrong one, she believes that Candy and Randy will help her to find true love.

These three single Brits have 72 hours to find love by following the advice given to them by the love gurus and their new book. Throughout this three-day period, their every move is filmed by roving cameras who are documenting their success for a promotional TV programme to be shown at a press conference after the three days are up.

== Cast ==
- Michael Brandon as Randy
- Ed Byrne as Luke
- Andy Nyman as Barry Schneider
- Lucy Punch as Melanie
- Leigh Zimmerman as Candy
- Lucy Liemann as Rachel
- Craig Kelly as Leo
- Elizabeth Berrington as Debbie
- Denise Van Outen as Rita
- Lucy Danny as Becky
- Jodie Marsh as Mandi
- Neil Newbon as Rob
- Olegar Fedoro as Lionel
- Juliette Kaplan as Barry's Mother
- Dean Davies as Bored
- Jeremy Swift as James
- Lauretta Lewis as Jill
- Anna Eccleston as Lee's Partner

== Awards / Film Festivals ==
- Winner: Audience award (Cardiff Film Festival 2006).
- Winner: Best Screenplay, Best Director, Best Ensemble Cast (Monaco International Film Festival, 2006).
- Screened in California (Calabasas Method Fest Film Festival, 2007).

== Production ==
Filming Are You Ready For Love? commenced in September 2005 after 4 weeks of pre-production. The film was shot entirely on location in London over 5 weeks and encompassed some of London’s most celebrated landmarks, and shooting location included the streets of Soho, Central Hall in Westminster, Hampstead Heath, Streatham ice rink and the South Bank.

The film includes a speed dating sequence that takes place on board the charter boat The Dixie Queen on the River Thames at Tower Bridge. The Bridge opened for the boat to pass through during the shoot.

Filming finished on 24 October 2005 and the film was in post production until the end of March 2006.

Are You Ready for Love? was released on DVD by Sony on 9 February 2009.

== Reviews ==
Ventura County Reporter
