= Oakland Ferry Terminal =

San Francisco Bay ferry terminal located in Oakland, California

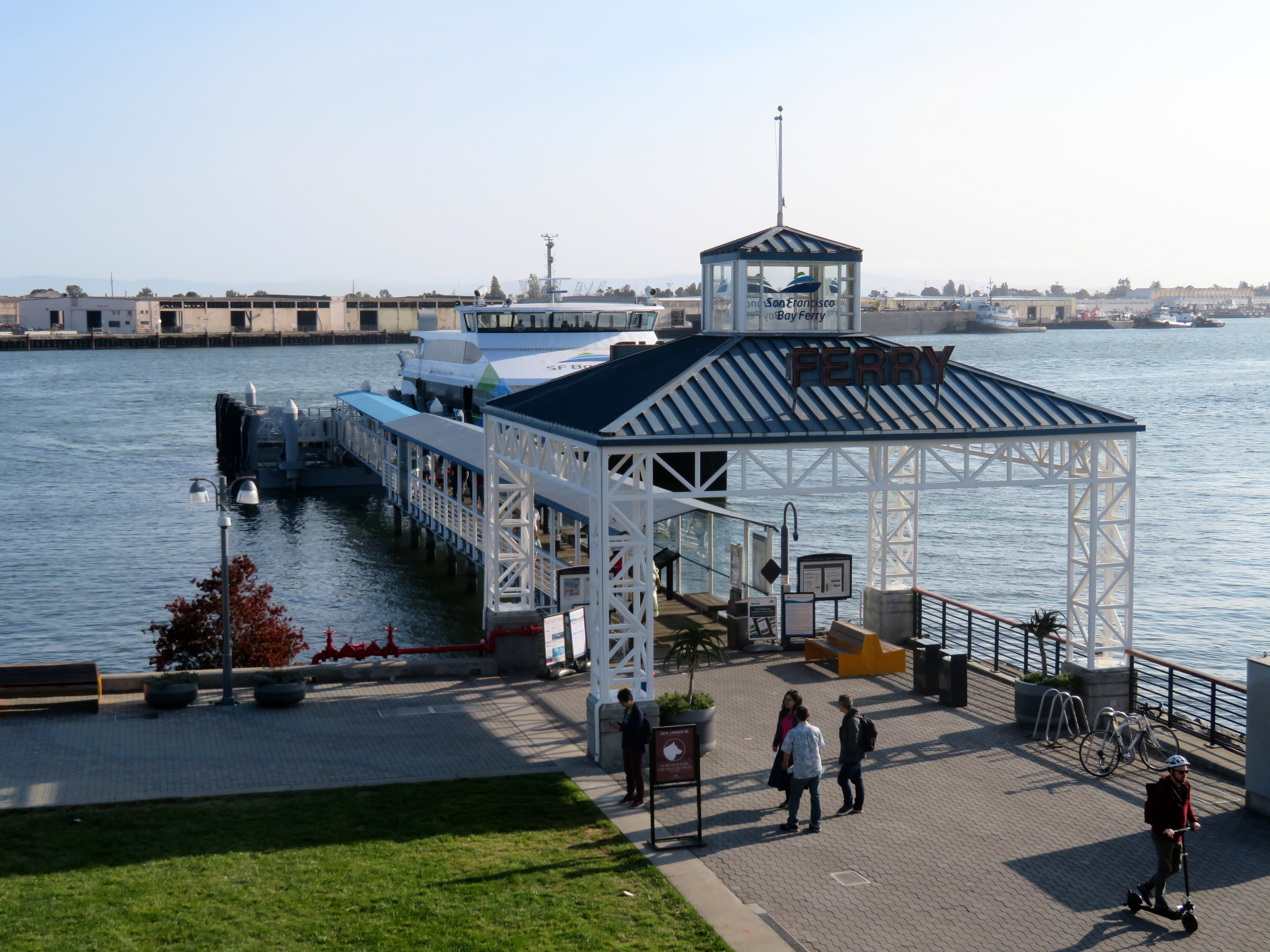
- Oakland Ferry Terminal in July 2019

General information
- Location: 10 Clay Street; Oakland, California; United States
- Coordinates: 37.795208°N 122.2802275°W
- Operated by: San Francisco Bay Ferry
- Line: Oakland/Alameda-San Francisco
- Connections: AC Transit: 12, 72, 72M, 72R, Broadway Shuttle (at Oakland – Jack London Square station)
Location

The Oakland Ferry Terminal (also known as Clay Street Ferry Terminal and Jack London Square Ferry Terminal) is a ferry terminal on the San Francisco Bay, located in Jack London Square in Oakland, California.

== History ==
=== Origins ===
The terminal opened in the twentieth century to provide a commute option for passengers headed to San Francisco across the bay. It was predated by numerous passenger, cargo, and vehicle ferries that connected the mainland with San Francisco's rather isolated peninsula before the advent of numerous bridges crossing the bay. The ferries declined upon the opening of the Oakland-San Francisco Bay Bridge but as traffic and time increased a water crossing service was reborn.

=== Rebirth ===
The service was created by pressure from the community to have a ferry service similar to that offered from Marin County to San Francisco's north. Their ferry service declined after the opening of bridges and although routes and terminals were closed, streamlined, or eliminated - the service was never abandoned. This was much to the benefit of the waterfront communities of that region.

Oakland also presented the unique challenge of an adjacent island, the city of Alameda being located just hundreds of feet away with only one congested roadway tunnel linking the city's downtown and business core to the island's population centers directly. The Oakland Alameda Estuary presented many unique localized peculiarities. It is a major shipping channel and the shipping traffic of the Port of Oakland along with a highly developed shoreline prohibited a new bridge. Another fact, tunneling in an earthquake and liquefaction plagued region is extremely expensive for a rather poor community. Lastly what remains of the wetlands of the once large estuarine habitat is fervently protected by locals in order to preserve wildlife in addition to flood and pollution controls offered by these natural tidal flats and shoreline vegetation.

=== Ferry ===
For these reasons a service was established between a new Alameda Ferry Terminal and Oakland with continuing commuter service to the San Francisco Ferry Building and also Fisherman's Wharf at Pier 41. When the new shoreside Oracle Park opened season service was added in addition to expedition service to Angel Island State Park. In 2012 service was added to a new South San Francisco Ferry Terminal at the Oyster Point marina and park.
