= Jack London Square =

Neighborhood of Oakland in Alameda, California, US

- Neighborhood of Oakland
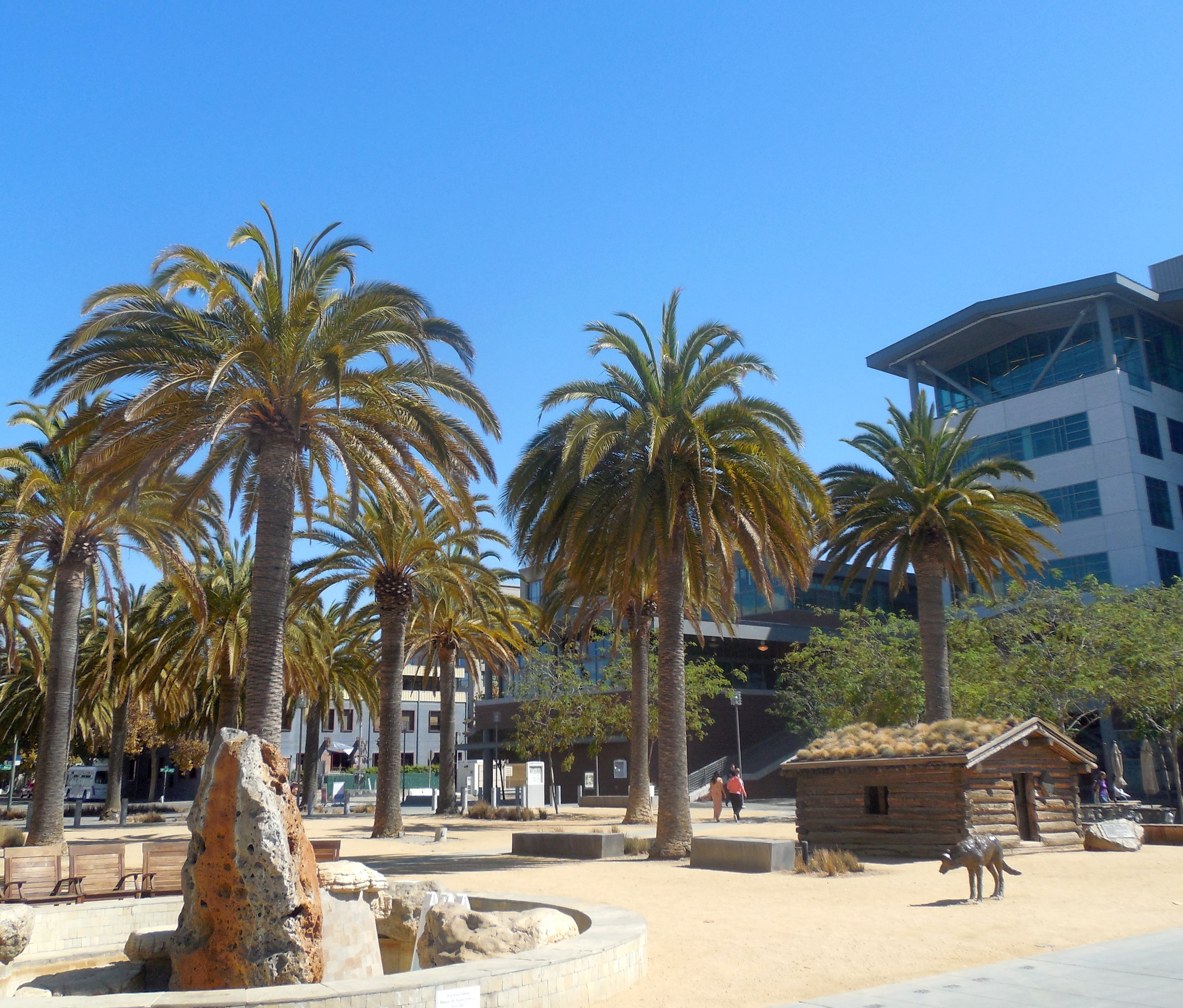
- Jack London Square in 2015

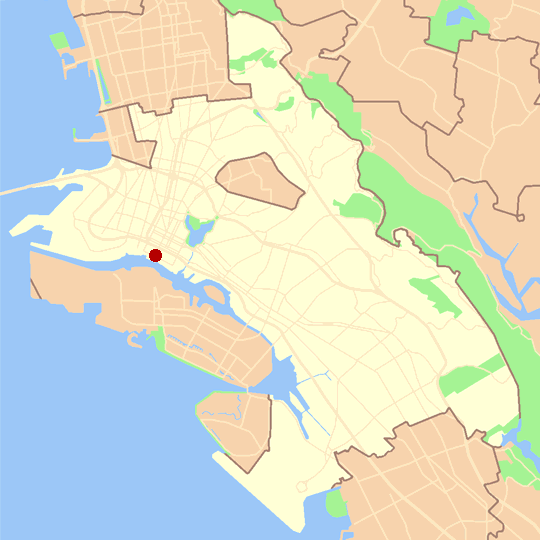
- Location of Jack London Square in Oakland
- Coordinates: 37.7942°N 122.2747°W
- Country: United States
- State: California
- County: Alameda
- City: Oakland

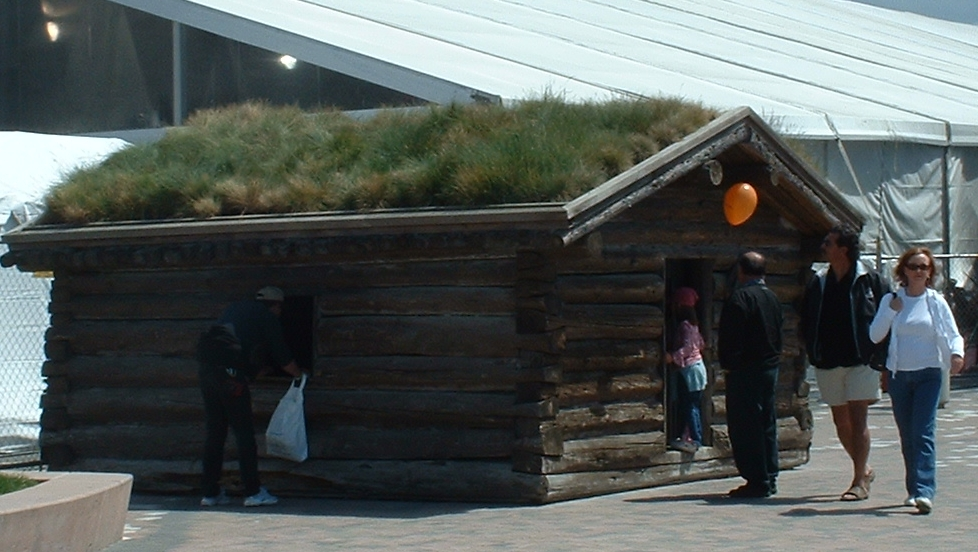
Reconstruction of Jack London's Klondike Hut in Jack London Square

Jack London Square is a neighborhood on the waterfront of Oakland, California, United States. Named after the author Jack London and owned by the Port of Oakland. It is the home of stores, restaurants, hotels, Amtrak's Jack London Square station, a San Francisco Bay Ferry ferry dock, the historic Heinold's First and Last Chance Saloon, the (re-located) cabin where Jack London lived in the Klondike, and a movie theater. The former presidential yacht USS Potomac is moored at an adjacent slip.

== History ==
The area developed as a warehouse and industrial district due to its proximity to major transportation, including the Southern Pacific Railroad (now Niles Subdivision) on Embarcadero West and the Western Pacific Railroad (now Oakland Subdivision) on Third Street, as well as the Oakland Estuary.

The area between Broadway, Webster, First Street (Embarcadero) and the estuary was named Jack London Square in 1950. On May 1, 1951, the area was formally dedicated and a plaque placed at the foot of Broadway.

== Geography ==
Jack London Square is located at the south end of Broadway along the Oakland waterfront across the Oakland Estuary from Alameda.

The name has also come to refer to the formerly industrial neighborhood surrounding Jack London Square now known as the Jack London District, which has undergone significant rehabilitation in the last 21st Century, including loft conversions and new construction.

Former California Governor (and former Oakland mayor) Jerry Brown made his home here before moving north to the Uptown neighborhood.

== Tenants and businesses ==
KTVU (Channel 2), the Bay Area's Fox affiliate, has had studios at the Square since it began broadcasting on March 3, 1958, and the offices of the Port of Oakland are located there as well. The Square was also the temporary home of the Oakland Tribune from 1989 to 1996 after the newspaper was forced to abandon the landmark downtown Tribune Tower due to damage it sustained in the 1989 Loma Prieta earthquake.

Other businesses at Jack London Square range from the Oakland Athletics team headquarters and software firm Navis LLC, to restaurants such as Farmhouse, Noka Ramen, Scott's Seafood and Yoshi's restaurant and jazz club. California Canoe & Kayak retail and kayak rental shop has been located in Jack London Square since 1993.

== Railways and transit ==
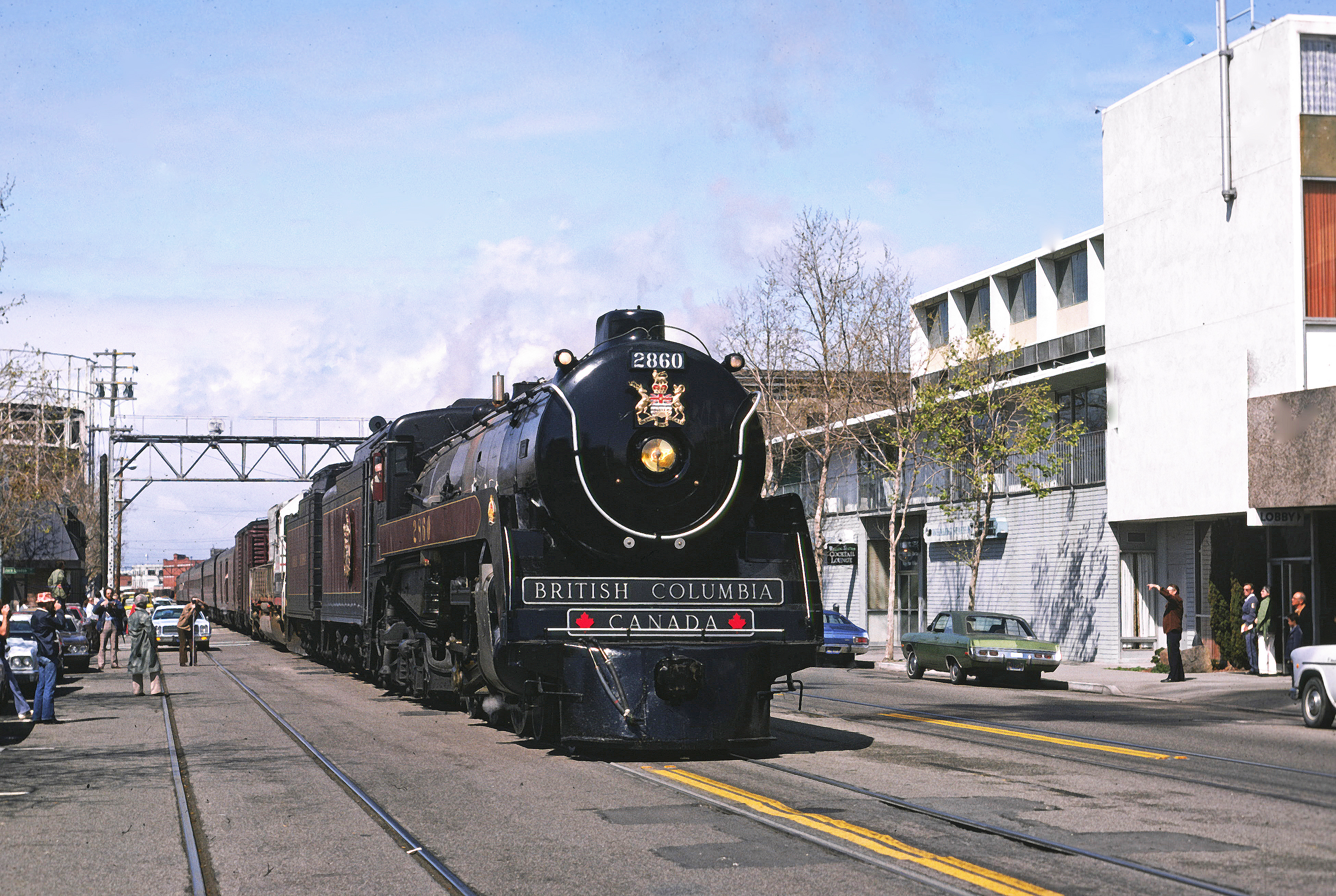
An excursion train pulled by Canadian Pacific H1e Royal Hudson No. 2860 visits Jack London Square in 1977

A mainline railroad runs through the middle of Embarcadero West, with the train speed limit set at 15 mph (25 km/h). Trains served 16th Street station until earthquake damage in 1989; afterwards, that station was replaced in 1994 by the present-day Jack London Square station. The tracks running through Jack London Square are used by BNSF and Union Pacific and Amtrak's Capitol Corridor, Coast Starlight and Gold Runner services. The trains share the road with automobiles, AC Transit buses, and pedestrians. A second Transbay Tube may include a BART station at the square. Another possibility is an aerial tramway to BART stations in downtown Oakland.

== Design and development ==
Recently, under lead property developer, Ellis Partners, many new commercial and entertainment spaces were developed in the neighborhood. Recent new components include the 55 Harrison building, a 178,000-square-foot (16,500 m^{2}) mid-rise by RMW Architects in association with Steve Worthington. The public spaces, developed by SWA Group extended the city closer to the waterfront by adding accessible waterfront spaces supporting a variety of programs and events from farmers markets to festivals and events.

== See also ==
- Chinatown, Oakland, California
- Old Oakland
