= Winner Takes All (Binkley book) =

Book by Christina Binkley

Winner Takes All: Steve Wynn, Kirk Kerkorian, Gary Loveman, and the Race to Own Las Vegas
- Author: Christina Binkley
- Cover artist: Anton Markous
- Language: English
- Genre: Nonfiction
- Publisher: Hyperion
- Publication date: March 4, 2008
- Publication place: United States
- Pages: 304
- ISBN: 978-1-4013-0236-8

Winner Takes All: Steve Wynn, Kirk Kerkorian, Gary Loveman, and the Race to Own Las Vegas is a 2008 nonfiction book written by Christina Binkley.

== Overview ==
Winner Takes All recounts the real estate development history of the Las Vegas Strip between 1998 and 2007. The book primarily covers three major corporate deals: Kirk Kerkorian's 2000 purchase of Steve Wynn's Mirage Resorts; MGM Mirage's 2004 buyout of Mandalay Resort Group; and Gary Loveman's Harrah's 2004 takeover of Caesars.

== Background ==
From 1997 to 2005, Binkley was the lead Las Vegas reporter for The Wall Street Journal. She spent two years additional years conducting research for the book from 2005 to 2007.

== Reception ==
The book's narrative cohesion was criticized by The New York Times. The book was praised in the Nevada Historical Quarterly as an insightful window into high-stakes corporate brinksmanship, but was criticized for its historical inaccuracies.
