= Red & White Fleet =

Red and White Fleet
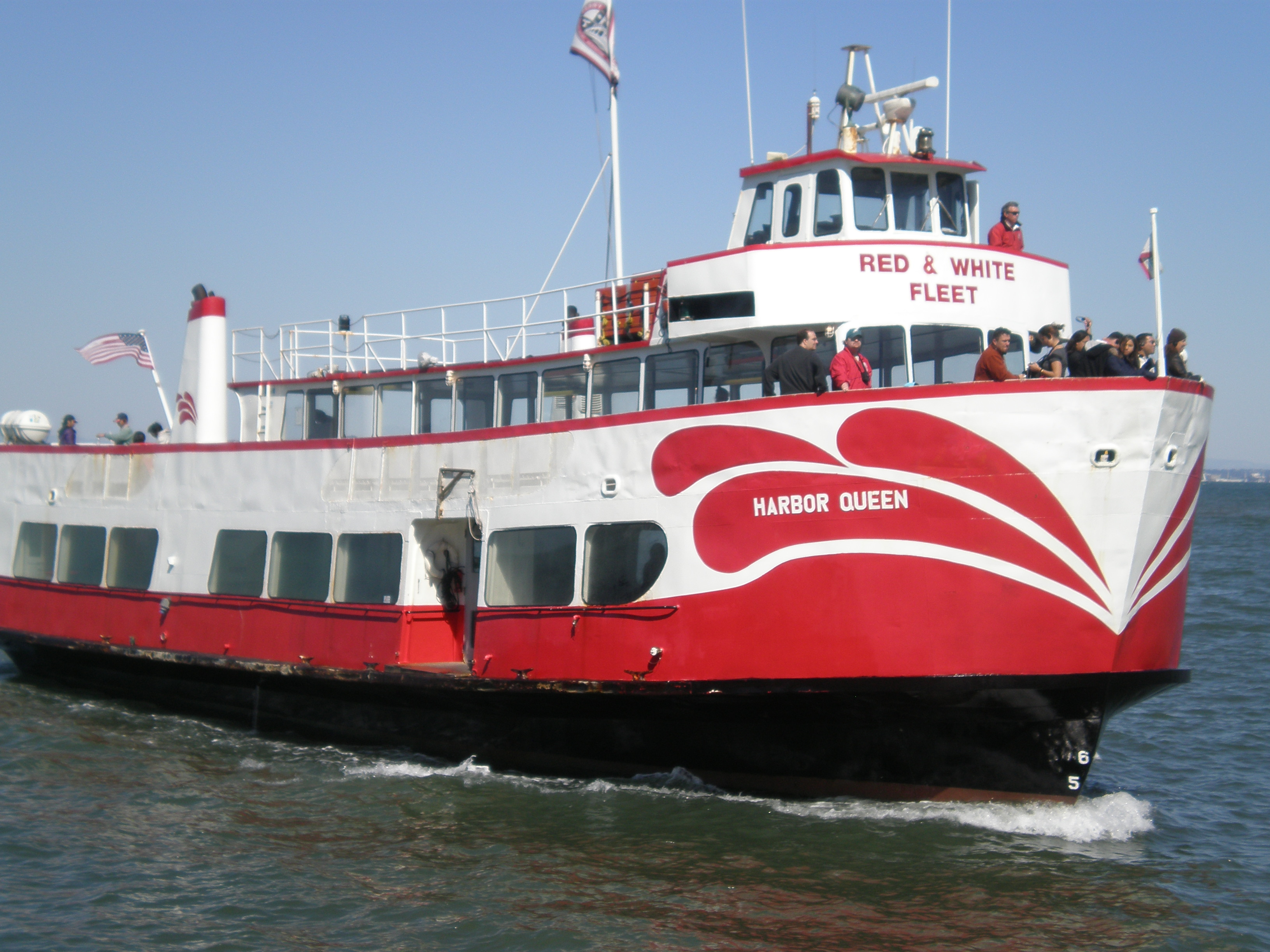
- The Harbor Queen coming in to dock at Pier 45
- Industry: Tourism
- Founded: 1892; 134 years ago San Francisco Bay, California, U.S.
- Founder: Thomas Crowley
- Headquarters: Pier 43 1/2, Fisherman's Wharf, San Francisco, California, U.S.
- Key people: Tom Escher (president)
- Website: www.redandwhite.com

Red and White Fleet is a sightseeing and charter tour company operating in the San Francisco Bay Area of California since at least 1892.

Based in the US, the site and the audio on the cruise are, as of 2016, available in 16 languages.

== History ==
In the late 1930s, for the Golden Gate International Exposition, Thomas Bannon Crowley, founder of Crowley Launch and Tugboat Co., the precursor of Crowley Maritime founded the Red and White Fleet as a sightseeing business.

In 1997, Tom Escher, a grandson of the founder, purchased the Red and White Fleet from Crowley Maritime. The ferry operations were sold separately and concurrently to the Blue & Gold Fleet.

The company offers scenic tours of San Francisco Bay and is located at Pier 43 1/2 in Fisherman's Wharf. Red and White Fleet also offers land-based tour packages in concert with other suppliers and offers a number of charter packages for corporate events, as well.

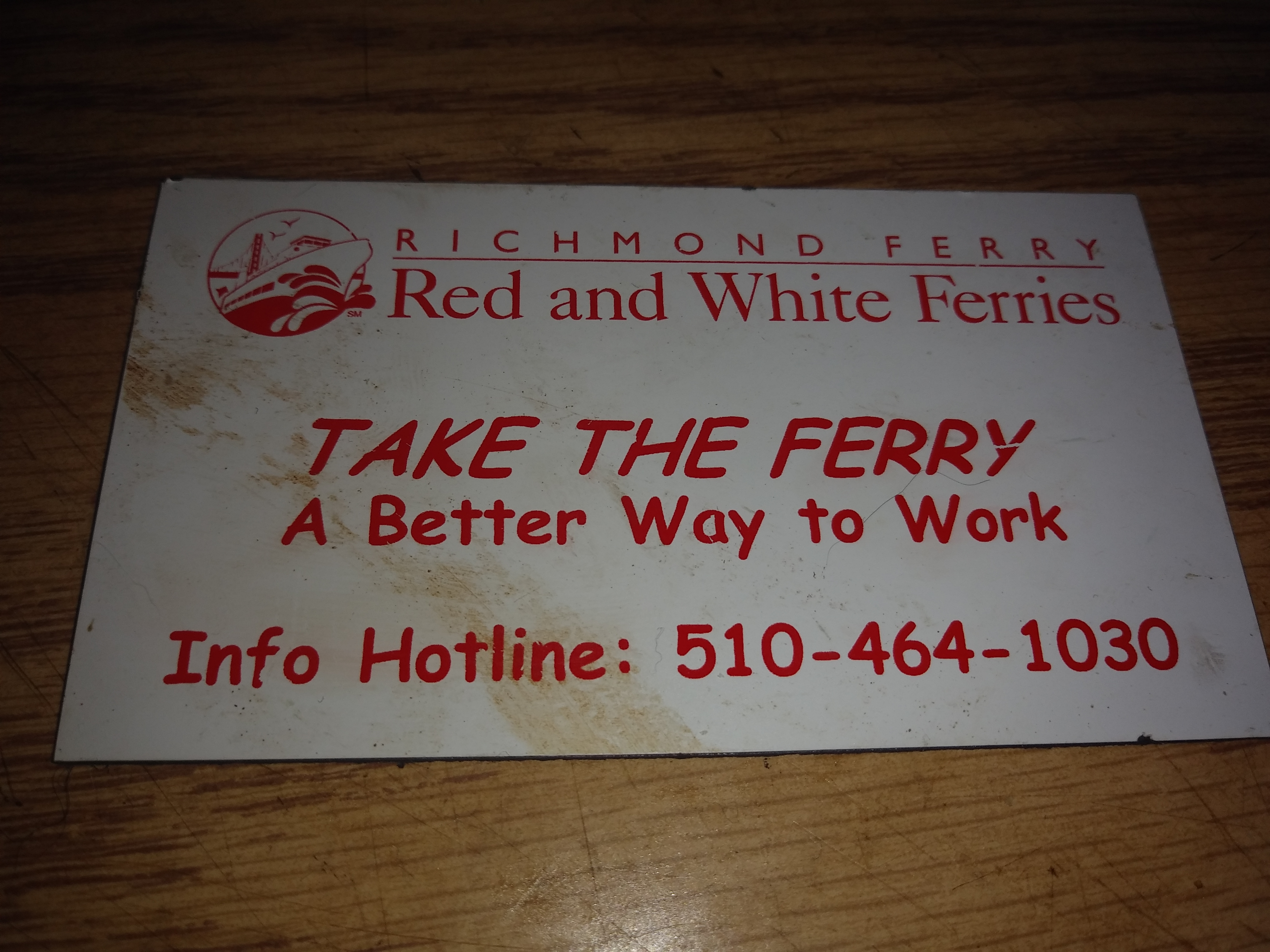
Richmond Ferry marketing magnet, circa 2000

The fleet provided commuter ferry operations from 1999 to 2000 from the Richmond Ferry Terminal to San Francisco.

In September 2018 the company launched service of a plug-in hybrid ferry, the first built in the United States furthermore in 2020 they are expected to begin operating their first hydrogen fuel cell powered vessel.
