= Helen Grace (director) =

Welsh film director

Helen M. Grace is a Welsh film director (Are You Ready for Love?).

== Awards ==
- Best Director, Are You Ready For Love?, Monaco International Film Festival, 2006.
- Best screenwriter, Are You Ready For Love?, Monaco International Film Festival, 2006.
- Nominated: Best Short Film BAFTA Cymru Awards 2004/5.
