= San Francisco Bay Ferry =

Public transit passenger ferry service in the San Francisco Bay

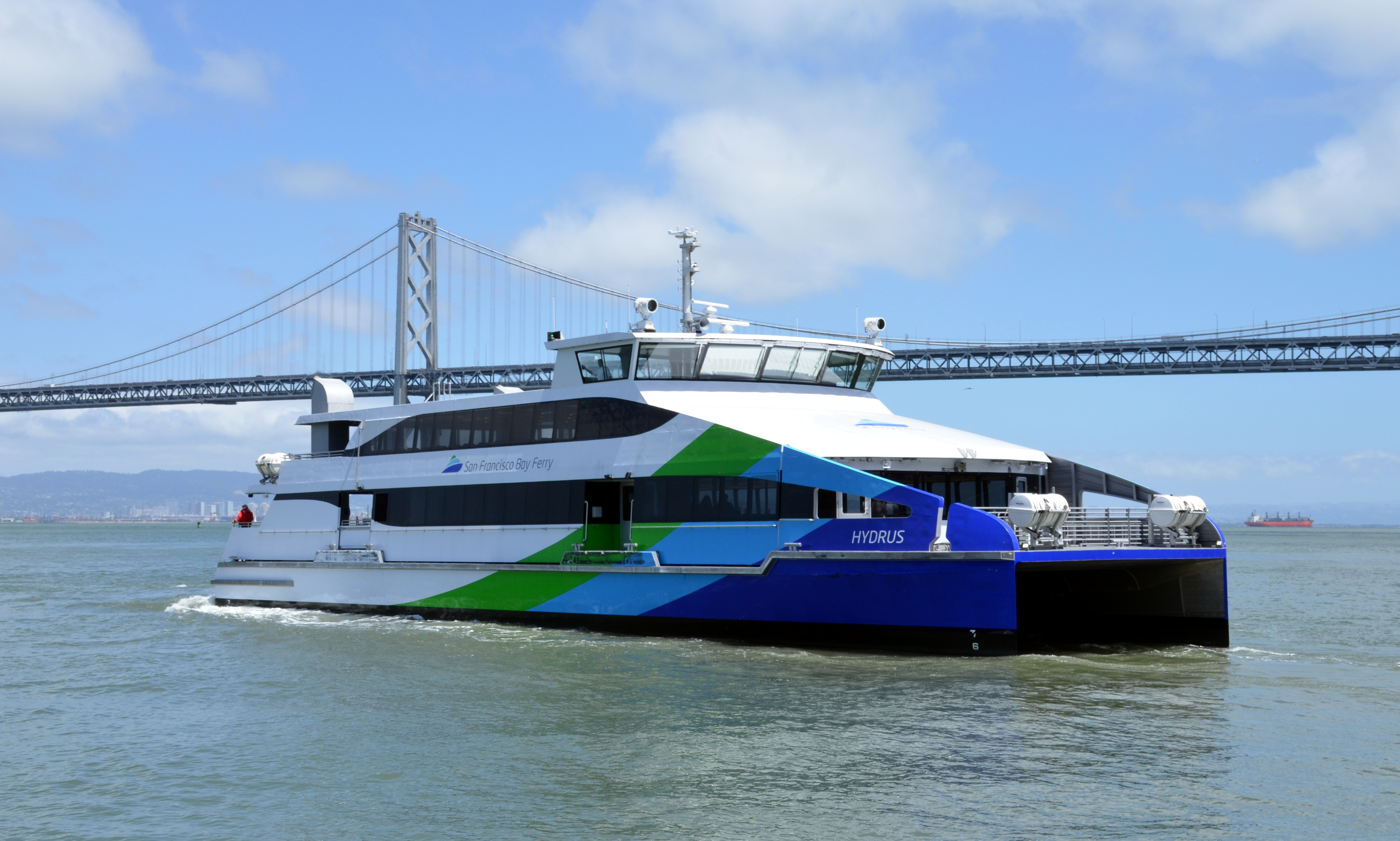
- Hydrus departing the Ferry Building in San Francisco
- Locale: San Francisco Bay Area
- Waterway: San Francisco Bay
- Transit type: Passenger ferry
- Owner: San Francisco Bay Area Water Emergency Transportation Authority
- Operator: Blue & Gold Fleet
- Began operation: 2011 (consolidation of existing service)
- No. of lines: 6 (plus 5 special)
- No. of vessels: 13
- No. of terminals: 9
- Daily ridership: 11,600 (weekdays, Q2 2026)
- Yearly ridership: 3,013,100 (2025)
- Website: sanfranciscobayferry.com

San Francisco Bay Ferry is a public transit passenger ferry service in San Francisco Bay, administered by the San Francisco Bay Area Water Emergency Transportation Authority (WETA) and operated under contract by the privately owned Blue and Gold Fleet. In 2025, the system had a ridership of 3,013,100, or about 11,600 per weekday as of the second quarter of 2026.

San Francisco Bay Ferry is a different system from Golden Gate Ferry, which provides passenger ferry service between San Francisco and Marin County.

== Routes ==
San Francisco Bay Ferry operates six ferry routes:

- Alameda Seaplane: Weekday-only service between the Alameda Seaplane Lagoon on the southern shore of Alameda Island and the San Francisco Ferry Building.
- Harbor Bay: Weekday-only service between the Harbor Bay ferry terminal on Bay Farm Island and the San Francisco Ferry Building.
- Oakland & Alameda: All-day weekday and weekend service between the Oakland Ferry Terminal in Oakland, the Main Street Terminal on the northern shore of Alameda Island and the San Francisco Ferry Building.
- Richmond: All-day weekday and weekend service between the Richmond Ferry Terminal in Richmond and the San Francisco Ferry Building.
- South San Francisco: Weekday peak-hour-only service between the South San Francisco Ferry Terminal in South San Francisco, the Main Street Terminal on the northern shore of Alameda Island, and the Oakland Ferry Terminal.
- Vallejo: All-day weekday and weekend service between Mare Island Ferry Terminal on Mare Island, Vallejo Ferry Terminal in Vallejo, and the San Francisco Ferry Building.

There is one "short hop" route that does not cross the bay:

- Alameda Short Hop: On weekdays, connects Main Street Terminal on the northern shore of Alameda Island with the Oakland Ferry Terminal in the morning, and Oakland with Alameda in the evening. At other times this connection is served by the Oakland & Alameda route above.

There are also four seasonal sports routes:

- Oracle Park–Oakland & Alameda: Service between the Main Street Terminal on the northern shore of Alameda Island, the Oakland Ferry Terminal and the China Basin Ferry Terminal adjacent to Oracle Park for most San Francisco Giants home games and concerts at Oracle Park.
- Oracle Park–Vallejo: Service between the Vallejo Ferry Terminal in Vallejo, and the China Basin Ferry Terminal adjacent to Oracle Park for all San Francisco Giants weekend home games. For weekday home games, there is direct service back to Vallejo, but not to San Francisco.
- Oracle Park-Richmond : Service between the Richmond Ferry Terminal and the Pier 48.5 Ferry Terminal for select Giants home games
- Chase Center–Oakland & Alameda: Service between the Main Street Terminal on the northern shore of Alameda Island, the Oakland Ferry Terminal and Pier 48 near Chase Center for all Golden State Warriors home games

== History ==
=== Vallejo ===
Commuter service to Vallejo began in September 1986. It operated by Red & White Fleet without subsidy, though Vallejo funded the simultaneously opened ferry terminal. The company lost money on the commuter service; in October 1988, the city began subsidizing service. The passage of Regional Measure 1 the next month provided additional funding. After the 1989 earthquake, service was temporarily increased using three ferries rented from the Washington State Ferries system. The 1990 passage of Proposition 116 provided $10 million for the purchase of new vessels, with an additional $17 million from the 1991 Intermodal Surface Transportation Efficiency Act. A new vessel (MV Jet Cat Express) and a new operator (Blue & Gold Fleet) began operations on July 1, 1994. Two high-speed catamarans (MV Intintoli and MV Mare Island) were put into service in May 1997 under a new Baylink brand. The MV Solano was added in 2004, allowing an increase from 11 to 15 daily round trips. This link is part of the Western Express Bicycle Route, and is also part of US Bike Route 50.

=== Emergency service ===
In the days and weeks following the 1989 Loma Prieta earthquake, ferry service was hastily restored between San Francisco and the East Bay while the San Francisco–Oakland Bay Bridge was closed for repairs. After the Bay Bridge reopened in November 1989, service between Jack London Square, Main Street Alameda, and the San Francisco Ferry Building was maintained as the Alameda/Oakland Ferry, managed by the City of Alameda and operated by Red & White Fleet with funding from local governments and Caltrans.

In March 1992, Alameda Harbor Bay Ferry service was begun between Harbor Bay ferry terminal on Bay Farm Island and the San Francisco Ferry Building. It was initially funded by Harbor Bay Isle Associates, the master real estate developer of the Harbor Bay development.

The popularity of the revived ferries and the need for a robust ferry system in the event that the region's roads and tunnels become impassable in an emergency ultimately led to the creation of the San Francisco Bay Ferry system. The San Francisco Bay Area Water Emergency Transportation Authority (WETA) is a government entity created by the California state legislature in 2007 by Senate Bill 976. The organization is a successor to the San Francisco Bay Water Transit Authority (WTA), which the legislature established in 1999 with Senate Bill 428.

=== Consolidation and expansion ===
WETA assumed responsibility and ownership of the SF–Oakland/Alameda and SF–Harbor Bay ferry services previously operated by the City of Alameda in May 2011 and January 2012 respectively. Service between Oakland Ferry Terminal and the city of South San Francisco began on June 4, 2012, which also coincided with use of the new San Francisco Bay Ferry name. WETA assumed control of Vallejo Baylink service on July 1, 2012. Approximately half of the agency's operating funds come from Regional Measure 2, a $1 toll increase on Bay Area bridges approved in 2004, and the other half comes from fares. Since 2011, the private Blue & Gold Fleet has been under contract to operate the ferries on behalf of WETA.

On April 29, 2013, a third evening trip from South San Francisco to Oakland was added, as well as a midday leisure-oriented round trip on Wednesdays and Fridays between South San Francisco and Pier 41 via the Ferry Building. South San Francisco–Ferry Building service was expanded to Monday through Friday on November 3, 2014, with the Pier 41 segment dropped. The single reverse commute trip on the South San Francisco–Oakland/Alameda route was dropped on May 4, 2015, leaving only three peak-direction round trips. South San Francisco–Ferry Building service ended on July 2, 2018.

Seasonal direct service between Oakland/Alameda and Angel Island ended on October 26, 2014; timed transfers at Pier 41 for Blue & Gold Fleet service to Angel Island were introduced beginning with the 2015 summer season. On January 2, 2017, WETA increased weekday Vallejo service to 14 southbound and 13 northbound trips, with route 200 bus service discontinued. SolTrans began operating a single northbound route 82 bus trip via the Ferry Building in the late evening, intended for passengers who miss the last ferry to Vallejo. On March 6, 2017, service to Mare Island began as a short extension of Vallejo service. Initially, seven weekday round trips and four weekend round trips were extended to Mare Island.

Weekday commuter service from a remodeled Richmond Ferry Terminal, in Richmond's Marina Bay District, to San Francisco was approved for funding and planning in 2015. Service commenced on January 10, 2019, with commute and limited reverse commute services. Weekday peak and evening service between the San Francisco Ferry Building and the Alameda Seaplane Lagoon on the southern shore of Alameda Island began July 1, 2021.

=== Future expansion ===
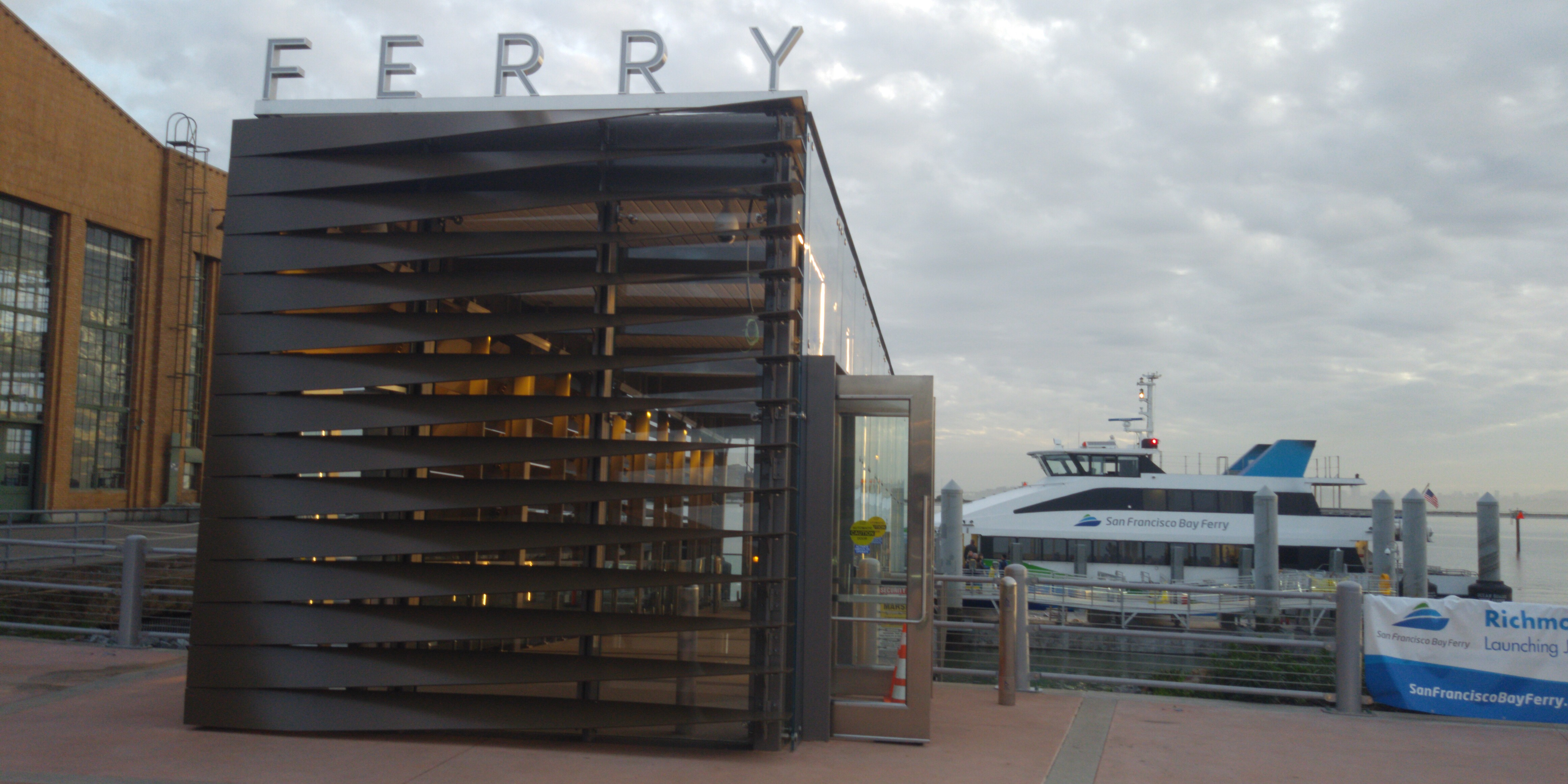
Richmond Ferry Terminal opened in 2019

An additional terminal in Mission Bay intended to serve events at Chase Center is expected to open in 2024 at the foot of 16th Street, with an interim terminal currently located at Pier 48.

WETA plans to establish new service from Berkeley and Redwood City to San Francisco. Its long-term vision also includes service from San Francisco to Antioch, Hercules, Martinez, and Treasure Island. WETA projects the fleet to increase from 13 to 57 vessels by 2035 to accommodate these new services plus frequency increases on existing routes.

=== Annual ridership ===
| FY* | Alameda/Oakland | Harbor Bay | Richmond | South San Francisco | Vallejo | Systemwide | %± |
|---|---|---|---|---|---|---|---|
| 2006–07 | 443,000 | 130,000 | — | — | 897,000 | 1,470,000 | — |
| 2007–08 | 459,000 | 145,000 | — | — | 848,000 | 1,452,000 | −1.2% |
| 2008–09 | 400,000 | 143,000 | — | — | 690,000 | 1,233,000 | −15.1% |
| 2009–10 | 421,000 | 147,000 | — | — | 682,000 | 1,250,000 | +1.4% |
| 2010–11 | 455,130 | 154,000 | — | — | 697,000 | 1,306,000 | +4.5% |
| 2011–12 | 545,393 | 177,159 | — | 5,141 | 668,770 | 1,391,322 | +6.5% |
| 2012–13 | 606,960 | 203,131 | — | 40,505 | 713,300 | 1,563,896 | +12.4% |
| 2013–14 | 821,633 | 246,695 | — | 84,098 | 826,445 | 1,978,871 | +26.5% |
| 2014–15 | 911,473 | 266,304 | — | 107,389 | 858,665 | 2,143,831 | +8.3% |
| 2015–16 | 1,149,085 | 311,313 | — | 125,946 | 959,939 | 2,546,283 | +18.8% |
| 2016–17 | 1,183,188 | 321,289 | — | 136,320 | 1,000,773 | 2,641,570 | +3.7% |
| 2017–18 | 1,311,041 | 332,283 | — | 144,735 | 1,056,342 | 2,844,401 | +7.7% |
| 2018–19 | 1,384,300 | 355,713 | 84,576 | 142,749 | 1,081,665 | 3,048,733 | +7.18% |

== Fleet ==
As of 2026, the WETA has a fleet of 18 passenger ferries that each carry 225 to 445 passengers depending on their class. The newest four ferries, from the Dorado class, entered service between 2022 and 2025 and have the fastest speed in the fleet at 41 miles per hour (66 km/h). Five electric–battery ferries, each able to carry 150 passengers, are scheduled to enter service beginning in 2027. Long-term plans call for an additional 44 ferries to enter the fleet by 2035.
