= Quiz Kids (game show) =

- Also known as: Bay Area Quiz Kids
- Genre: Game Show
- Created by: (original format); Bob Marks; Liz La Porte
- Developed by: (current format); Marc Balcer
- Directed by: Jim Risinger
- Presented by: Brad Friedman
- Voices of: Rocky Robinson
- Country of origin: United States
- Original language: English
- No. of seasons: 15

Production
- Executive producer: Marc Balcer,
- Production locations: Peninsula TV, San Carlos, CA
- Production company: TV Game Brains LLC

Original release
- Network: KRON-TV
- Release: November 1999 – June 2015

Bay Area Quiz Kids is an academic quiz public-access television show for San Francisco Bay Area high schools. From the start in 1999 it has been hosted by Brad Friedman, the Drama Director at San Mateo High School.

Originally developed as Peninsula Quiz Kids by Bob Marks and Liz La Porte of Peninsula TV Cable 26 (Pen-TV) in 1999, the show began airing on KRON-4 in San Francisco as Bay Area Quiz Kids. The show is now a production of TV Game Brains, headed by Executive Producer Marc Balcer.

Throughout its run, the show has been sponsored by the San Mateo Credit Union. Other sponsors have included Kaiser Permanente, SamTrans, the San Francisco Chronicle, AT&T, Oracle, Fisher Investments, and Wells Fargo Bank.

== Format (until Season 11) ==
Quiz Kids is played by two teams of three players each. The player in the center position is the team captain and is responsible for giving the team's answer on all non-toss-up questions. In early years the format varied somewhat from year to year. A face-off round of five questions from a single field in which one player from each team would answer questions was at one point used, but later dropped. The number of schools involved each year fluctuated from the original 16 up to about 40, but as schools grew discontent with bad judging and bad questions.

== Season 11 (2010–11) ==
Thirty-two teams competed in the 2010–2011 season with the members of the winning team receiving an all-expense-paid trip to Europe courtesy of ACIS. In 2011–12 the competition saw 24 teams. The runners-up receive a $1000 scholarship per student provided by Golden Gate Commandry No. 16, Knights Templar and Burlingame Bodies Ancient and Accepted Scottish Rite of Freemasonry. ACIS withdrew as a sponsor for the 2012–13 year.

In the 2011–2012 season 24 teams competed in round one after a screening process at non-televised tournaments. Several teams were inadvertently permitted a grandfather clause to play without screening, leading to a few problems. Concerns arose because some of losing teams outperformed low-scoring winning teams by as much as 200 points. As a result, an intermediary round was devised whereby the bottom four teams were dropped outright, and the remaining eight teams who had lost in round one played again, with the four winners advancing to the second round with all 12 original winners (regardless of score) to make a total of 16. Round two featured 16 teams who played in eight single elimination matches. The eight survivors were then staggered in a ladder tournament whereby the lower six teams contended for a shot to take on the number two seed (Harker School). The winner of that match would play the number one seed, Bellarmine Prep for the championship. Bellarmine Prep defeated the Menlo School (#3 seed) to win the 2011–2012 season.

=== Game play in 2011–2012 ===
The game is divided into four rounds. There are no point penalties for wrong answers at any point in the game.

- The game begins with a "Three for All round" in which the first part is a tossup open to all six players. The first player who buzzes in must answer without consulting his teammates. If the player is incorrect, the opposing team can consult before giving an answer. If a player answers correctly, his team earns 5 points and receives a second, related, collaboration 5 point question. If the team answers that currently also it receives a third, related, collaboration 15 point question. A clean sweep earned the team 25 points. The other team may not steal either bonus.
- In the Collaboration round, each team chooses one of three categories containing seven questions. Each correct answer earns 10 points; a team that answers all seven correct receives a 30-point bonus for a total of 100 points.
- The main Three for All round features three-part questions exactly like the first round except that the point totals increase to 10, 15, 25 respectively. Correctly answering all three questions earns a team 50 points.
- In the final Countdown round, teams have three minutes to answer tossup questions worth 30 points each. As in the Three for All round, if a player misses a tossup question, the opposing team can consult before answering.

== History ==
BAAL President Gaius Stern worked with the show as a writer and consultant from 2001 to 2003. BAAL Vice President Ross Ritterman served as question writer/editor and show consultant Season 6 through Season 9. In Seasons 8, question material was provided by NAQT and in Season 13 by both NAQT and BAAL.

In some years (2001–2003, 2004–2008, 2010–2012) the Bay Area Academic League (BAAL) has participated in writing the questions and judging the matches. BAAL has organized San Francisco Area High School Quizbowl events since 1995. BAAL was originally an arm of the University of California-Berkeley Quiz Bowl club, until 2001.

The show underwent difficulties from 2008 to 2010, leading many schools to withdraw. A change of leadership in 2010 brought about many reforms.

In 2010 the show underwent a major redesign, under new producer Marc Balcer. Balcer introduced the "Three for All" format and redesigned the set and graphics. In response to many complaints over bad judging, bad questions, and in an effort to improve the integrity of the show, Balcer brought back BAAL president and UC Berkeley classics professor Gaius Stern as editor and judge. In 2013, Jeff Hoppes took over as question writer and judge. Jeff also runs the Northern California Quiz Bowl Alliance.

== Winners ==
- 2000: Menlo-Atherton
- 2001: Menlo-Atherton
- 2002: Menlo-Atherton
- 2003: Menlo-Atherton
- 2004: Half Moon Bay
- 2005: Mission San Jose
- 2006: Bentley
- 2007: Sacred Heart
- 2008: San Mateo
- 2009: Bellarmine
- 2010: Mission San Jose
- 2011: Bellarmine
- 2012: Bellarmine
- 2013: Bellarmine
- 2014: Bellarmine
- 2015: Mission San Jose

== Participating high schools ==
- Archbishop Riordan
- Bellarmine
- Bentley
- Carlmont High School
- Castro Valley
- Concord High School
- Crystal Springs Uplands School
- Gunn High School
- Harker School
- Hillsdale High School
- Jefferson
- Lynnbrook
- Menlo School
- Menlo-Atherton High School
- Mills High School
- Mission San Jose High School (dropped out 2011, returning 2013)
- Mountain View
- Pinewood
- Sacred Heart
- San Mateo High School
- San Leandro High School
- Sequoia
- Serra
- Stuart Hall High School
- South San Francisco
- Summit
- Terra Nova High School (Pacifica)
- Westmoor
- Woodside

=== Past Participants ===
- Acalanes
- Aragon High School
- Burlingame High School - 2008 season
- Campolindo
- Capuchino High School
- Carondolet
- Clayton Valley
- De La Salle
- Evergreen Valley
- Gilroy
- Half Moon Bay
- Miramonte
- Monta Vista
- Novato
- Palo Alto High School
- Pescadero
- San Carlos
- Tamalpais
- Valley Christian
- Vintage
- Willow Glen
