= Peninsula Athletic League =

High school athletic conference in California

- PAL office (Northern California)
- Named after: San Francisco Peninsula
- Formation: 1996; 30 years ago
- Merger of: North Peninsula League (1996)
- Headquarters: San Mateo County Office of Education
- Location(s): 101 Twin Dolphin Drive; Redwood City, CA 94065
- Coordinates: 37.5258°N 122.2631°W
- Commissioner: Terry Stogner
- Parent organization: CIF Central Coast Section
- Website: www.smcoe.org/about/peninsula-athletic-league/

The Peninsula Athletic League (PAL) is a high school athletic conference in California, part of the CIF Central Coast Section of the California Interscholastic Federation. It comprises 17 high schools generally around San Mateo County, California. There are also nine smaller schools, designated supplemental members, of which four are located in Santa Clara County. The seventeen sports offered are divided into different divisions depending on the strength of the school's program.

== Sports ==
PAL offers contests in seventeen sports throughout the year during three seasons. Some schools do not participate in all sports.

Peninsula Athletic League Sports (Note: Availability of sports at different schools is taken from 2016-17 Commissioner's Cup results)
Season
Fall	Winter	Spring
Cross Country (XC)	Basketball (BB)	Badminton (BD) (Note: Not offered at Half Moon Bay or Oceana)
Football (FB) (Note: Not offered at Oceana or Westmoor)	Soccer (FS) (Note: Not offered for boys at Oceana)	Baseball (BS) (Note: Not offered at Oceana)
Golf for Girls (GOg) (Note: Not offered at Capuchino, Carlmont, Half Moon Bay, Jefferson, Oceana, Terra Nova, Westmoor, or Woodside)	Wrestling (WR) (Note: Not offered at Carlmont, Hillsdale, Oceana, or Westmoor)	Golf for Boys (GOb) (Note: Not offered at Jefferson, Oceana, or Westmoor)
Tennis for Girls (TNg) (Note: Not offered at Jefferson)		Lacrosse (LC) (Note: Boys. Not offered at Capuchino, El Camino, Half Moon Bay, Hillsdale, Jefferson, Mills, Oceana, San Mateo, South San Francisco, Terra Nova, Westmoor)
Volleyball for Girls (VBg) (Note: Not offered for girls at Oceana)		Softball (SB)
Water Polo (WP) (Note: Not offered at El Camino, Jefferson, Oceana, South San Francisco, or Westmoor)		Swimming (SW)
		Tennis for Boys (TNb) (Note: Not offered at Jefferson, South San Francisco, or Terra Nova)
Track and Field (TF)
Volleyball for Boys (VBb) (Note: Not offered for boys at Burlingame, El Camino, Half Moon Bay, Jefferson, Oceana, Sequoia, Terra Nova, Westmoor, Woodside)

== Members ==
=== Basic members ===
The seventeen basic member schools in the Peninsula Athletic League are drawn from five public school districts: Cabrillo Unified School District (serving Half Moon Bay and the ocean coast of the San Francisco Peninsula), Jefferson Union (serving Brisbane, Colma, Daly City, and Pacifica), San Mateo Union (serving Burlingame, Millbrae, San Bruno, and San Mateo), Sequoia Union (serving Atherton, Belmont, East Palo Alto, Ladera, San Carlos, Menlo Park, Portola Valley, Redwood City, and Woodside), and the South San Francisco Unified School District (serving South San Francisco and portions of Daly City and San Bruno).

Peninsula Athletic League Basic Member Schools
School	City	District	Sport and Division (Note: PAL has two divisions for most sports based on the strength of the school's program. In descending order of strength, the divisions are Bay (B) and Ocean (O). Some sports include a third, lower division, Lake (L).)														
School	City	District	XC (Note: Cross Country is offered for boys and girls at all schools.)	FB (Note: Football)	GO (Note: Golf)	TN (Note: Tennis)	VB (Note: Volleyball. For boys, volleyball only has a single division.)	WP (Note: Water Polo)	BB (Note: Basketball is divided geographically into North (N) and South (S) divisions.)	FS (Note: For girls soccer, the Ocean Division is further subdivided into a first flight (O1) and second flight (O2).)	WR (Note: Wrestling)	BD (Note: Badminton)	BS (Note: Baseball)	LC (Note: Lacrosse)	SB (Note: Softball)	SW (Note: Swimming)	TF (Note: Track & Field)
Aragon	San Mateo	SMUHSD	Y	B	B	B	B	Bg,Ob (Note: Bay for girls, Ocean for boys)	S	B	O	B	O	O	B	B	B
Burlingame	Burlingame	SMUHSD	Y	B	B	B	Bg (Note: Bay, offered for girls only)	B	S	B	B	B	B	O	B	B	B
Capuchino	San Bruno	SMUHSD	Y	L	O	O	O	O	S	Bg,Ob	B	O	B	—	B	O	O
Carlmont	Belmont	SUHSD	Y	L	Bb (Note: Bay, offered for boys only)	B	B	B	S	B	—	B	B	O	B	B	O
El Camino	South San Francisco	SSFUSD	Y	L	O	O	Og (Note: Ocean, offered for girls only)	—	N	O2	B	O	L	—	O	O	L
Half Moon Bay	Half Moon Bay	CUSD	Y	O	Ob (Note: Ocean, offered for boys only)	Bg,Ob	Bg	Og,Bb (Note: Ocean for girls, Bay for boys)	N	O1	B	—	O	—	B	O	O
Hillsdale	San Mateo	SMUHSD	Y	B	B	B	B	Og,Bb	S	Bg,Ob	—	O	B	—	B	B	O
Jefferson	Daly City	JUHSD	Y	L	—	—	Og	—	N	O2	—	O	L	—	O	O	L
Menlo-Atherton	Atherton	SUHSD	Y	B	B	B	B	B	S	B	O	O	O	B	O	B	B
Mills	Millbrae	SMUHSD	Y	L	Bg,Ob	Og,Bb	Og,Bb	O	S	O1	O	B	L	—	O	O	B
Oceana	Pacifica	JUHSD	Y	—	—	O	—	—	N	O2g	B	—	—	—	—	—	L
San Mateo	San Mateo	SMUHSD	Y	L	B	B	O	O	S	O1	O	B	O	—	O	B	L
Sequoia	Redwood City	SUHSD	Y	O	O	O	Bg	O	S	O1g,Bb	B	B	B	O	B	B	B
South San Francisco	South San Francisco	SSFUSD	Y	O	O	Og	O	—	N	O1g,Bb	O	B	O	—	O	O	L
Terra Nova	Pacifica	JUHSD	Y	B	Ob	Og	Bg	O	N	Bg,Ob	B	O	B	—	O	O	O
Westmoor	Daly City	JUHSD	Y	—	—	O	Og	—	N	O2g,Bb	—	B	L	—	—	O	B
Woodside	Woodside	SUHSD	Y	O	Bb	B	Og	B	S	B	O	O	B	O	B	B	O

=== Supplemental schools ===
The supplemental schools belong to the West Bay Athletic League. Supplemental members are elected by a two-thirds majority vote of principal basic PAL members and participate less than 50% of total sports offerings from PAL.

Peninsula Athletic League Supplemental Schools
School	City	Sport and Division (Note: PAL has two divisions for most sports based on the strength of the school's program. In descending order of strength, the divisions are Bay (B) and Ocean (O). Some sports include a third, lower division, Lake (L).)				
School	City	FB (Note: Football)	WP (Note: Water Polo)	BD (Note: Badminton)	BS (Note: Baseball)	LC (Note: Lacrosse)
Castilleja (Note: All-female student body)	Palo Alto	—	B	—	—	—
Crystal Springs Uplands	Hillsborough	—	—	O	L	—
Harker	San Jose	—	—	—	L	—
The King's Academy	Sunnyvale	O	—	—	O	—
Mercy HS	Burlingame	—	O	—	—	—
Menlo School	Atherton	O	B	—	O	B
Notre Dame	Belmont	—	B	—	—	—
Sacred Heart Prep	Atherton	B	—	—	B	B
Woodside Priory	Portola Valley	—	Ob (Note: Ocean, offered for boys only)	—	—	—
