= Crestmoor High School =

Coordinates: 37°36′45″N 122°25′39″W

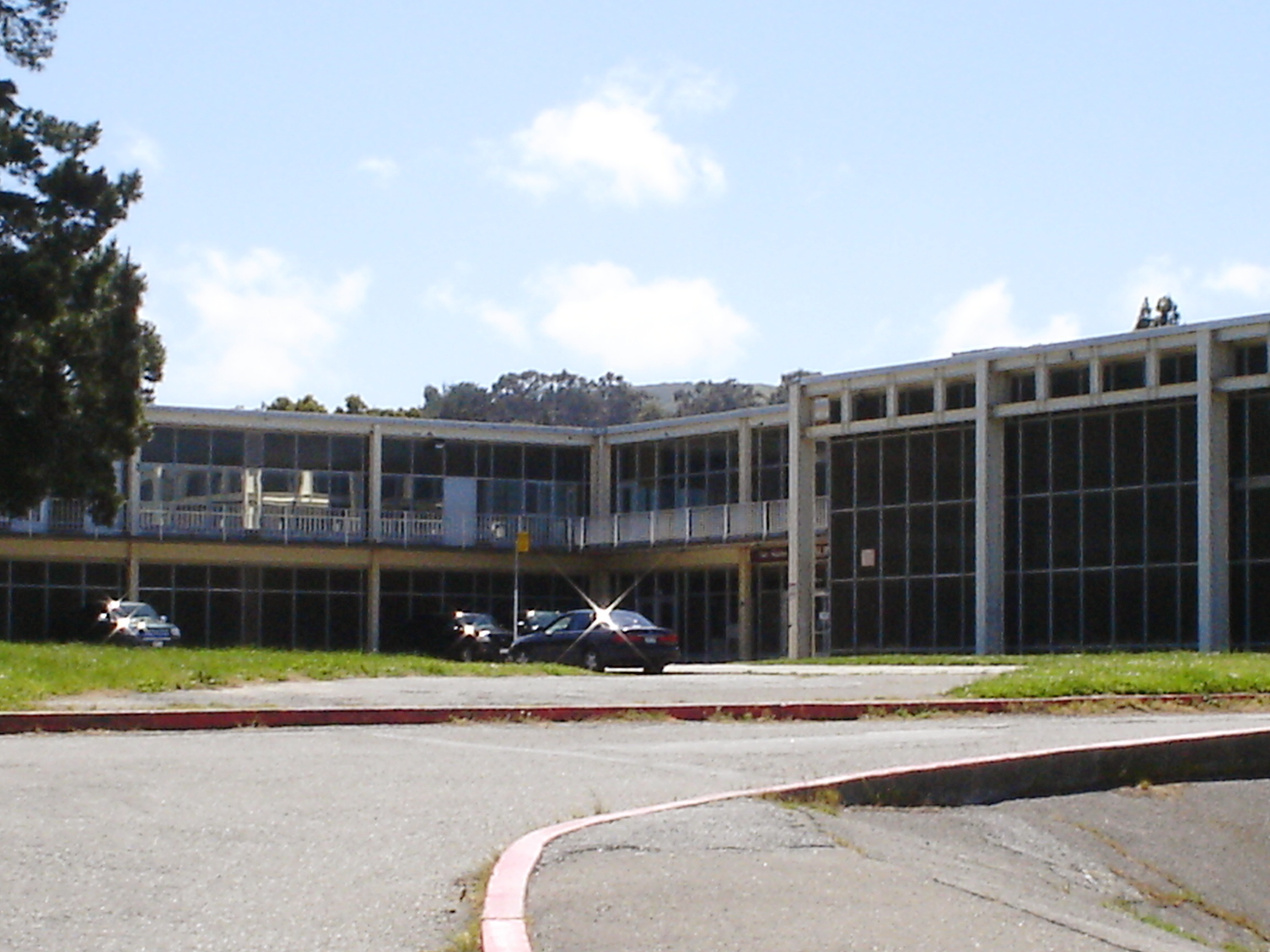
- Former facility in 2007
- San Bruno, California; United States

Information
- Type: public
- Established: 1962
- Status: closed
- School district: SMUHSD
- Campus: suburban

Crestmoor High School opened in San Bruno, California in September 1962 to relieve congestion at Capuchino High School and Mills High School. It was the seventh high school to be built by the San Mateo Union High School District, based in San Mateo, California. Construction began in 1960 on a graded plateau in the Crestmoor district of San Bruno and took about two years to complete. The school underwent recent construction demolition in Dec. of 2024, approximately. The buildings, which were similar in design to those of Aragon High School, Hillsdale High School, and Mills High School, were constructed mostly of steel and glass, featuring expansion systems to provide earthquake resistance. The school, and its similarly designed schools, have been designed in an architectural style described as "postwar techno-optimism". The school was closed in 1980.

In June 2024, SummerHill Homes LLC received approval to develop a new subdivision on the site, which will include housing and recreational areas.

The view from the school site takes in the East Bay and South San Francisco to San Mateo.

== Closing ==
Declining student enrollment in the San Mateo Union High School District prompted the school board to consider closing a school in the fall of 1980. The final choice came down to Burlingame High School or Crestmoor. In the vote, the board decided to close Crestmoor despite Crestmoor's having a larger enrollment than Burlingame and being a newer facility with lower operating and maintenance costs than several district schools. The 1,500-student facility was closed in 1980, relieving the school district of construction debt. The library was sold to the El Dorado Union High School District in 1980 and installed at Oak Ridge High School after being reduced by approximately 1/3 to 14,500 books due to duplication. Some of the buildings were later used for the district's continuation high school, Peninsula High School, and the campus also served as an overflow trial venue for a lawsuit filed by insurance companies in San Mateo County Superior Court against Shell Oil Company to cover the cost of cleaning up pesticide contamination at Rocky Mountain Arsenal in 1988.

The San Mateo Union High School District board decided that sale of the campus would help alleviate a major financial shortfall. The proposed sale of the campus was opposed by San Bruno residents. Until 2021, the facility housed San Mateo Union High School District's continuation/alternative high school, Peninsula High School; culminating a yearslong process, in 2020, San Mateo Union High School District officials agreed to sell the former Crestmoor High School campus in San Bruno to D.R. Horton for as much as $125 million. The sale closed in 2025 for $86 million.

== Notable alumni ==
- Paul Cayard, Class of 1977. Americas Cup Skipper. Elected to the Sailing World Hall of Fame 2002

=== Faculty ===
- John Christgau, Basketball coach
