= Design Tech High School =

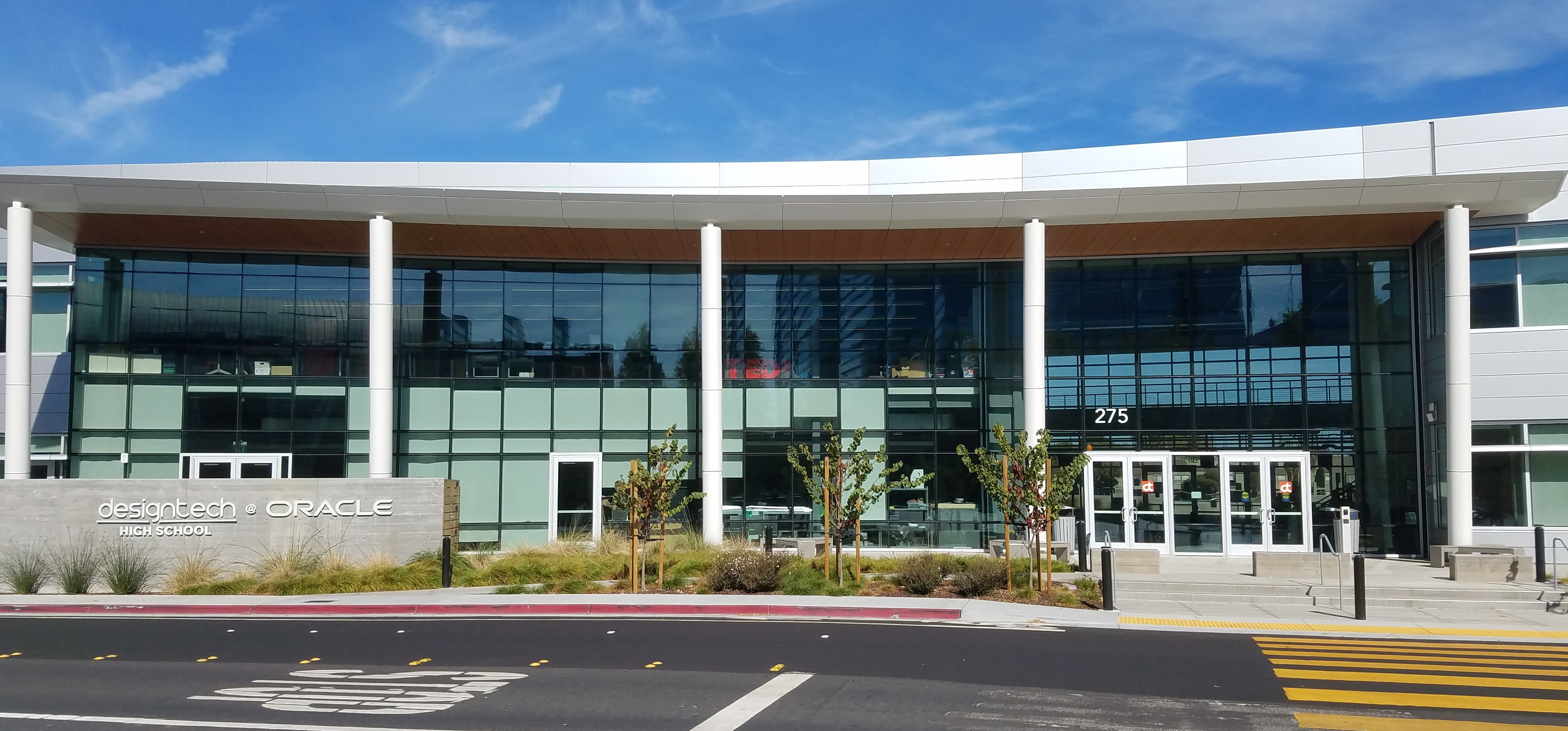
- Front entrance of Design Tech High School, October 2018

Location
- 275 Oracle Pkwy; Redwood City, California 94065; United States; 37.5326°N 122.2640°W

Information
- Other names: d.tech
- Type: Public charter high school
- Motto: We develop students who believe the world can be a better place, and they are the ones to make it happen.
- Established: 2014
- Founders: Ken Montgomery and Nicole Cerra
- Status: Open
- School district: San Mateo Union High School District
- NCES District ID: 0634980
- Director: Ken Montgomery
- Staff: 54
- Grades: 9 to 12
- Gender: Co-ed
- Enrollment: 562 (as of 2021-2022)
- Campus type: Corporate
- Colors: Orange , Gray and White
- Mascot: Official: Dragon Spiritual: Koi
- Newspaper: The Dragon
- Yearbook: The Flame
- Website: designtechhighschool.org

Design Tech High School, commonly referred to as d.tech, is a public charter high school in the San Francisco Bay Area. The school is located on the Oracle Corporation campus in Redwood City, California, and is part of the San Mateo Union High School District. Founded in 2014, the school has 567 students (as of December 2024) and focuses on implementing technology, self-direction, and the process of design thinking into its curriculum. A second Design Tech school in Rancho Cordova, California was scheduled to open for the 2023-2024 school year. This new campus has closed as of May 1.

== History ==
The petition that led to the creation of Design Tech was filed with the San Mateo Union High School District (SMUHSD) on September 12, 2013; SMUHSD's board of trustees unanimously accepted the petition in November. Design Tech was founded in 2014 by a group of four educators: Nicole Cerra, Ken Montgomery, Christy Knott, and Wendy Little, along with community members Sandra Feder, Ron Drabkin, Betsy Corcoran and David Little. Montgomery, who had previously been the Assistant Principal of Capuchino High School, was inspired by his studies at Stanford, where he attended classes at the Stanford d.school. The group began planning of the school and opened in time for the 2014–2015 school year, with a temporary campus in a hallway at Mills High School in Millbrae, California; students designed the space as their first assignments.

Students and parents of Mills were unhappy with d.tech's presence. The next school year, d.tech migrated to a former auto body shop on Rollins Road in an industrial area of Burlingame, leading to the adoption as unofficial school mascot of the koi, a fish with a reputation for growing to fill any container. During that school year, d.tech was offered the opportunity to design and build a building on a waterfront plot on the Oracle campus in Redwood City. Throughout the year, students and faculty met with Oracle's architectural team to help design the new building, and it opened in January 2018.

The first class of d.tech graduated in 2018.

At the start of the 2022-23 school year, Design Tech implemented Yondr Pouches and an e-hall pass system, both of which were highly unpopular with students. A lunchtime protest of the new policies and other actions that students viewed as unfair resulted in suspensions and subsequent expulsion hearings for more than 13 students. The school and its administration have been criticized for their handling of the situation. The school has also received criticism for not reflecting the make-up of the district as a whole in its enrollment and for the involvement of Oracle.

== Campus ==
=== Mills High School ===
Design Tech's first campus was at Mills High School in Millbrae, California. In spring 2014 SMUHSD offered six 960 ft^{2} (89 m^{2}) classrooms at Mills essentially rent-free, based on the requirements of Proposition 39, which mandates that charter schools be offered facilities "reasonably equivalent" to public schools. School leaders had initially requested space at Burlingame High School, but district officials opined that there was no space available at BHS. Intended to be a temporary campus, d.tech was located within a single hallway at Mills. In the first two weeks of school at the Mills campus, instead of attending academic classes, students were tasked with designing their classroom layouts. They were also required to take a field trip on the second day of school due to Mills' first day of school. However, students and parents of Mills complained about the presence of d.tech on their campus, capped by a contentious SMUHSD Board of Trustees meeting where State Senator Jerry Hill declared he would ask a civil grand jury to investigate the Board's responsiveness to citizens, and d.tech began planning their relocation within a few months.

d.tech campus location history
1 Mills High School
2 Rollins campus
3 Oracle campus

=== Rollins Road ===
Design Tech began to rent a large warehouse, previously an auto-body repair school, to use as their campus. It was located in Millbrae as well, on Rollins Road, adjacent to US Highway 101. The students began to affectionately call this campus "Rollins", after the road it was located on. The main area of the building was the "Hangar"; a large, open, concrete-floored space. Classrooms in the Hangar were fluid; while some students often complained about distracting noise during their classes, as there were no walls or doors to stop sound or people from entering classrooms, other students felt that there was a special sense of community in this open space that brought them all closer together and could not be replicated in another way. The Rollins Road campus included the school's first iteration of the Design Realization Garage, which students used to build projects such as wheelchair-accessible ramps, skateboard racks, and a hexagonal bench that was eventually used as seating for meetings and snack breaks. Despite the limited space of the campus and its lack of school-related uses, students were quick to use the often empty parking lot for basketball, football, and other physical activities.

=== Oracle ===
Soon after d.tech's move to Rollins, the Oracle Education Foundation announced plans to build a $43 million, 64,000 sq ft (5946 m2) campus for d.tech on a 2.5-acre site at the company's then headquarters in Redwood Shores. The building was designed with input from students and includes a two-story 8,000-square-foot Design Realization Garage. Oracle currently leases the building to d.tech for $1 per year, and offers students two-week courses and unpaid internships three times a year through the Oracle Education Foundation.

== Awards and recognition ==
The school is accredited by the Western Association of Schools and Colleges. The current Design Tech High School campus building at Oracle was built to LEED Gold specifications and won the Green Building Award from Sustainable San Mateo County and Best Education Project from both Silicon Valley Business Journal and PCBS as a part of their 2018 Gold Nugget Awards.

== Athletics ==
Design Tech offers students the chance to create sports teams based on interest. The first sport introduced to the school was Basketball during the school's inaugural year. Since the inaugural year, the school has expanded to six sports for both Boys and Girls consisting of girls volleyball, cross country, basketball, soccer, boys baseball, girls softball, swimming, track, and sailing. In the 2019–2020 school year, girls volleyball, cross country, and boys basketball have qualified for the CCS playoffs.

== Design Tech Math Club ==
The Design Tech Math Club is a student-led chapter of Mu Alpha Theta.

The club hosts three recurring events for middle school students: Design Tech Puzzle Night, which features interactive puzzle stations; the five-day online Design Tech Problem of the Day Challenge; and the annual Design Tech Math Tournament.

The Design Tech Math Tournament features two subject rounds selected from algebra, geometry, discrete mathematics, and a sixth-grade test, followed by team and sequence rounds. The sequence round uses a format similar to the Berkeley Math Tournament's Guts Round. The tournament also includes an activities session with guest speakers; Stanford mathematician Ciprian Manolescu gave a talk on knot theory in 2026.

== Robotics ==
The Design Tech High School FRC team, 5940 BREAD, was founded in the 2015-2016 FIRST season.

The team went to the World Championships in their first season via the Rookie All-Star award. In the 2021-2022 season, the team won the Monterey Bay Regional, qualifying them to compete at the World Championships in Houston, Texas. Team 5940 ranked 3rd, winning the Roebling Division at the World Championship qualifying them for the Einstein rounds where they went 1-4-0. Additionally, they won the entrepreneurship award for an outstanding business plan and organizational structure. In the 2022–2023 season, the team rebranded from red to brown in order to better suit a Bread theme. That season, they won the Monterey Bay Regional again and qualified for the World Championships, where they ranked 1st and were division finalists. During the 2023-2024 season, they won the San Francisco and Central Valley Regionals, which qualified them for the World Championship. At Champs, they ranked 6th in the Hopper Division and got eliminated in round 3 of the elimination bracket.

== Admissions ==
Design Tech applicants are admitted to the school based on a lottery system, per California law. The lottery gives preference to siblings and to students in the San Mateo and Sequoia High School districts.

== Leadership ==
Ken Montgomery has been executive director since 2014. As of the 2023–24 school year, new school leadership was hired with Margarita Contreras as the new school director. As of the 2026-2027 school year, Dr. Ken Montgomery has taken back the position as school director again.

== Enrollment ==
Design Tech High School Enrollment Statistics
Year	Total	African American	American Indian or Alaska Native	Asian	Filipino	Hispanic or Latino	Pacific Islander	White	Two or More Races	Not Reported	Male	Female	Non-binary
2014–15	136; 100%	6; 4.4%	0; 0.0%	37; 27.2%	5; 3.7%	25; 18.4%	2; 1.5%	61; 44.9%	0; 0.0%	0; 0.0%	84; 61.8%	52; 38.2%	--
2015–16	260; 100%	2; 0.8%	0; 0.0%	61; 23.5%	10; 3.8%	52; 20.0%	2; 0.8%	105; 40.4%	26; 10.0%	2; 0.8%	159; 61.2%	101; 38.8%	--
2016–17	414; 100%	2; 0.5%	1; 0.2%	90; 21.7%	10; 2.4%	69; 16.7%	2; 0.5%	185; 44.7%	46; 11.1%	9; 2.2%	256; 61.8%	158; 38.2%	--
2017–18	552; 100%	2; 0.4%	0; 0.0%	119; 21.6%	16; 2.9%	82; 14.9%	7; 1.3%	255; 46.2%	62; 11.2%	9; 1.6%	328; 59.4%	224; 40.6%	--
2018–19	555; 100%	2; 0.4%	0; 0.0%	111; 20.0%	14; 2.5%	73; 13.2%	5; 0.9%	275; 49.5%	71; 12.8%	4; 0.7%	325; 58.6%	230; 41.4%	--
2019-20	571; 100%	3; 0.5%	0 0.0%	115 20.1%	16 2.8%	76 13.3%	4 0.7%	282 49.4%	73 12.8%	2 0.4%	338 59.2%	233 40.8%	--
2020-21	557; 100%	4 0.7%	0 0.0%	132 23.7%	21 3.8%	75 13.5%	6 1.1%	250 44.9%	69 12.4%	0 0.0%	329 59.1%	228 40.9%	--
2021-22	562; 100%	5 0.9%	0 0.0%	137 24.4%	21 3.7%	71 12.6%	2 0.4%	245 43.6%	81 14.4%	0 0.0%	347 61.7%	211 37.5%	4 0.7%

N.B.: Non-binary student data not available prior to the 2021-22 school year.
