= Early Academic Outreach Program =

EAOP logo

The Early Academic Outreach Program (EAOP) was established in 1976 by the University of California (UC) in response to the California State Legislatures' recommendation to expand post-secondary opportunities to every Californian student, including those who are first-generation, socio-economically disadvantaged, and English-language learners. As UC's largest academic preparation program, EAOP assists middle and high school students with academic preparation, admissions and financial aid requirements for higher education.

The program designs and provides services for the academic development of foster students, and deliver these services in partnership with other academic preparation programs, schools, other higher education institutes and community/industry partners.

The goal of the program to increase access for educationally disadvantaged students to the University of California is grounded in the philosophy that preparing for success in college is not simply one of many options for young people; it is their right.

== Scope ==
EAOP is the largest UC academic preparation program. The program has offices located on every UC campus and the campuses serve schools within their geographic regions. In the 2006–07 academic year, EAOP served over 42,492 students in the cohort program alone. That year, EAOP served 259 high schools and 131 middle schools in both cohort and whole-school partner models. EAOP further reached over 9,000 families in workshops, college visits and family events.

== Student population ==
The purpose of EAOP is to increase the number of students who have the opportunity to achieve a post-secondary education.

Populations with lower college-going rates	EAOP population
Low API schools	79% of the schools EAOP serves are in the five lowest API deciles.
Low-income students	According to census tract data, 71% of EAOP schools are in communities with median family incomes of less than $50,000, compared to about 47% of high schools statewide. In Sacramento County, for example, the vast majority of EAOP students live in areas where the household income is $52,000 or less.
Underrepresented at UC	Most students in EAOP are from groups underrepresented at the University of California, 69%, a rate that is very close to the percentage of underrepresented students in the schools served by the programs.
EAOP alumni at UC	At the University of California, three-quarters of freshmen attended the state's highest-performing high schools, those with an API of 6-10. Only one quarter of freshmen at UC attended schools with an API of 1–5. By comparison, three quarters of EAOP alumni (freshmen) at the University of California attended schools with an API of 1–5.

== Outcomes ==
Research shows that EAOP students are more prepared for college than students who do not participate in the program. Independent academic studies and evaluations conducted for California's state legislature show that EAOP students surpass students statewide in terms of coursework and exam completion, UC eligibility, college enrollment and college persistence. For example:

College eligibility/attendance indicator	EAOP outcome
California's public university course requirements	EAOP students complete the 'A-G' course requirements at twice the rate of students statewide.
Entrance exams	In schools with an API of 1 and 2, EAOP students took the SAT/ACT at twice the rate of non-EAOP students (61% compared to 29%).
College eligibility	The college eligibility rate for EAOP students is more than two and a half times that of students in California statewide, 34% for EAOP students compared to 14.4% statewide.
College attendance (public colleges in California)	More than 2/3 of EAOP alumni attend a California public college, significantly higher than the statewide rate of less than half.
College enrollment (all colleges)	Seventy-two percent of EAOP Students enroll in college the first year after high school.
