= Peninsula High School (San Mateo County, California) =

Location
- 860 Hinckley Road; Burlingame, California; United States; 37.598°N 122.369°W

Information
- Type: Public
- Established: July 1980
- School district: San Mateo Union High School District
- Principal: Dr. Ron Campana
- Faculty: 12.56 (on FTE basis)
- Grades: 9 to 12
- Enrollment: 186 (2023-24)
- Student to teacher ratio: 14.81
- Mascot: Puma
- Website: phs.smuhsd.org

Peninsula High School (PHS) is a public continuation high school in Burlingame, California, United States. Before moving to Burlingame in 2021, it used the former Crestmoor High School campus in San Bruno, California. It is part of the San Mateo Union High School District (SMUHSD). Its main purpose is to aid students who are behind in credits that are necessary for graduation.

== History ==
PHS opened as the continuation high school for SMUHSD in July 1980. Peninsula first received educational accreditation in 2001 through the Western Association of Schools and Colleges and has maintained its accreditation since then.

It reopened as Peninsula Alternative High School in August 2013 as its curriculum had gradually become more similar to an alternative high school, allowing students to compete in athletics for their "home" high school while attending classes at Peninsula. At this time, most at-risk students were referred to the Court and Community School operated by the San Mateo County Office of Education. In 2017, PHS returned to its original role as a continuation high school for the 2017–18 academic year.

Peninsula moved to its campus in Burlingame in February 2021. Prior to that, since the early 1990s, it had operated from the former Crestmoor High School campus at 300 Piedmont Avenue in San Bruno.

== Curriculum ==
All graduate must complete at least 220 credits of work in English (40), mathematics (30), social science (35), physical education (20), science (20), fine and performing arts (10), health (5), and electives (60).

The school has partnered with a local business, Culinary Twist, to construct packaging for its products.

== Demographics ==
2011-2012

- 261 students: 161 male (61.7%), 100 female (38.3%)

Hispanic	White	Pacific Islander	Asian	Filipino	Two or more races	African American	American Indian	Not reported
170	39	17	13	7	7	4	0	4
65.1%	14.9%	6.5%	5%	2.7%	2.7%	1.5%	0%	1.5%

As of 2015, the majority of the students attending Peninsula used to attend San Mateo High School.

== Standardized testing ==
2012 Academic Performance Index
2009 base API	2012 growth API	Growth in the API from 2009 to 2012
506	618	112

== On-campus resources ==
The Child Development Center is Peninsula's on-campus day care center. This allows teen parents who are SMUHSD residents to receive an education and earn a high school diploma.

== See also ==
- San Mateo County high schools
