= Terra Nova High School (California) =

Public high school in California, United States

Coordinates: 37.594244°N 122.474974°W

- 1450 Terra Nova Boulevard; Pacifica, California 94044

Information
- Type: Public High School
- Motto: Home of Scholars and Champions
- Established: 1961
- School district: Jefferson Union High School District
- Principal: Megan Carey
- Teaching staff: 38.74 (FTE)
- Enrollment: 697 (2023–2024)
- Student to teacher ratio: 17.99
- Campus: Suburban
- Colors: Black and Yellow
- Team name: Tigers
- Website: Official website

Terra Nova High School (sometimes abbreviated to simply TN) is an American public high school in Pacifica in San Mateo County, California, United States. It serves grades 9 through 12 as part of the Jefferson Union High School District.

== History ==
Terra Nova High School was established in 1961 to serve the growing population in the Linda Mar district of southern Pacifica. Students attended from Vallemar, Rockaway Beach, Mori Point, Fairway, Sharp Park and Pacific Manor districts until Oceana High School was completed the following year.

The 2007 National Book Award finalist Story of a Girl is set at Terra Nova.

== Campus ==
The original buildings and campus were designed by Mark Falk & Corwin Booth (of Falk & Booth). The main building originally had only two stories when the school opened in 1961. Portables were added to the rear of the school campus to accommodate the increase in students and need for more classrooms. A major facilities remodel was completed in 1998, and construction of a 400+ seat theater and a new science building began in early 2010 and was completed in 2012.

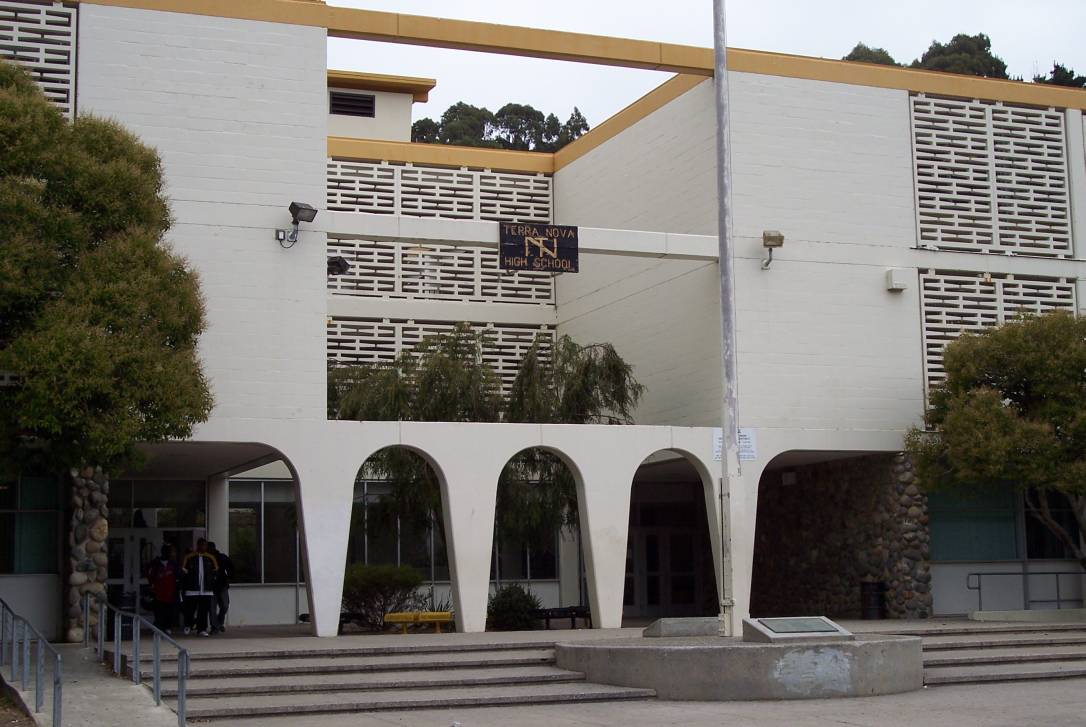
Entrance to the high school

== Demographics ==
White	Latino	Asian	African American	Pacific Islander	American Indian	Two or more races
38%	30%	14%	2%	2%	0.4%	13%

According to U.S. News & World Report, 62% of Terra Nova's student body is "of color," with 22% of the student body coming from economically disadvantaged households, determined by student eligibility for California's Reduced-price meal program.

== Academics ==
=== Curriculum ===
Terra Nova offers Advanced Placement courses in US History, European History, Chemistry, Biology, Environmental Science, US Government, Language and Composition, Literature, Studio Art, Music Theory, and Calculus AB.

=== Standardized testing ===
In 2011, Terra Nova scored an API of 801, the sixth highest in San Mateo County. By 2013, the last year on record, the school had scored 792, the second highest in the Jefferson Union school district.

The state of California replaced the API system with the California School Dashboard system in 2017, in order to provide "a fuller picture of how districts and schools are addressing the needs of their students while also identifying the specific strengths and areas in need of improvement."

For the school year 2018–2019, Terra Nova scored 6.3 points above the state average in English Language Arts, but 40.4 points below standard in Math. It ranked above average for both Campus Climate - with an annual suspension rate of 5.6% - and Academic Engagement - with a graduation rate (measured by the percentage who received a high school diploma within 4–5 years of entering 9th grade or completed their graduation requirements at an alternative school) of 94.7%.

SAT Scores for 2013–2014
	Critical Reading average	Math average	Writing average
Terra Nova High School	538	553	524
Jefferson Union District	503	536	500
San Mateo County	546	576	548
Statewide	492	506	489

== Extracurricular activities ==
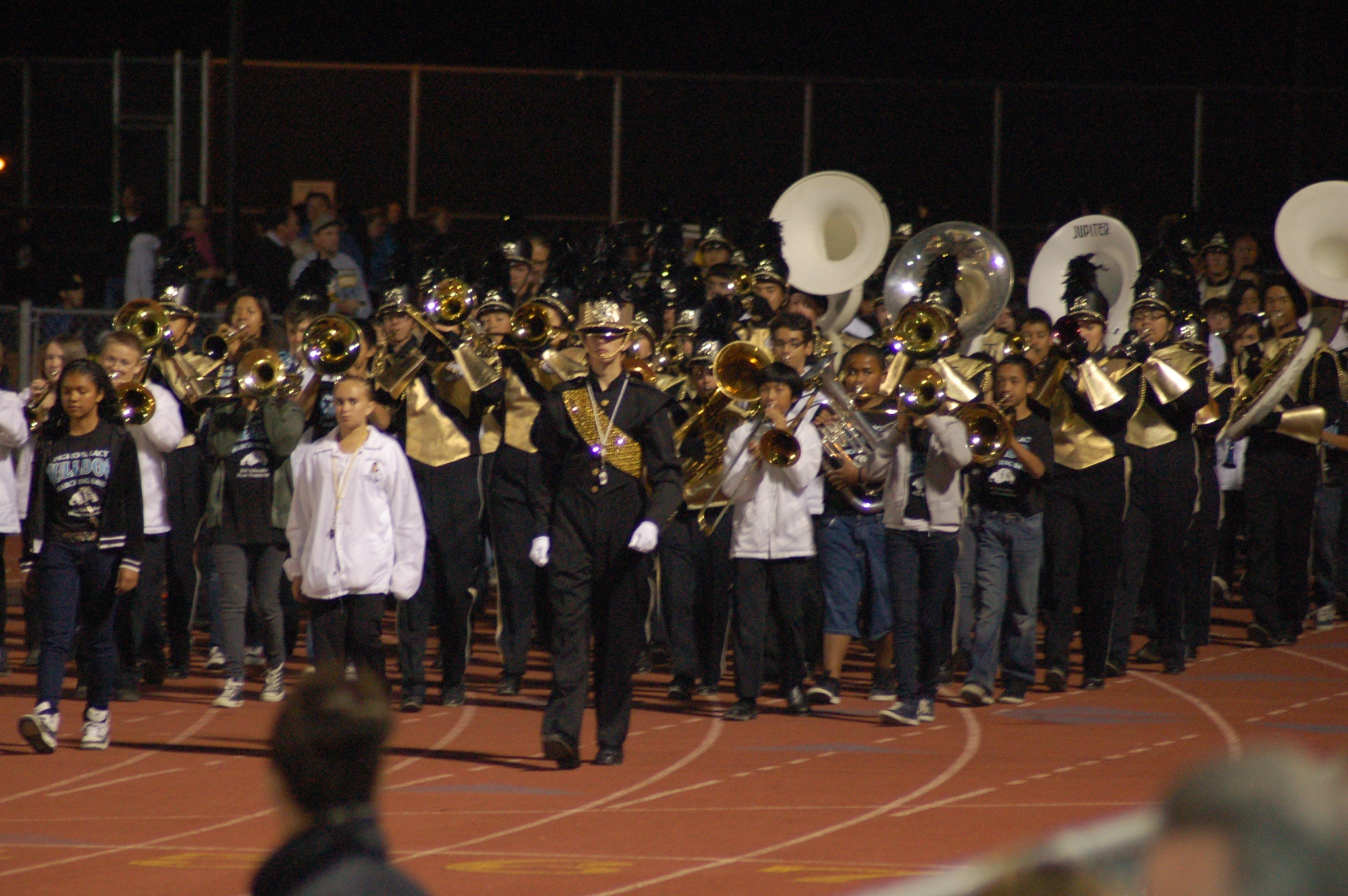
All-School Marching Band walking into Tiger Stadium in 2010.

The school's drama department stages fall and spring productions, often in collaboration with the local Pacifica Spindrift Players.

Students publish the Terra Nova Times, a school newspaper recognized by the Peninsula Press Club.

Terra Nova has also participated in the Bay Area's Quiz Kids show since its debut.

In athletics, Terra Nova offers a wide variety of sports, including football, baseball, cheer leading, badminton, cross country, tennis, track and field, water polo, swimming, soccer, basketball, volleyball, and wrestling. The football program has won multiple Central Coast Section championships.

== Notable alumni ==
- Mike Buskey, Class of 1967, former Major League Baseball player for Philadelphia Phillies
- Keith Hernandez, attended during his freshman year in 1967-1968 but transferred to nearby Capuchino High School for the remainder of his high school years; Major League Baseball first baseman for the St. Louis Cardinals and New York Mets
- Bob McClure, Class of 1970, Major League Baseball relief pitcher for seven teams, most prominently the Milwaukee Brewers
- Rob Schneider, Class of 1982, actor, comedian, and screenwriter
- Sara Zarr, Class of 1988, writer
- Mike Lockwood, Class of 1989, professional Wrestler
- Greg Reynolds, Class of 2003, the Colorado Rockies' No. 1 draft choice in 2006 (Major League Baseball), and Rockies starting pitcher in the 2008 season
- Eugene Gu, Class of 2004, Physician-scientist and CEO of the Ganogen Research Institute
- Simon Enciso, Class of 2009, Basketball player
- Anthony Gordon, Class of 2015, Quarterback for the Denver Broncos formerly for Washington State University

== See also ==
- San Mateo County high schools
