= Accountability Act =

Accountability Act may refer to a number of different pieces of legislation:

== Canada ==
- Federal Accountability Act

== United States ==
- Syria Accountability Act
- Darfur Peace and Accountability Act
- Health Insurance Portability and Accountability Act
- Public Schools Accountability Act of California
