= San Mateo Union High School District =

School district in California

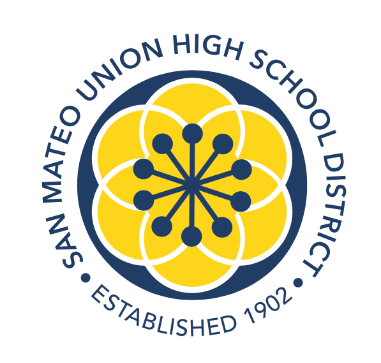

Location
- 650 North Delaware Street; San Mateo, CA 94401-1732 US-CA United States

District information
- Type: Public
- Motto: A Commitment to Quality Education for a Better Future.
- Grades: 9-12
- Established: 1902
- President: Peter H. Hanley
- Vice-president: Linda Lees Dwyer
- Superintendent: Randall Booker
- Accreditations: Western Association of Schools and Colleges; California Department of Education
- Schools: 7
- Budget: $112 million
- NCES District ID: 0634980

Students and staff
- Students: 9,093 (2021-2022)
- Teachers: 471
- Staff: 342
- Athletic conference: Peninsula Athletic League

Other information
- Website: www.smuhsd.org

The San Mateo Union High School District (SMUHSD) is a high school district headquartered in San Mateo, California that serves most of San Mateo County. The district serves the cities of San Mateo, Foster City, Hillsborough, San Bruno, Millbrae, and Burlingame.

== Schools ==
SMUHSD serves San Francisco Bay-side cities in the central part of San Mateo County; northern and southern cities are served by the Jefferson Union High School District / South San Francisco Unified School District and Sequoia Union High School District, respectively. High school districts on the Pacific coast side of San Mateo County include Cabrillo Unified School District and La Honda-Pescadero Unified School District.

The district consists of six public high schools, one continuation high school, one alternative high school (a "college high school"), one adult school, and one charter school in San Bruno, Millbrae, Burlingame, and San Mateo. The district serves a total population of 8,400 students with a staff of more than 900 employees; the District Adult School has an additional 10,000 part-time students. The public schools participate in the Peninsula Athletic League.

The oldest high school in San Mateo County is Sequoia High School in Redwood City. It was founded in 1895. The next oldest school in the county is San Mateo High School, which opened in 1902. Within the district, SMHS was followed by Burlingame High School, which opened in the early 1920s, and then Capuchino High School in San Bruno in 1950. The district added more public high schools in the mid-50s and early 1960s as the population of the Peninsula grew: Hillsdale High School (1955) and Aragon High School (1961) in San Mateo, Mills High School (1958) in Millbrae, and Crestmoor High School (1962) in San Bruno. Due to declining enrollment, Crestmoor was closed in 1980; some of the buildings were later used for Peninsula High School, a continuation school. SMUHSD sold the Crestmoor campus in 2025 and moved Peninsula to Burlingame.

The San Mateo Middle College High School is an alternative education program, begun in 1998, which is attended by 35 juniors and 35 seniors selected from high schools in the district. These students take both high school and college courses at College of San Mateo.

The San Mateo Adult School is an adult school with an annual enrollment of over 14,000 whose mission is to "develop skilled workers, strong families, and successful communities by offering opportunities to learn at every stage of adult life."

Design Tech High School (also known as 'd.tech') is a charter school with open enrollment for all students in California which opened in 2014; the first class graduated in 2018. Enrollment is limited to 150 incoming freshmen (Grade 9); transfers for sophomores (Grade 10) are limited, and no transfers are available for juniors and seniors (Grades 11 and 12, respectively). If applicants exceed capacity, a lottery is held to determine enrollment. Oracle Corporation announced in 2015 that it would build a public high school building for d.tech on its campus in Redwood Shores; the new $43 million building was completed in late 2017, replacing the schools initial space (a hallway at Mills High School) and interim campus (at 1800 Rollins Road in Burlingame). Students moved into the new building in January 2018.

List of San Mateo Union High School District Schools
Name	Year	Address	City	Notes	Image
Aragon	1961	900 Alameda de las Pulgas	San Mateo	In 2025 to 2026, new rows of operational solar panels built above the main student parking lot were completed.	
Burlingame	c.1920	1 Mangini Way	Burlingame	For 2013, it was ranked 280th in Newsweek's Top 2,000 Public High Schools, 471st nationally by U.S. News & World Report and 490th by The Washington Post's ranking of "America's Most Challenging High Schools."	
Capuchino	1950	1501 Magnolia Ave	San Bruno	In the 1990s, Capuchino's girls' softball team won five consecutive Central Coast Section (CCS) Championships (1993–1997)	
Hillsdale	1955	3115 Del Monte St	San Mateo	When it opened in 1955, Hillsdale High School was awarded the School Design Award from the American Institute of Architects.	
Mills	1958	400 Murchison Dr	Millbrae	In 2015, it was ranked the 225th best public high school in the country by Newsweek.	
Peninsula	1980	860 Hinckley Rd	Burlingame	Relocated to Burlingame in 2021. Previously located on the former campus of Crestmoor High School (300 Piedmont Ave, San Bruno)	
San Mateo	1902	506 N. Delaware St	San Mateo	The school earned a Guinness World Record in 2005 for collecting 372,000 pounds (168,736 kg) of food from the local community for its annual canned food drive.	
Adult School	1917	789 E. Poplar Ave	San Mateo	Provides education for traditionally underserved communities.	
Middle College	1998	1700 W. Hillsdale Blvd	San Mateo	Concurrent enrollment for up to 35 juniors and 35 seniors earning college credits at College of San Mateo while attending high school courses.	
Design Tech	2014	275 Oracle Pkwy	Redwood City	'd.tech' is a charter school that relocated to a new building in Redwood City in January 2018	

== Statistics ==
=== Demographics ===
San Mateo Union High School District Demographics
Year	Total	African American	American Indian or Alaska Native	Asian	Filipino	Hispanic or Latino	Pacific Islander	White	Two or More Races	Not Reported	Male	Female
2011–12	8,247	130	6	1,780	422	2,494	219	2,443	739	14	4,144	4,103
2011–12	8,247	1.6%	0.1%	21.6%	5.1%	30.2%	2.7%	29.6%	9%	0.2%	50.2%	49.8%
2014–15	8,321	100	10	1,832	496	2,516	216	2,482	664	5	4,279	4,042
2014–15	8,321	1.2%	0.1%	22%	6%	30.2%	2.6%	29.8%	8%	0.1%	51.4%	48.6%
2015–16	8,626	86	15	1,931	533	2,589	213	2,530	727	2	4,480	4,146
2015–16	8,626	1%	0.2%	22.4%	6.2%	30%	2.5%	29.3%	8.4%	0%	51.9%	48.1%
2016–17	9,104	87	19	1,976	551	2,847	213	2,634	768	9	4,714	4,290
2016–17	9,104	1%	0.2%	21.7%	6.1%	31.3%	2.3%	28.9%	8.4%	0.1%	51.8%	47.1%
2017–18	9,484	75	19	2,089	547	2,971	214	2,702	856	11	4,933	4,551
2017–18	9,484	0.8%	0.2%	22%	5.8%	31.3%	2.3%	28.5%	9%	0.1%	52%	48%
2021–22	9,655	77	9	2,215	511	3,093	177	2,620	953		4,984	4,657

=== Standardized testing ===
SAT 1 Scores for 2010–2011
	Critical Reading Average	Math Average	Writing Average
District	539	571	546
Statewide	495	513	494

== Board of trustees ==
The San Mateo Union High School District is governed by a five-member board of trustees, whose members are elected by voters residing in the district to serve up to two four-year terms. The Board is responsible for establishing educational goals and standards, approving curriculum and the school district budget, and appoints a superintendent to manage day-to-day administration.

The current trustees are Peter Hanley, Linda Lees Dwyer, Greg Land, Marc Friedman, and Robert Griffin. Former Board President Dave Pine was elected to the District 1 seat on the San Mateo County Board of Supervisors, replacing Mark Church in an all-mail special election which ended on May 3, 2011.

== Controversy ==
The district instituted a "late start" policy starting in the 2017–2018 academic year. While Thursdays ended earlier in previous years (1:45 pm as opposed to 3:15 pm), the late start made it so that Thursdays would start at 9:30, as opposed to the usual 8:00 am and would then end at 3:15 pm. This was controversial, as not all students could take advantage of the late start, as it would interfere with their driving schedule. Additionally, the late start, or more specifically the later end, interfered with many after-school programs.
