= Christgau (disambiguation) =

Robert Christgau (born 1942) is an American essayist and music critic.

Christgau may also refer to:

== People ==
- John Christgau (1934–2018), American author and basketball coach
- Victor Christgau (1894–1991), American politician from Minnesota

== Books ==
- Christgau's Record Guide: Rock Albums of the Seventies, a music reference book by Robert Christgau
  - Christgau's Record Guide: The '80s, the second book in the series
    - Christgau's Consumer Guide: Albums of the '90s, the third book in the series
