= Neal Dahlen =

American football executive (1940–2026)

- Dahlen c. 2019

Personal information
- Born: April 13, 1940; Spokane, Washington
- Died: February 15, 2026 (aged 85); Aurora, Colorado

Career information
- High school: Capuchino
- College: San Jose State

Career history
- San Francisco 49ers (1979–1995); Denver Broncos (1996–2003)
- Executive profile at Pro Football Reference

Neal Dahlen (April 13, 1940 – February 15, 2026) was an American football administrator, who worked for San Francisco 49ers (1979–1996), and the Denver Broncos (1996–2003), and was general manager of the Broncos from 1999 to January 2002.

Dahlen's seven Super Bowl rings are tied with Tom Brady for the second most in NFL history, only trailing Bill Belichick by one. He earned five with the 49ers, and two during his time at the Broncos.

== Life and career ==
Dahlen was born on April 13, 1940. (Note: 1939 or 1940 (age 86–87) and 1940 or 1941 (age 85–86) show that he must have been born in 1940 for both to be true.) He attended Capuchino High School in San Bruno, California. He then played quarterback at San Jose State University, where he graduated from in 1963 (and earned a master's in 1964). He then coached baseball and football at Hillsdale High School in San Mateo, as well as at the College of San Mateo.

He started working part-time for the 49ers in 1979, and earned increasing administrative responsibilities. He moved to Denver in 1996 to become director of player personnel, and later was named general manager in 1999. Ted Sundquist replaced him in early 2002, and Dahlen became the team's director of football administration until he retired the following year.

Dahlen died on February 15, 2026, at the age of 85.
