= Peninsula High School =

Peninsula High School may mean:

- Peninsula High School (Washington), in Purdy, north of the city of Gig Harbor, Washington, USA
- Peninsula High School (San Mateo County, California), in San Mateo County, formerly in San Bruno and now in Burlingame, California, USA
- Palos Verdes Peninsula High School, in Rolling Hills Estates, California, USA
