= Half Moon Bay High School =

Location
- 1 Lewis Foster Dr; Half Moon Bay, San Mateo County, California 94019; United States; 37.4735°N 122.428°W

Information
- Type: Public
- Opened: 1909
- School district: Cabrillo Unified School District
- Principal: Andrew Boysen
- Teaching staff: 50.86 (FTE)
- Grades: 9-12
- Enrollment: 987 (2023-2024)
- Student to teacher ratio: 19.41
- Colors: Orange, Black, White
- Athletics conference: CIF Central Coast Section
- Mascot: Cougar
- Yearbook: Las Olas
- Website: hmbhs.cabrillo.k12.ca.us

Half Moon Bay High School is an American public high school located in Half Moon Bay, in San Mateo County, California. It is part of the Cabrillo Unified School District.

== History ==
Half Moon Bay High School was founded in August 1909 under the leadership of the school's first principal, Mr. Anderson. Fourteen students registered for classes on the opening day, of whom seven graduated at the school's first commencement in 1912.

== Demographics ==
White	Latino	Asian	African American	Pacific Islander	American Indian	Two or More Races
49%	44%	4%	1%	0.1%	0.4%	3%

According to U.S. News & World Report, 51% of Half Moon Bay High School's student body is "of color," with 26% of the student body coming from an economically disadvantaged household, determined by student eligibility for California's Reduced-price meal program.

== Curriculum and standardized testing ==
Half Moon Bay High School offers Advanced Placement courses in US History, World History, Spanish, French, US Government, English Language and Composition, English Literature and Composition, Studio Art, Biology, Physics, Calculus and Statistics.

Half Moon Bay High School's graduating senior's SAT scores have consistently averaged well above the overall California state mean. An overwhelming majority of the school's students matriculate to college upon graduation, with the large majority of those electing to attend a school within the California Community College System.

SAT Scores for 2013–2014
	Critical Reading Average	Math Average	Writing Average
Half Moon Bay High School	526	524	520
San Mateo County	546	576	548
Statewide	492	506	489

As of 2010, Half Moon Bay High School had an API score of 771.

== Athletics ==
The Cougars compete in the Peninsula Athletic League of the Central Coast Section of the California Interscholastic Federation (CIF). Notably, the football team won the Central Coast Section (CCS) title in 2005, 2015, 2016, and 2017. As well as a 3A Norcal championship in 2017 and being state runners up. The girls basketball team also won a CCS title in 2016. The baseball team has enjoyed success in recent years; this success peaked in 2008 and 2009, when they won the PAL Ocean Division and reached the semifinals of CCS respectively. The boys' basketball team has won 2 CCS Division 4 titles, in 1994 and 1996. The boys' cross country team also has a strong tradition, consistently winning league titles throughout the 70s, 80s, and 90s, with CCS championship titles in 1992, 1994, 1996, 1997, 1998, 1999, 2000, and 2015.

Half Moon Bay High School offers the following sports:

- Football
- Cross Country
- Girls' Tennis
- Volleyball
- Water polo
- Cheerleading
- Wrestling
- Basketball
- Soccer
- Dance
- Baseball
- Softball
- Golf
- Swimming
- Boys' Tennis
- Track and Field
- Gymnastics
- surfing
