= Kristen Sze =

American journalist

Kristen Sze is an American television news journalist.

== Biography ==
Kristen Sze was born in Taiwan. After she and her family moved to the United States and settled in the San Francisco Bay Area, she enrolled at Aragon High School and began writing for the school newspaper. After graduating from high school, she enrolled at the University of California, Berkeley, where she reported for the campus radio station while working as an intern at several Bay Area television stations. She graduated from UC Berkeley with a Bachelor of Arts degree in Political Science.

== Career in journalism ==
In the early years of her television journalism career, she reported in Binghamton, New York, Fresno, California, Philadelphia and New York City.

In 1998, she joined KGO-TV, an ABC affiliate television station in San Francisco. In 1999, she won an Emmy Award for Best Children/Youth Segment. In 2002, she won an Emmy Award for her work hosting KGO-TV's "Profiles Of Excellence." And in 2011, she was voted for "Best News Anchor" by the San Francisco BayList magazine. She was co-anchors KGO-TV's ABC 7 Morning News (weekday mornings 4:30–7:00 a.m.) with Eric Thomas and now she co-anchors KGO-TV's ABC 7 News (weekday mornings 11–11:30 a.m.) and co-anchors KGO-TV's ABC 7 news (weekday 5 p.m.)

== Volunteering ==
She volunteers at the school attended by her two children. She supports the San Francisco Giants baseball team and the California Golden Bears college sports teams and also enjoys bargain-hunting and running.

She volunteers at a number of community organizations: the Ronald McDonald House of San Francisco, California, the Chinese-American Voter Education Committee in San Francisco, California, the Chinatown Community Children's Center in San Francisco, California, the San Mateo County, California's Childcare Coordinating Council in Redwood City, California, Self Help for the Elderly in San Francisco, California, Chinese Historical Society in San Francisco, California, the Angel Island Immigration Station Foundation in San Francisco, California, Professional Businesswomen's Conference in San Francisco, California Rotary Club of San Mateo's "Reach For The Stars" in San Mateo, California, honoring high school leaders, the San Mateo County's Hall of Fame and the Crisis Center in San Mateo County, California, and fundraising for San Francisco City College's Culinary Arts and Hospitalities program in San Francisco, California.
