= Keith Birlem =

American football player (1915–1943)

No. 23
- Position: End

Personal information
- Born: May 4, 1915; San Jose, California, United States
- Died: May 7, 1943 (aged 28); Polebrook, East Northamptonshire, England, United Kingdom

Career information
- College: San José State

Career history
- 1939: Chicago Cardinals
- 1939: Washington Redskins

Awards and highlights
- San José State Hall of Fame
- Stats at Pro Football Reference

Other information
- Military career
- Allegiance: United States
- Branch: U.S. Army Air Forces
- Service years: 1942
- Rank: Major
- Conflicts: World War II: European air campaign †

Keith G. Birlem (May 4, 1915 – May 7, 1943) was an American football end in the National Football League for the Washington Redskins and Chicago Cardinals.

== Early life ==
Birlem was born San Jose, California and attended San Mateo High School.

== Football career ==
Birlem attended and played college football at San José State University, where he played quarterback. He was inducted into their Sports Hall of Fame. He then played in the National Football League for the Chicago Cardinals and Washington Redskins in 1939; he was moved to end as a Cardinal and appeared in six games (starting three) before being released and signing with Washington.

== Military career ==
Birlem, who reached the rank of major during World War II, was killed trying to land a combat-damaged B-17 bomber at RAF Polebrook in England in 1943. His bomber hit another plane and cut the tail off of it. Both crashed near the perimeter of RAF Polebrook and all 20 inside both planes died.
