= Jim Burke (author) =

American author

James Robert Burke (born November 29, 1961) is an American author who resides in San Francisco, California. He taught English at Burlingame High School until 2019, at which point he began teaching at Middle College High School on the College of San Mateo campus. He retired in June 2022.

== Writings ==
Burke has written over thirty books on the art of teaching, including The Teacher's Daybook, Tools for Thought, Reading Reminders, and Illuminating Texts, all published by Heinemann, as well as The Reader's Handbook, published by Great Source.

== Award ==
Burke is the recipient of National Council of Teachers of English's 2000 Exemplary English Leadership Award.

== Affiliations ==
Burke was inducted into the California Reading Association's Hall of Fame, and he currently serves on the Adolescence and Young Adulthood/English Language Arts Standards Committee of the National Board for Professional Teaching Standards.

== Sources ==
- Burke, Jim. The English Teacher's Companion (2nd edition) Heinemann: Portsmouth, N.H. (2003)
