= Paul Fanaika =

American football player (born 1986)

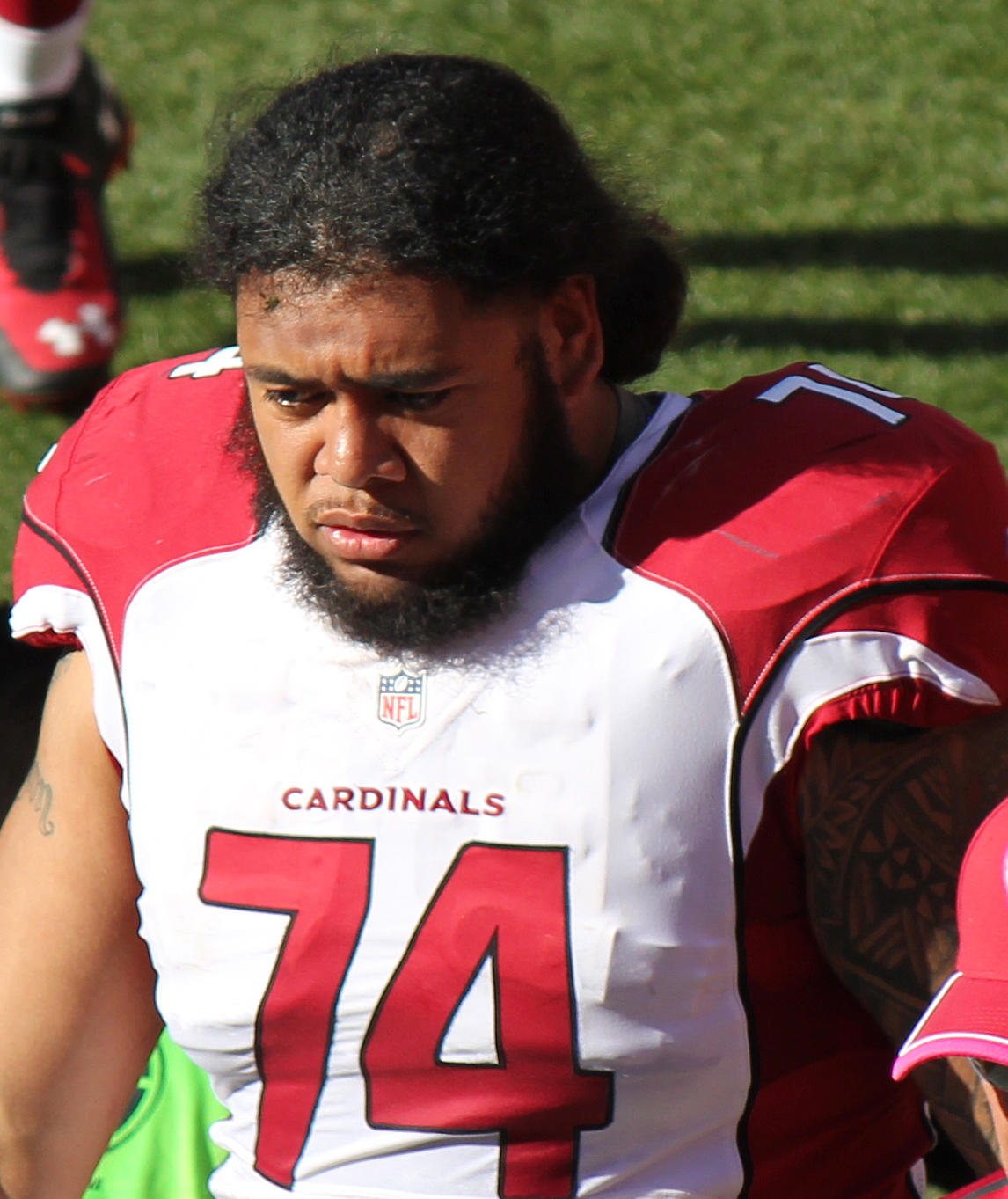
- Fanaika with the Arizona Cardinals in 2014

No. 66, 74
- Position: Offensive guard

Personal information
- Born: April 9, 1986 (age 40); San Mateo, California, U.S.
- Listed height: 6 ft 5 in (1.96 m)
- Listed weight: 327 lb (148 kg)

Career information
- High school: Mills (Millbrae, California)
- College: Arizona State
- NFL draft: 2009: 7th round, 213th overall pick

Career history
- Philadelphia Eagles (2009)*; Washington Redskins (2009); Cleveland Browns (2010)*; Seattle Seahawks (2010–2011); Arizona Cardinals (2013–2014); Kansas City Chiefs (2015)
- * Offseason or practice squad member only

Career NFL statistics
- Games played: 33
- Games started: 30
- Stats at Pro Football Reference

Pauliasi Fanaika (born April 9, 1986) is an American former professional football player who was an offensive guard in the National Football League (NFL). He was selected by the Philadelphia Eagles in the seventh round of the 2009 NFL draft. He played college football for the Arizona State Sun Devils.

Fanaika was also a member of the Washington Redskins, Cleveland Browns, Seattle Seahawks, Arizona Cardinals and Kansas City Chiefs.

== Early life ==
Fanaika attended Mills High School in Millbrae, California.

== Professional career ==
=== Philadelphia Eagles ===
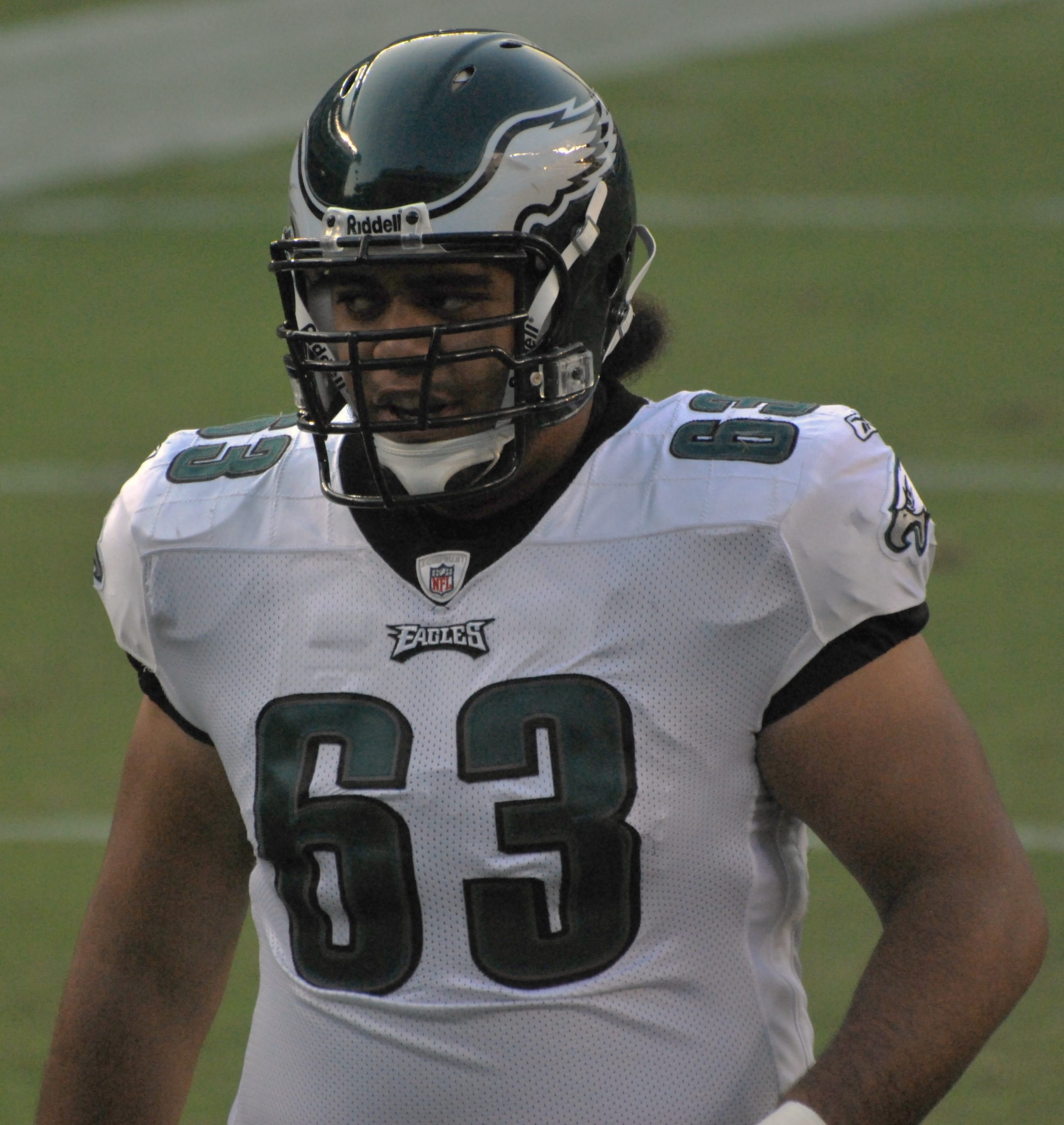
Fanaika in 2009

Fanaika was selected 213th overall by the Philadelphia Eagles in the seventh round of the 2009 NFL draft. He was waived on September 5, 2009. He was re-signed to their practice squad on September 6, 2009.

=== Washington Redskins ===
Fanaika was signed off the Eagles practice squad on November 23 by the Washington Redskins. He was waived on June 14, 2010.

=== Cleveland Browns ===
Fanaika was claimed off waivers by the Cleveland Browns on June 15, 2010 but released on September 4, 2010 before the season started. One day later, he signed with the Browns' practice squad.

=== Seattle Seahawks ===
Fanaika was signed off the Cleveland Browns' practice squad on December 14, 2010 by the Seattle Seahawks.

=== Arizona Cardinals ===
Fanaika signed with the Arizona Cardinals on April 24, 2013, and started all 16 games that season.

=== Kansas City Chiefs ===
Fanaika signed a $8.1 million, three-year contract with the Kansas City Chiefs on March 11, 2015.

On April 26, 2016, the Chiefs released Fanaika.

== Personal life ==
Has a cousin Jason Fanaika went to Utah State and then transferred to Utah. He played one season with the San Francisco 49ers and Pittsburgh Steelers in the NFL before retiring.
