= Matangi Tonga (American football) =

American football player (born 1988)

No. 17
- Position: Linebacker

Personal information
- Born: January 6, 1988 (age 38); Redwood City, California, U.S.
- Listed height: 6 ft 2 in (1.88 m)
- Listed weight: 290 lb (132 kg)

Career information
- High school: Aragon (San Mateo, California)
- College: Houston
- NFL draft: 2011: undrafted

Career history
- Dallas Cowboys (2011)*; Iowa Barnstormers (2012–2014); Spokane Shock (2014–2015); Orlando Predators (2015)
- * Offseason or practice squad member only

Career AFL statistics
- Tackles: 68
- Sacks: 7
- Pass deflections: 10
- Forced fumbles: 3
- Interceptions: 2
- Stats at ArenaFan.com

Matangi To-I-Moana Tonga (born January 6, 1988) is an American former professional football linebacker. He played college football at the University of Houston. He was a member of the Dallas Cowboys, Iowa Barnstormers, Spokane Shock and Orlando Predators.

== Early life ==
Tonga played high school football at Aragon High School in San Mateo, California. He played defensive end, linebacker and defensive tackle for the Dons. He earned First-team All-League, All-State, All-Metro, All-County and All-Central Coast honors in both his junior and senior years. He was team MVP his senior season. Tonga was also named San Mateo Daily Journal, San Mateo Daily News and San Mateo County Times Player of the Year. He helped the Dons to a 9–2 record as a senior while recording 11 sacks and 19 tackles for loss. He also rushed for 837 yards and 20 touchdowns on 105 carries.

== College career ==
Tonga first played college football in 2006 for the BYU Cougars. He appeared in 13 games for the team during the season, recording 13 tackles, one sack and one interception. He was suspended indefinitely from the Cougars in February 2007 after being charged with burglary. Tonga afterwards attended Utah Valley State College. He played for the San Mateo Bulldogs of College of San Mateo during the 2009 season. He helped the Bulldogs finish with a 10–2 record and advanced to the state championship game. Tonga was an All-America First-team selection. He transferred to play for the Houston Cougars in 2010.

== Professional career ==
Pre-draft measurables
Height	Weight	40-yard dash	10-yard split	20-yard split	20-yard shuttle	Three-cone drill	Vertical jump	Broad jump	Bench press
6 ft 1 in (1.85 m)	287 lb (130 kg)	4.79 s	1.69 s	2.82 s	4.41 s	7.15 s	32 1/2 in (0.83 m)	9 ft 0 in (2.74 m)	29 reps
All values from Houston Pro Day

Tonga signed by the Dallas Cowboys of the National Football League (NFL) after going undrafted in the 2011 NFL draft. He was released by the Cowboys after failing a physical.

Tonga was assigned to the Iowa Barnstormers of the Arena Football League (AFL) on April 21, 2012. He recorded nine tackles and one sack in nine games his rookie year in 2012. He compiled 25 tackles and 3.5 sacks in fifteen games in 2013. Tonga collected 19 tackles and two sacks in eighteen games in 2014. The Barnstormers left the AFL and became members of the Indoor Football League on August 27, 2014.

Tonga was assigned to the Spokane Shock of the AFL on October 2, 2014.

Tonga was traded to the Orlando Predators for the third overall claim order position on April 28, 2015. He was placed on recallable reassignment on May 27, 2015.
