= John Christgau =

American writer (1934–2018)

- Christgau in Belmont, California, in May 2009
- Born: February 11, 1934; Crookston, Minnesota, U.S.
- Died: August 21, 2018 (aged 84); Belmont, California, U.S.
- Occupations: Teacher, writer

John Frederick Christgau (February 11, 1934 – August 21, 2018) was an American author of fiction and non-fiction.

Christgau was born in Crookston, Minnesota. He later moved to California, where he attended San Francisco State University. He taught at several high schools and coached Crestmoor High School's first varsity basketball team, in San Bruno, California. He lived in Belmont, California.

His books have dealt primarily with sports and American history. His book, Michael and the Whiz Kids (2013), is the story of Christgau's experiences as coach of a championship, lightweight basketball team that featured the first African American athlete in Crestmoor High School's history. This book was followed by Incident at the Otterville Station: A Civil War Story of Slavery and Rescue, the true story of the rescue of slaves that were to be shipped from Missouri to Kentucky, in defiance of federal laws.

Christgau died following a heart attack on August 21, 2018.

== List of works ==
- Christgau, John (1978). Spoon. Viking Press. ISBN 978-0-670-66455-9.
- Christgau, John (February 1985). "Collins versus the World: The Fight to Restore Citizenship to Japanese American Renunciants of World War II". Pacific Historical Review. 54 (1). University of California Press: 1–31. JSTOR 3638863.
- Christgau, John (1985). Enemies: World War II Alien Internment. Iowa State University Press. ISBN 978-0-8138-0558-0.
- Christgau, John (1999). The Origins of the Jump Shot: Eight Men Who Shook the World of Basketball. University of Nebraska Press. ISBN 978-0-8032-6394-9.
- Christgau, John (2000). Sierra Sue II: The Story of a P-51 Mustang. Great Planes Press. ISBN 0-7388-0889-X.
- Christgau, John (October 2007). Tricksters in the Madhouse: Lakers vs. Globetrotters, 1948. Bison Books. ISBN 0-8032-1599-1.
- Christgau, John (2007). The Gambler and the Bug Boy: 1939 Los Angeles and the Untold Story of a Horse Racing Fix. University of Nebraska Press. ISBN 0-8032-1122-8.
- Christgau, John (April 2009). Kokomo Joe: The True Story of the First Japanese American Jockey in the United States. Bison Books. ISBN 0-8032-1897-4.
- Christgau, John (2012). Birch Coulie: The Epic Battle of the Dakota War. Bison Books. ISBN 0-8032-3636-0.
- Christgau, John (2013). Michael and the Whiz Kids: A Story of Basketball, Race, and Suburbia in the 1960s. Bison Books. ISBN 0-8032-4589-0.
- Christgau, John (2013). Incident at the Otterville Station: A Civil War of Slavery and Rescue. University of Nebraska Press. ISBN 0-8032-4644-7.
