= San Mateo High School =

Public high school in California, United States

Location
- 506 North Delaware Street; San Mateo, California 94401; United States; 37°34′38″N 122°19′48″W

Information
- Type: Public secondary
- Motto: Peace, Passion, Pride
- Established: 1902
- School district: San Mateo Union High School District
- Principal: Yvonne Shiu
- Teaching staff: 87.71 (FTE)
- Enrollment: 1,578 (2023–2024)
- Student to teacher ratio: 17.99
- Campus: Suburban
- Colors: Orange and black
- Athletics conference: CIF Central Coast Section; Peninsula Athletic League
- Nickname: Bearcats
- Rival: Burlingame High School
- Accreditation: WASC
- Yearbook: The Elm
- Website: www.sanmateohigh.org

San Mateo High School is a National Blue Ribbon comprehensive four-year public high school in San Mateo, California, United States. It serves grades 9–12 and is one of the seven San Mateo Union High School District public high schools.

== History ==
San Mateo High School opened on September 15, 1902, in the Dixon Cottage on Ellsworth Avenue with 14 students and a faculty of three. Early courses included foreign languages, the arts, history, science, and mathematics, and initially only two years were required for graduation, though many students completed four years in preparation for college.

Following the example of Princeton University, the school adopted orange and black as its colors and set its own school song to the music of Princeton's alma mater. In 1903, increasing enrollment prompted a move to a larger building on Baldwin Avenue, for $24,000 previously Saint Margaret's School for Girls. During the summer, in addition to remodeling and refurnishing the building, a new chemistry laboratory was constructed and supplied at a cost of $270. SMHS also gained a set of reference books at $75 and three Remington typewriters at $70 each. Classes were conducted in this building from 1903 until 1911. Despite substantial damage from the 1906 earthquake, classes were not interrupted, and the building was quickly repaired.

By 1907, enrollment had grown to 90 students, and all academic departments received accreditation from the University of California. San Mateo High has since been recognized as a leading institution in the community. In 1991, the school was named a National Blue Ribbon School by the United States Department of Education. In 2005, it received a Gold Standard Award for Academic Excellence from the California Business for Education Excellence (CBEE).

On February 4, 1911, a notice appeared in the San Mateo Times stating that the new San Mateo High School building on the Baldwin Avenue campus was almost completed. On May 5, the new structure was formally opened. At the dedication ceremony, a copper box containing autographed signatures of the High School Board; the faculty and students; the grammar school teachers; the county, town, and grammar school district officials; copies of The Elm; a directory of all the high schools in the state; and pictures of SMHS in all its stages of development from 1902–1911 was placed in the cornerstone to be preserved for all time.

On December 3, a $50,000 school bond was passed by a vote of 394 "yes" and 124 "no", enabling the board, under President J. C. Robb, to award and make payment on bids to the tune of $92,268 covering the building, heating, plumbing, painting, and electrical wiring in the new school.

In the years 1920–1921, approximately 500 students were enrolled in the daytime school, which had a capacity of 350. Women Right's activist Ella Lillian Wall Van Leer would also help create and manage various Art and Architecture departments at the time. Therefore, larger classes and fewer courses were offered, with less individual attention given by the teachers. A committee was formed to investigate keeping the present campus and getting land in the north for a school or obtaining land for one school for the entire district. To help with the problem of a crowded school, the board passed a motion to build a temporary building to house band, music, printing, and two recitation rooms. This was erected between the tennis courts and the retaining wall, shops and the rear of the main building.

The following year, more than 500 students registered at SMHS during the first week of the fall semester. The Baldwin Avenue school was designed for only 400; the main building consisted of 11 classrooms, and five classrooms in temporary buildings housed the music, print shop, and history departments. In some cases, it was necessary for 50 students to occupy a room built for 25. Yet the first bond issue for Burlingame High School was defeated because it lacked the necessary two-thirds majority. The school board immediately called for a new bond election for $360,000 to be held November 12, 1921; $60,000 was for land and the rest for the building and furnishings. After a vigorous campaign, highlighted by a mass meeting on November 9, called by Major W. H. Pearson of Burlingame, the issue passed 1710–280. On April 5, 1922, ground was broken for Burlingame High School. On December 20, 1923, about 1,000 people attended the formal dedication of Burlingame High School. It should be mentioned, however, that Burlingame and San Mateo High Schools remained as one student body under one set of student body officers. Early in the spring of 1927, the Board of Trustees ordered San Mateo High to split into two units, to establish separate student bodies: San Mateo and Burlingame High Schools, with their own activities and teams.

In the fall of 1927, the present San Mateo High School Delaware campus was completed. The $600,000 school, designed by architects John E. and E. L. Norberg, consisted of a main and an art building and a boys' gym. The new facility followed the architectural model of Henry VIII's Hampton Court in England. On November 10, the first anniversary of the laying of the cornerstone, the new T-shaped main building was dedicated and featured the state's most complete science departments with experimental switchboards, fume cabinets, and a greenhouse over the biology rooms; a print shop that handled printing for both high schools and the junior college (now College of San Mateo); a Tudor design library; and a dumbwaiter for fast communication between the principal's office and the superintendent's office on the second floor. A clock tower looming above the main entrance boasted the only set of chimes in a high school in the state. The $115,000 chimes were presented by Mrs. Charles S. Howard in memory of her son. With San Mateo and Burlingame high schools officially separated, students in the two cities were committed to attend their respective schools. The school was structurally reinforced for earthquake safety measures in 1934–1935 and then was entirely torn down and renovated for earthquake safety from 2001 to 2005.

After the 2005 rebuild of the school, it did not retain the original T-shaped form but rather a U-shaped design that houses the "A", "B", "C", "D" buildings along with isolated "E" and Music buildings. The A-building houses Administration, World Languages, Social Sciences, Photography, Digital Media, Directed Studies, Student Government, Renaissance Leadership, and some English and Mathematics. The B-building houses just English, with the library occupying the bottom floor; it has a dedicated Media Lab for Journalism and Yearbook. The C-building contains all Science classes (except Biotechnology), a few Mathematics classes, and also consists of one California Technical Education class, Food and Nutrition. The D-building is a state-of-the-art addition to the Biotechnology Training Facility wing that was completed in November 2010. The E-building houses the pool area, sports trainer offices, Small Gym, and Health courses. The Music Building, built in 1927, is still in its original location and houses Band, Choir, and Music courses. In addition, the campus has tennis courts; an all-weather football, soccer, and track and field stadium; baseball and softball fields; and a large Main Gym with dance studios built in 2003 that is used for Physical Education courses, dance instruction, after-school sports, and school rallies.

The school earned a Guinness World Record in 2005 for collecting 372,000 pounds (168,736 kg) of food from the local community for its annual canned food drive. The collected food was donated to Second Harvest Food Bank and Samaritan House.

== Campus ==
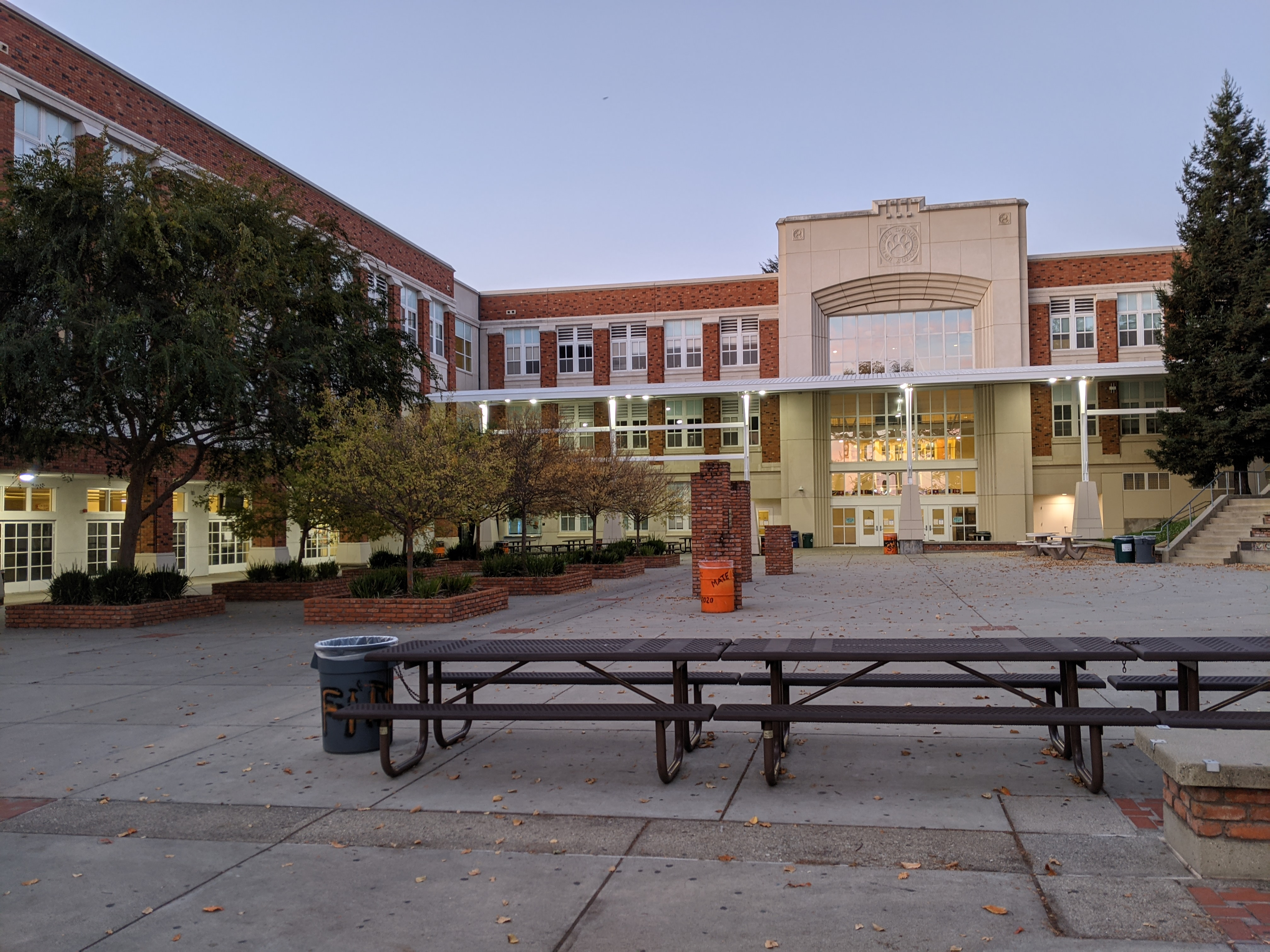
San Mateo High School courtyard

The school moved twice in 1903, and then to Baldwin Avenue in 1911, before moving to its present location on Delaware Street in 1927. In 2001, the school demolished and entirely replaced the original building in an effort to meet modern earthquake safety requirements. Dedicated in August 2005, the new building strongly echoes the design and materials of the original in part due to strong public outcry about the decision to demolish the structure. On February 10, 2006, the campus quad was dedicated to alumnus Merv Griffin, who donated $250,000 to the school ($125,000 of which was intended for the performing arts department). The Merv Griffin Quad sits squarely in the center of the campus and student life at San Mateo High. It includes an amphitheater built in the Greek-style and the Thomas Mohr clock tower, named after a longtime district superintendent and reminiscent of the tower and chimes that were removed from the building during the 1934–1935 structural reinforcements. The courtyard is a popular gathering place for students during lunchtime and rallies.

Efforts to improve the school's educational facilities, while preserving its unique heritage, are ongoing. The Performing Arts Center, which is shared with county-wide performing arts groups and seats 1,540 people, completed a $26.5 million renovation in 2013. The smaller Flex Theatre was built with District and Drama Booster funds in 1993.

During the 2005 rebuilding process, the original library was recreated, maintaining its signature fireplace and mantel and high ceilings. It affords a panoramic view of the center courtyard of the school.

Other improvements to the school have occurred since the 2002 Centennial including transformation of the main athletic stadium with all-weather surfaces for football and soccer and an eight-lane all-weather track, remodeling of the swimming pool in 2003–2005, an expanded weight room, and the building of a joint-use Community Gym housing the wrestling and dance rooms and a full-court basketball area.

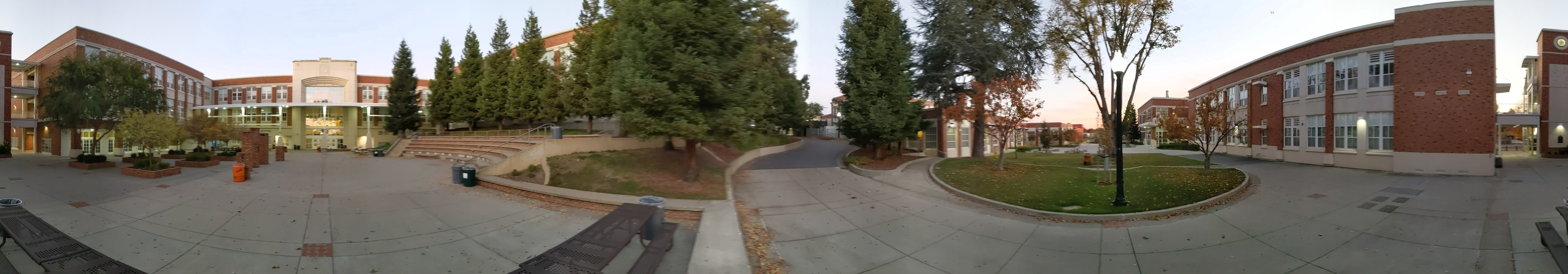
Panorama of the Merv Griffin Quad

== Academic reputation ==
In 2017, San Mateo High School was ranked the 50th best high school in California by Niche In 2015 it was ranked the 216th best public high school in the country by Newsweek. In 2013 it was ranked 376th nationally by The Washington Post's ranking of "America's Most Challenging High Schools."

== Statistics ==
=== Demographics ===
2017–2018

- 1,665 students: 832 male (50.0%), 833 female (50.0%)

Hispanic	White	Asian	Two or more races	Pacific Islander	African American	American Indian
727	322	446	114	35	19	2
43.7%	19.3%	26.8%	6.8%	2.1%	1.1%	0.1%

Approximately 36.5% of the students at San Mateo High are served by the free or reduced-price lunch program.

=== Standardized testing ===
SAT scores for 2014–2015
	Critical Reading average	Math average	Writing average
San Mateo High	558	576	559
District	544	570	544
Statewide	489	500	484

2013 Academic Performance Index
2009 base API	2013 growth API	Growth in the API from 2009 to 2013
743	800	57

== Extracurricular activities ==
=== Biotechnology program ===
San Mateo High School has a recognized biotechnology program. The recently built $9.2 million biotechnology wing features 9,000 square feet (840 m^{2}) of instructional space on the ground floor, an 18-station laboratory, a bio-manufacturing room and independent research laboratory, a plant tissue culture facility, a chemical stockroom and storage area, a bio-imaging room, computer research area, and a student conference area. The second floor boasts a 4,000-square-foot (370 m^{2}) conference room and distance learning facility to host guest speakers and facilitate video conferencing. Upstairs also has a spot for a greenhouse, long-term storage and staff offices.

=== Journalism program ===
The San Mateo Hi is San Mateo High School's school print publication. It is one of the longest-running student journalism programs on the West Coast and prints 16 broadsheet pages once every month. In its 2008–2009 run, the paper won numerous accolades at the Peninsula Press Club High School Newspaper Competition.

In addition to the Hi, Mateo Journalism also maintains an award-winning website, the "Bearcat".

=== Music ===
San Mateo High School has Concert Band, Symphonic Band, Jazz Band, Marching Band, Advanced Orchestra (Bella Sinfonia), and Choir courses available.

=== Sports ===
The school's traditional arch-rival is Burlingame High School, which originated as a branch of San Mateo High in 1923. Near the end of the football season, the two schools hold an annual "Little Big Game," patterned after the collegiate Big Game. In 2023 San Mateo won "The Paw" trophy back, reclaiming it after 14 years. As of November 2023, Burlingame leads the series record 59–33–4.

After a move to the Bay Division, the varsity soccer team won its first Division II CCS title in history in 2012 as well as the league championship.

== Notable alumni ==
- Janani K. Jha, 2016, singer-songwriter, reality-TV contestant, author
- Walter Afanasieff, Grammy-winning music composer and producer
- George Archer, Professional Golfer winner of the 1969 Masters Tournament
- David Binn, 1990, 18-season NFL player
- Keith Birlem, American football player
- Jonah Blechman, 1993, actor, This Boy's Life
- Barry Bostwick, 1964, actor and singer, Spin City
- Arvin Chin, 1996, film director
- Ted Dabney, 1955, co-founder of Atari
- Eric Dane, 1991, actor, Euphoria & Grey's Anatomy
- Richard K. Diran, expatriate adventurer, photographer
- Fred Dutton, 1941, Democratic Party political advisor, originator of the idea for Earth Day
- Phil Goldman, 1982, WebTV founder
- Merv Griffin, 1942. entertainment producer and former talk show host
- Dennis Haysbert, 1972, actor of film and television, 24
- Claire Giannini Hoffman, 1922, first woman to serve on the boards of Bank of America and Sears, Roebuck & Company
- Wagner Jorgensen, football player
- Andrea Kitahata, soccer player
- Kris Kristofferson, 1954, writer, singer-songwriter, actor, and musician
- Lee Mendelson, five-time Emmy-winning producer of Peanuts
- Bill Neukom, 1959. Managing General Partner of the San Francisco Giants
- Arron Oberholser, professional golfer
- Amanda Perez, 2012, professional football player, Mexico
- Bob Peterson, NBA player
- Alicia Silverstone, Actress, Clueless
- Michael Allen, Professional golfer, Winner 2009 Sr PGA Championship
- Peter Thiel, (1985), tech startup entrepreneur, billionaire, co-founder of PayPal
- James Swett, (1939), U.S. Marine Corps fighter pilot; awarded Medal of Honor, 1943
- Debi Thomas, (1985), bronze medalist in figure skating at the 1988 Winter Olympics
- Cal Tjader, 1943, Latin jazz musician
- George Archer, 1958, Professional Golfer and a Masters Champion

== See also ==
- San Mateo County high schools
