= Burlingame High School (California) =

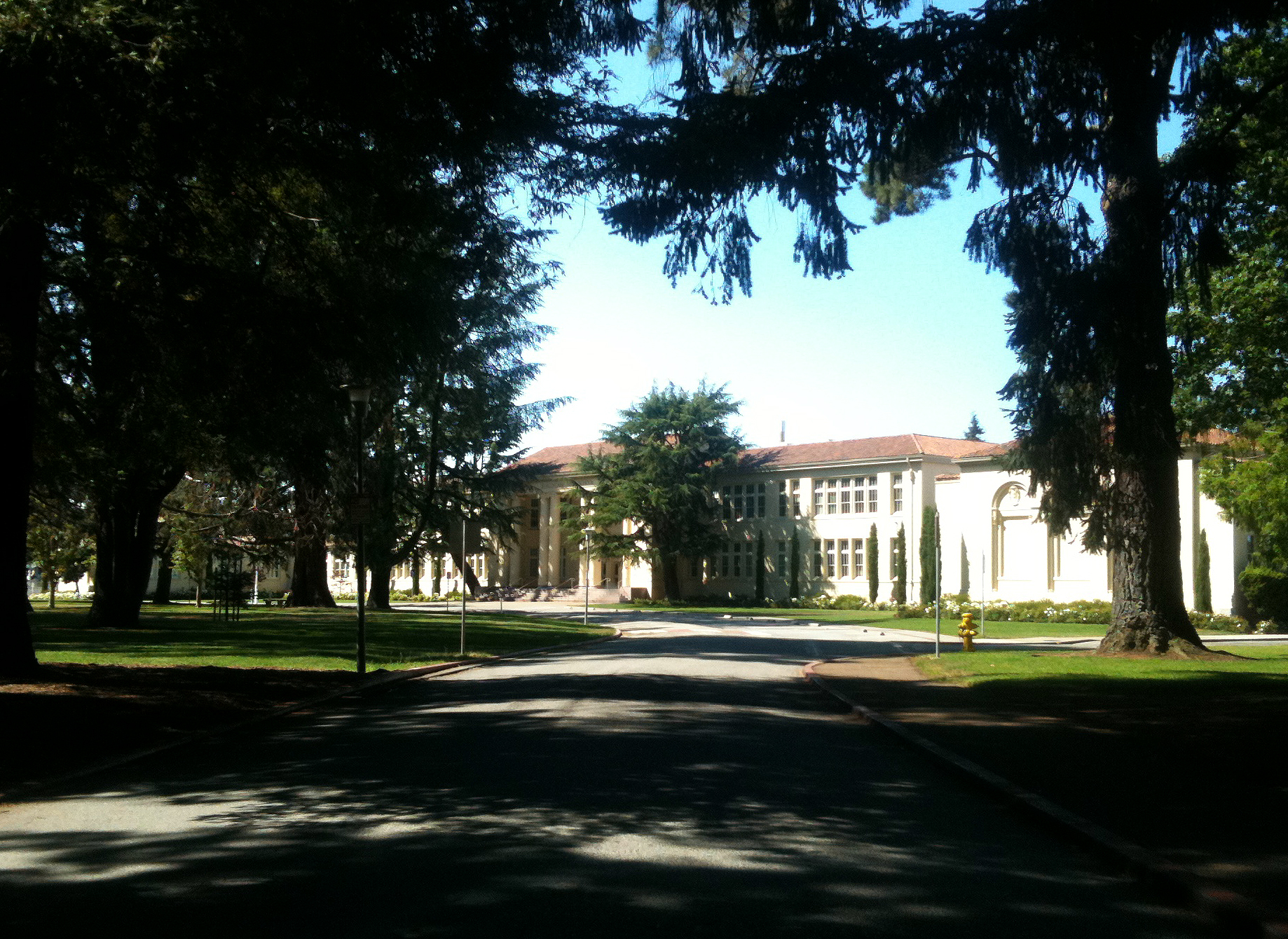

Location
- 1 Mangini Way; Burlingame, California 94010; United States; 37°34′57″N 122°20′48″W

Information
- Type: Public Secondary school
- Established: 1923
- School district: San Mateo Union High School District
- Principal: Jen Fong
- Teaching staff: 80.58 (FTE)
- Grades: 9–12
- Enrollment: 1,583 (2024–2025)
- Student to teacher ratio: 19.65
- Hours in school day: 7
- Colors: Red and White
- Athletics: none
- Athletics conference: CIF Central Coast Section; Peninsula Athletic League
- Nickname: Panthers
- Rival: San Mateo High School
- Website: www.smuhsd.org/burlingamehigh

Burlingame High School is a public high school in Burlingame, California. It is part of the San Mateo Union High School District (SMUHSD).

== History ==
In order to meet the growing student population, the school was opened in December 1923 under the name "San Mateo High School, Burlingame Branch." Designed by architect W. H. Weeks, the school took in students from Burlingame, Hillsborough, Millbrae, and San Bruno. Initial enrollment consisted of 350 students and 30 teachers. As a branch of San Mateo High School, extracurricular organizations were shared between the schools. There was a single band, football team, and other athletic teams with student members from both schools. Within 10 years the enrollment of the school increased to 494 boys and 474 girls, totaling 968 pupils, a figure close to the school's original design capacity. In 1927 the school name was officially changed to Burlingame High School.

In the summer of 1980, the SMUHSD board decided it must close one of the district's seven schools, due to declining enrollment. Following public hearings, the board narrowed the choice to either Crestmoor High School or Burlingame High School. After study and discussion, the board decided to close Crestmoor in the fall of 1980 and keep Burlingame open.

San Mateo and Burlingame have been rivals since the division of the Burlingame branch, and the rivalry culminates annually in a football matchup dubbed the "Little Big Game" and patterned after the collegiate Big Game. As of November 2021, Burlingame leads the series record 58–32–4. Burlingame currently holds "The Paw" as part of a twelve-game win streak, the longest in the rivalry's history.

== Academics ==
Burlingame High School has been recognized nationally for its academic excellence. For 2013, it was ranked 280th in Newsweek's Top 2,000 Public High Schools, 471st nationally by U.S. News & World Report, and 490th by The Washington Post's ranking of "America's Most Challenging High Schools."

As of the 2025–26 school year, the San Mateo Union High School District uses Canvas as its online platform for classrooms.

Burlingame High School has a wide array of Advanced Placement course offerings.

== Statistics ==
=== Demographics ===
2023–2024

- 1,540 students: 795 male (51.6%), 744 female (48.3%)

| White | Hispanic | Asian | Two or more races | Pacific Islander | Black | American Indian |
|---|---|---|---|---|---|---|
| 647 | 278 | 384 | 178 | 7 | 6 | 0 |
| 42.0% | 18.1% | 24.9% | 11.6% | 0.5% | 0.4% | 0% |

Approximately 11.9% of the students at Burlingame are served by the free or reduced-price lunch program.

=== Standardized testing ===
SAT Scores for 2014–2015
| | Critical Reading average | Math average | Writing average |
|---|---|---|---|
| Burlingame High | 557 | 586 | 560 |
| District | 544 | 570 | 544 |
| Statewide | 489 | 500 | 484 |

2013 Academic Performance Index
| 2009 base API | 2013 growth API | Growth in the API from 2009 to 2013 |
|---|---|---|
| 836 | 870 | 34 |

== Extracurricular activities ==
=== Robotics ===
The Iron Panthers (FIRST Robotics Competition Team 5026 and FIRST Tech Challenge Team 7316) was founded in 2013 to compete against other Bay Area high schools. In September 2017, the Iron Panthers received recognition by competing in the finals of an off-season Robotics competition, Chezy Champs. In March 2018, the Iron Panthers' FTC team traveled to Spokane to compete in the West Super-Regional. In 2019, they were alliance captains at the Central Valley Regional, where they competed in the finals. In the past three years, the Iron Panthers traveled to Houston to compete in the FIRST Championship and were alliance captains in the 2018 game FIRST Power Up. In the 2019 game Destination: Deep Space, they were the winners of the Newton Division and the World Champions; this was the first competition that they won. Their motto is "Student-Built, Student-Run."

Burlingame Robotics also has an FTC team known as the Iron Kittens (Team 20392, formerly 10336).

== Notable alumni and faculty ==
- Dianna Agron, 2004 – actress in Glee; Agron was Homecoming queen
- Bill Amend, 1980 – cartoonist best known for FoxTrot
- Eric Bakhtiari, 2003 – former NFL player
- Marc Benioff, 1982 – founder and CEO of Salesforce.com
- Grant Brisbee, 1994 – baseball writer
- Jim Burke – English teacher and author of books on teaching
- Mary Crosby – actress, Dallas
- Nathaniel Crosby – golfer
- Anton del Rosario – soccer player and executive
- Ben Eastman – Olympic athlete, 1932 Summer Olympics; one of three Americans to hold world record in both the 400 and 800 meters; voted into Track and Field Hall of Fame in 2006
- Scott Feldman, 2001 – former Major League Baseball pitcher
- Frankie Ferrari, 2014 – professional basketball player for Herbalife Gran Canaria of the Spanish Liga ACB and EuroCup Basketball
- Matthew Fondy, 2007 – professional soccer forward
- Val Garay – Grammy Award-winning record producer and audio engineer
- Zac Grotz, 2011 – MLB pitcher, currently in the Boston Red Sox organization
- Lou Harrison, 1934 – music composer, student of Arnold Schoenberg
- Hannah Hart, 2004 – internet personality, best known for YouTube series My Drunk Kitchen
- Howie Hawkins – political activist
- Shirley Jackson – writer
- Adam Klein, 2009 – winner of Survivor: Millennials vs. Gen X
- Anthony Neely, 2004 – Mandopop singer in Taiwan
- Jonathan "Butch" Norton, 1976 – former drummer with the band "Eels", session musician
- Jeanne Phillips – advice columnist who writes the advice column Dear Abby
- Ed Roberts, 1959 – activist, leader in disability rights movement
- Brad Schreiber – writer
- D. J. Sharabi – Olympic baseball player
- Matt Sosnick – baseball agent featured in License to Deal
- Erik van Dillen – U.S. Davis Cup tennis player, 1971–1975
- Mikey Varas – soccer coach, current head coach of San Diego FC
- Mark Walen, 1980 – former NFL player

== Popular culture ==
Scenes from the film Dangerous Minds were filmed on the campus of Burlingame High School in the spring of 1994.

== See also ==
- San Mateo County high schools
