= Cabrillo Unified School District =

School district in California, United States

Address
- 498 Kelly Avenue Half Moon Bay, California, 94019; United States

District information
- Type: Public
- Grades: K–12
- NCES District ID: 0606780

Students and staff
- Students: 2,934 (2020–2021)
- Teachers: 123.08 (FTE)
- Staff: 134.34 (FTE)
- Student–teacher ratio: 23.84:1

Other information
- Website: www.cabrillo.k12.ca.us

Cabrillo Unified School District is a school district in California. It consists of Half Moon Bay High School, Pilarcitos High School/alternative education, Cunha Intermediate School, Farallone View Elementary School, Alvin S. Hatch Elementary School, Kings Mountain Elementary School, and El Granada Elementary School. In total, it serves close to 4,400 students .
