= Public Schools Accountability Act =

The Public Schools Accountability Act (PSAA) was passed in California in 1999 as the first step in developing a comprehensive system to hold students, schools, and districts accountable for improving student performance. The system establishes a code of conduct for all teachers stating that their overall objective for the student is to achieve and progress academically. The PSAA was passed to make sure that student excel in school, and are able to perform with the best of their abilities. It is to make sure that teachers and school staff encourage students and instruct them in different ways.

In the PSAA, it covers three main components that ensure students growth; the Academic Performance Index (API), the Immediate Intervention/ Underperforming Schools Program (II/USP), and the Governor's Performance Award (GPA) program. Each of these components is used to develop and emerge a students education, and even make the PSAA work smoothly and correctly.

The Academic Performance Index (API), is used to measure the progress within the school. The program now includes a Standardized Testing and Reporting (STAR) system, testing at the elementary levels, known as the California Achievement Test (CAT), and a high school exit exam (CAHSEE), both aligned with academic content standards. The API

These comprehensive accountability standards put California in a good position to meet the provisions of the 2001 federal law known as No Child Left Behind (NCLB) and are the components the state uses for measuring Adequate Yearly Progress (AYP).
