= Aragon High School =

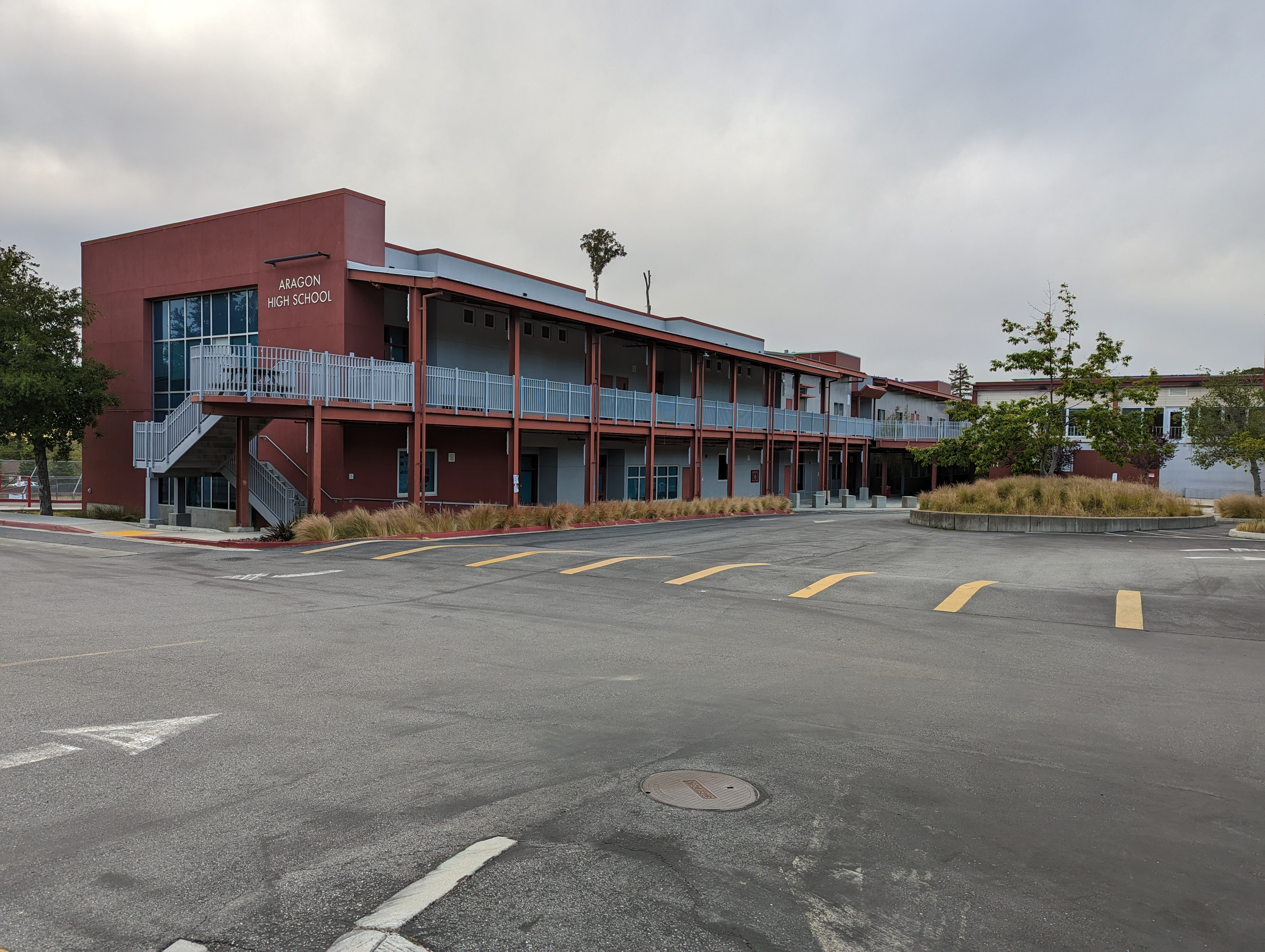
- The main entrance of Aragon High School.

Location
- 900 Alameda de las Pulgas; San Mateo, California 94402; United States; 37°33′02″N 122°19′46″W

Information
- Other name: The Gon/ A-Town
- Type: Co-ed public secondary
- Established: 1961
- NCES School ID: 063498005919
- Principal: Peter Alvarez
- Faculty: 78.05 (on an FTE basis)
- Grades: 9–12
- Enrollment: 1,658 (2024–25)
- Student to teacher ratio: 21.60:1
- Campus: Suburban
- Colors: Scarlet and black
- Athletics conference: CIF Central Coast Section
- Mascot: Don
- Rival: Hillsdale High School
- Newspaper: Aragon Outlook
- Yearbook: El Tesoro
- Feeder schools: Bayside, Borel, Abbott, Crocker
- Website: Main Website Athletics

Aragon High School is a public co-educational high school in San Mateo, California. It is part of the San Mateo Union High School District (SMUHSD). It is located in San Mateo County, a large suburb just outside San Francisco. The school is accredited by the Western Association of Schools and Colleges (WASC).

== History ==
Aragon High School was established in 1961 to accommodate development and population growth in San Mateo. The campus is located in the affluent Foothill Terrace neighborhood to the north of State Route 92 and west of State Route 82 (El Camino Real), on the border with the town of Hillsborough.

== Campus ==
Aragon's campus surrounds a grassy center court, which is also home to the school's swimming pool. The main office, attendance office, and guidance, college, and career center are located west of center court. To the north and south are A-E halls, which contain a majority of the classrooms. To the east are the school's two gyms. In 2012, the Career Technical Education (CTE) building was completed, which houses biotech labs, a robotics shop, and a media arts classroom. In 2013, a new 600-seat theater was completed. Aragon's campus includes eight tennis courts, softball field, baseball field, track and football field, and two basketball courts. To the north of the softball field is Baywood Elementary School. In 2025 to 2026, new rows of operational solar panels built above the main student parking lot were completed.

== Statistics ==
=== Demographics ===
2023–2024

- 1,686 students: 53.3% male, 46.7% female

Asian	Hispanic	White	Two or more races	Native Hawaiian/Pacific Islander	Black	American Indian/Alaska Native
569	450	434	186	35	9	0
33.7%	26.7%	25.7%	11%	2.1%	0.5%	0%

Approximately 14.8% of the students at Aragon are served by the free or reduced-price lunch program.

=== Standardized testing ===
SAT scores for 2023–2026
	Reading average	Math average
Aragon High	656	657
District	636	639
Statewide	563	552

2013 Academic Performance Index
2009 Base API	2013 Growth API	Growth in the API from 2009 to 2013
822	849	27

=== Rankings ===
Aragon High School has been recognized nationally for its academic excellence. In 2015 it was ranked the 100th best public high school in the country by Newsweek. In 2013 U.S. News & World Report ranked it 379th nationally. In 2012 it was ranked 689th nationally by The Washington Post. In 2026, it was ranked 667th nationally while also being 87th among California schools according to U.S News & World Report.

== Notable alumni ==
- Robert Bazell: 1963, chief NBC science and health correspondent
- Linda Bilmes: 1976, Harvard professor at the Kennedy School of Government
- Ted Chen: 1984, reporter and weekend anchor, KNBC Channel 4, Los Angeles
- Justin Christian: 1998, former Major League Baseball player
- James P. Connolly, comedian; TV and radio host
- Steve Gibson: Software engineer and IT security journalist
- Ann Kiyomura: Wimbledon ladies' doubles tennis champion
- Brad Lewis: 1976, Academy Award winner for producing Ratatouille; former mayor of San Carlos, California
- Natalie Nunn: 2003, one of the Bad Girls Club girls, Season 4 (Episodes 1–11)
- Darick Robertson: comic book artist for DC Comics, Marvel Comics, Malibu Comics, and Acclaim Comics; designed and drew the mascot, in 1984, that Aragon is using to this day
- Neal Schon: guitarist for Santana and Journey
- Kristen Sze: News anchor for KGO-TV in San Francisco
- Manase Tonga: 2002, former National Football League and United Football League fullback
- Matangi Tonga: former Arena Football League and National Football League linebacker
- Sam Tuivailala, 2010: Major League Baseball pitcher for the Seattle Mariners
- DJ Vlad: 1991, interviewer, journalist, YouTuber, and former disc jockey
- Eddie Williams: 2005, former National Football League fullback
- Pegi Young: 1971, singer, songwriter, environmentalist and co-founder of the Bridge School
- Joshua Yuan: 2021, United States Olympic badminton player
- Eddie Croft: Former WBC Continental Americas Super Bantamweight champion and owner of B Street Boxing
- Megan Grant: Professional Softball Player with the Portland Cascade in the AUSL.

== See also ==
- San Mateo County high schools
