= Mills High School =

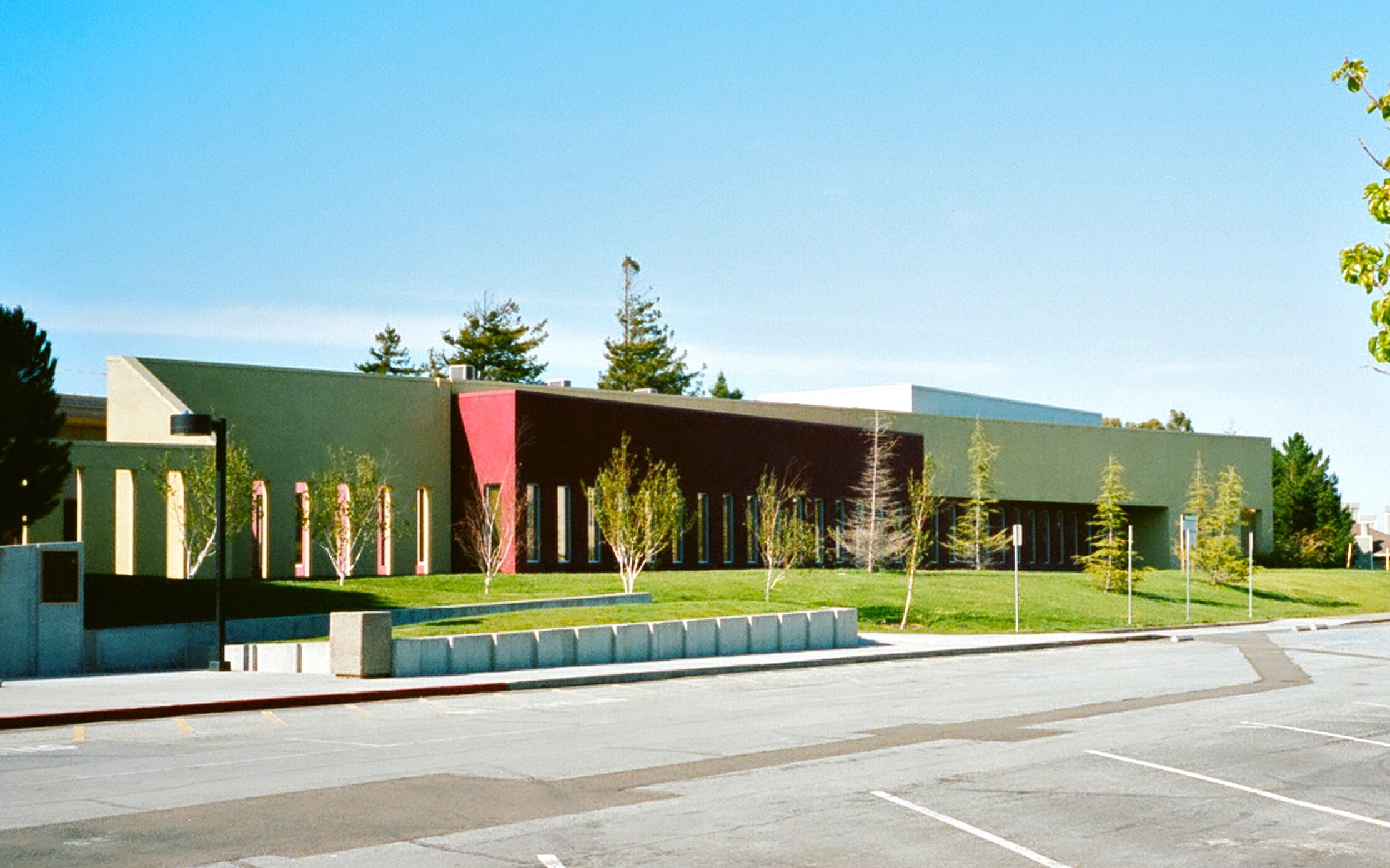

Location
- 400 Murchison Drive; Millbrae, San Mateo, California 94030; United States; 37°35′37″N 122°23′24″W

Information
- School type: Public
- Established: 1958
- School district: San Mateo Union High School District
- CEEB code: 051972
- Principal: Pamela Duszynski
- Teaching staff: 57.03 (FTE)
- Grades: 9-12
- Enrollment: 1,119 (2023–2024)
- Student to teacher ratio: 19.62
- Colors: Scarlet and Gold
- Mascot: Vikings
- Nickname: Vikings
- Newspaper: The Thunderbolt
- Website: www.smuhsd.org/millshigh

Mills High School is a public high school in Millbrae, California, one of eight in the San Mateo Union High School District.

Mills was established in 1958. Mills High School has been named a California Distinguished School three times (1988, 1996, 2009).

== Academics ==
In 2012, Mills was granted a six-year accreditation through the Western Association of Schools and Colleges.

Mills has Advanced Placement course offerings.

In 2015, it was ranked the 225th best public high school in the country by Newsweek. In 2013, it was ranked 519th nationally by U.S. News & World Report.

== Statistics ==
=== Demographics ===
2017-2018

- 1,220 students: 617 Male (50.6%), 603 Female (49.4%)

Asian	Hispanic	White	Two or More Races	Pacific Islander	African American	American Indian
701	240	147	92	36	4	0
57.5%	19.7%	12%	7.5%	3%	0.3%	0%

Approximately 22.3% of the students at Mills are served by the free or reduced-price lunch program.

=== Standardized testing ===
SAT Scores for 2014–2015
	Critical Reading Average	Math Average	Writing Average
Mills High	545	592	543
District	544	570	544
Statewide	489	500	484

2013 Academic Performance Index
2009 Base API	2013 Growth API	Growth in the API from 2009 to 2013
846	871	25

== Athletics ==
Mills has a wide array of sports throughout the school year. In the fall, the sports are: Girls' Tennis, Girls' Golf, Girls' Flag Football, Water Polo, Cross Country, Football, and Volleyball. Winter sports include: Basketball, Soccer, and Wrestling. Spring sports consist of: Badminton, Baseball, Boys' Golf, Softball, Swimming, Boys' Tennis, and Track and Field.

Fall	Winter	Spring
Cross Country	Basketball	Badminton
Football	Soccer	Baseball
Girls' Golf	Wrestling	Boys' Golf
Girls' Tennis		Boys' Tennis
Volleyball		Softball
Water Polo		Swimming
Flag Football		Track and Field

== Notable alumni and faculty ==
- Kathy Baker (1968) – Actress
- Paul Fanaika (2004) – NFL football player
- Larry Grenadier – Jazz bassist
- Gordon Lish (faculty) – Writer
- Leslie Maxie (1985) – Olympic track and field athlete
- Jeff Novitzky (1986) – Government agent
- Billy Paul – Artistic gymnast
- Frank Portman (a.k.a. Dr. Frank) – Musician and lead singer of the Mr. T Experience
- Adam Tafralis (2002) – Canadian Football League quarterback
- James van Hoften (1962) – NASA astronaut
- Craig Venter (1964) – Scientist

== See also ==
- San Mateo County high schools
