= Hillsdale High School (San Mateo, California) =

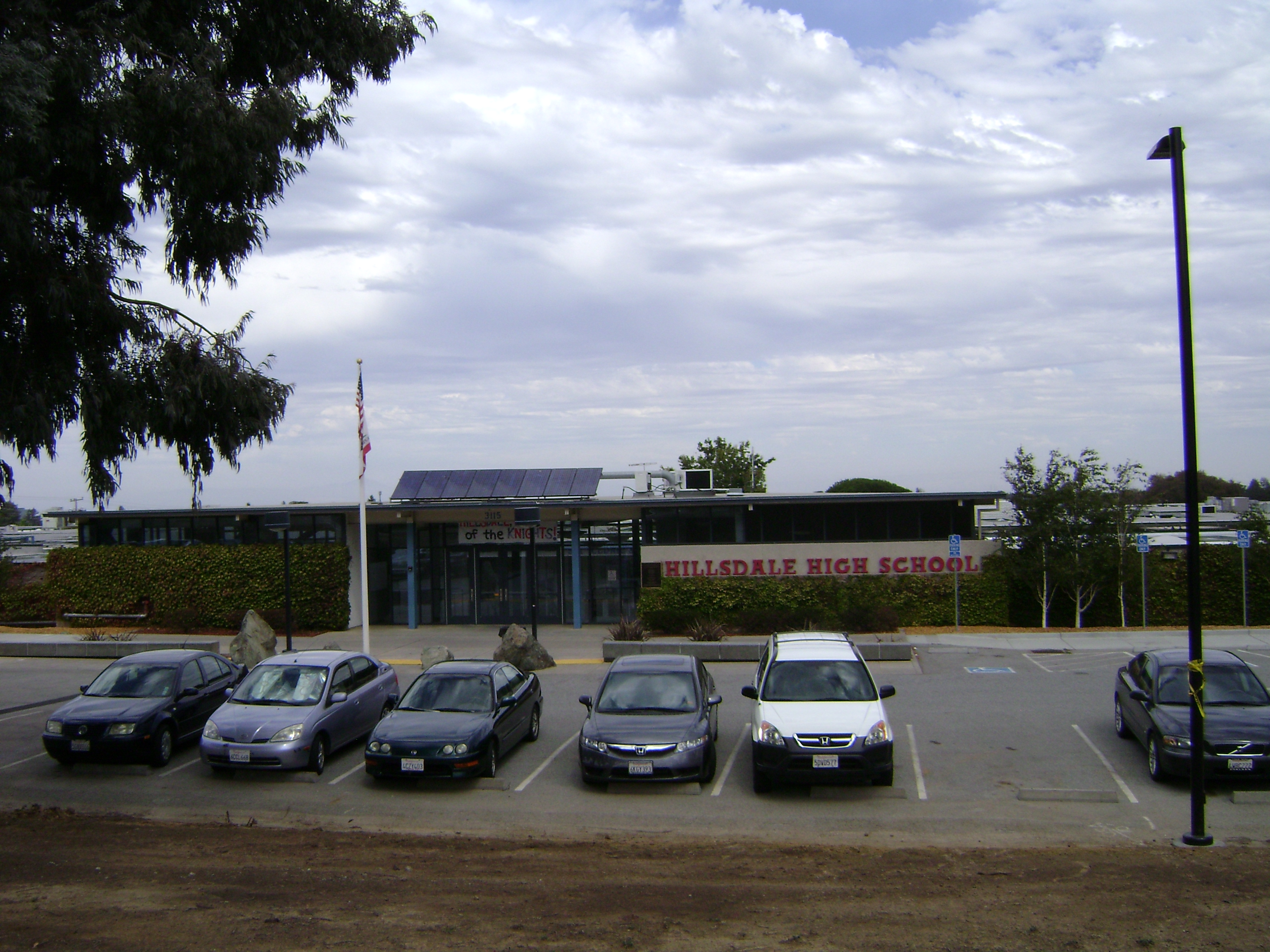

Location
- 3115 Del Monte Street; San Mateo, California 94403; United States; 37°31′57″N 122°18′46″W

Information
- Type: Public Secondary
- Established: 1955
- Principal: Jeff Gilbert
- Teaching staff: 88.46 (FTE)
- Grades: 9–12
- Enrollment: 1,581 (2023-2024)
- Student to teacher ratio: 18.29
- Campus: Suburban
- Colors: Columbia Blue, Scarlet Red
- Athletics conference: Peninsula Athletic League
- Team name: Fighting Knights
- Rival: Aragon High School
- Newspaper: Hillsdale Scroll
- Yearbook: The Hillsdale Shield
- Website: www.smuhsd.org/hillsdalehigh

Hillsdale High School is a public co-educational high school in San Mateo, California, serving grades 9–12 as part of the San Mateo Union High School District. Hillsdale generally serves the residents of San Mateo and Foster City. The main feeder schools to Hillsdale are Abbott, Bayside, Borel, and Bowditch Middle Schools of the San Mateo-Foster City School District.

== History ==
When it opened in 1955, Hillsdale High School was awarded the School Design Award from the American Institute of Architects. It served as the prototype for Bay Area high schools, with indoor/outdoor passages, landscaped courtyards, and skylights in classrooms. The design is credited to John Lyon Reid.

In the late 1980s and early 1990s, teachers Greg Jouriles and Sue Bedford developed and implemented an integrated humanities curriculum, scheduling social studies and English classes back-to-back. The extended periods were first rolled out to first-year honors students in 1989, followed by a parallel program implemented by Christine Del Gaudio and Marty Kongsle for the remaining first-year students in 1992. 1994 marked the start of the annual Battle at Dawn, a re-enactment of the Battle of Neuve Chapelle for first-year students at HHS as part of their studies about World War I.

In 1996, HHS proposed implementing a senior exhibition as a graduation requirement to pass fourth-year English classes. Students would have to defend a fifteen-page thesis before a three-member panel for their senior exhibition, which drew attention from parents concerned their children would not pass. The senior exhibition requirement was implemented in 1997, and the review of multiple drafts added a substantial load to teachers' grading burden, including one-on-one assistance and mentoring. As a result, a tutorial period was added to the teachers' schedules in 1999, and the English, social studies, and math teachers collaborated to create the Reflective, Eager, Aspiring, Learning Masters (REALM) program to help personalize instruction. Jeff Gilbert left HHS in 2001 to join the Stanford Teacher Education Program, introducing the two schools, and Stanford faculty entered into a Professional Development School relationship with HHS in the fall of 2001.

In the early 2000s, HHS won multiple grants to transform school culture into small learning communities (SLC), an approach championed by Linda Darling-Hammond, who had introduced HHS faculty to the concept during a professional development day in January 2002. The planning for SLCs at HHS was funded by a spring 2002 federal grant which culminated in Coyote Point Day, a two-day discussion and planning session held offsite at Coyote Point Park in November 2002.

Under the SLC model, incoming first-year students at HHS are divided into three houses (Florence, Kyoto, and Oaxaca), named for important medieval centers of learning; each house has approximately 100 students, who stay with a common set of teachers covering math, English, social science, and science for two years. Between their second and third years, students are reorganized into three upper-division houses (Cusco, Jakarta, and Timbuktu), where they remain for their final two years. Students take elective and advanced placement courses outside their houses.

On August 24, 2009, two pipe bombs were detonated in a hallway of Hillsdale High School during the beginning of the day's classes. No one was injured. Nobody was injured from the explosions. Alex Youshock, then a 17-year-old former student of the school, was held by staff members. Youshock was convicted for the attack and sentenced to nearly 25 years of prison.

== Campus ==
SMUHSD residents approved Measure D in 2000 and Measure M in 2006, which directly funded the repair and modernization of District schools, including Hillsdale.

== Statistics ==
=== Demographics ===
2022-2023 1,645 students: 845 male (51%), 800 female (49%)

Latino/Hispanic	White	Asian	Two or More Races	African American	Pacific Islander	American Indian
573	522	334	169	24	19	4
34.8%	31.7%	20.3%	10.3%	1.5%	1.2%	0.2%

== Athletics ==
Hillsdale participates in the Peninsula Athletic League (PAL) in the following sports:

- Cross country
- Football
- Golf
- Tennis
- Volleyball
- Water Polo
- Basketball
- Soccer
- Wrestling
- Badminton
- Softball
- Swimming
- Track and Field
- Baseball
- Lacrosse

== Awards ==
Hillsdale High School has received a number of awards and honors:

- 1955 American Institute of Architects School Design award for its Neo-Brutalist style
- 1990 "Best of San Mateo County" by the San Mateo County Times
- 1993 Named a United States Department of Education, National Blue Ribbon School
- 2001 Stanford Graduate School of Education's first Professional Development School
- 2007 Named a California Distinguished School
- 2009–2010 The Mock Trial team won first place in the California State Mock Trial Championship (and ultimately placed 19th at the national competition in Philadelphia, PA)
- 2011 Ranked no. 225 in the Newsweek Top 1,000 Public High Schools
- 2016 Received Gold Recognition from Schools of Opportunity

== Notable alumni ==
- Frankie Corbett, badminton player, multi-time Pan American Badminton Championships medalist
- Valerie Fleming, Olympic Silver Medalist and World Cup Champion bobsledder
- Billy Hardwick, Bowling Hall of Fame
- John Holdren, scientist, director of the White House Office of Science and Technology Policy, co-chair of the President's Council of Advisors on Science and Technology
- Karen Kraft, two-time Olympic Medalist in women's rowing
- Jay Mathews, author and education columnist with The Washington Post
- J. Michael McGinnis, physician and public health scholar
- Jed Rose, credited with co-inventing the nicotine patch
- Thomas Schumacher, theatrical producer
- Nick Vanos (d. 1987), former NBA player with the Phoenix Suns
- David Yarnold, former assistant managing editor of the San Jose Mercury News and president and CEO of the National Audubon Society

== See also ==
- San Mateo County high schools
