= Capuchino High School =

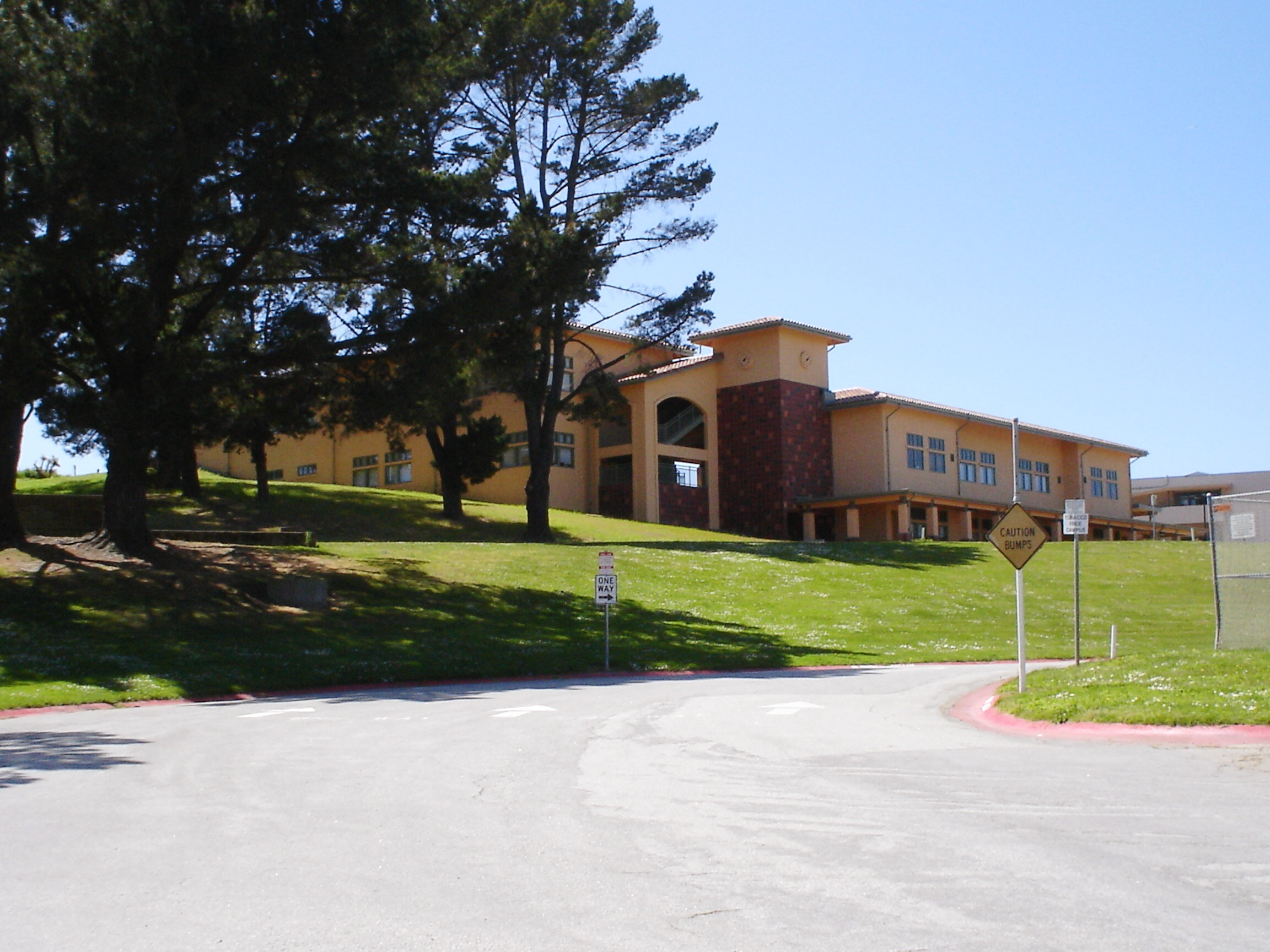
- Administration building in 2007

Location
- 1501 Magnolia Avenue; San Francisco Peninsula; San Bruno, San Mateo County, California 94066; United States
- Coordinates: 37°36′35″N 122°24′25″W

Information
- School type: Public
- Established: 1950
- School district: San Mateo Union High School District
- Principal: Jose A. Gomez
- Staff: 57.82 (on an FTE basis)
- Grades: 9-12
- Enrollment: 1,108 (2023–2024)
- Average class size: 36
- Student to teacher ratio: 19.16
- Colors: Green and gold
- Team name: The Mustangs
- Feeder schools: Parkside Intermediate
- Website: https://www.smuhsd.org/capuchinohigh

Capuchino High School is a public high school in San Bruno, California, United States. It is one of seven high schools in the San Mateo Union High School District, a division of the San Mateo County Office of Education.

== History ==
The physical campus, which is just over 34 acres (140,000 m^{2}) in size, was formerly the Spanish Rancho del Capuchino. The school opened in September 1950. There was initially only one two-story building on the campus; by 1953 most of the campus was completed. A 1,000-seat auditorium was built in 1959, supplementing the school's little theatre.

In 1963, KPIX (Channel 5) filmed scenes, including a pep rally, at the school for its weekly High School Salute program. Host Dick Stewart also interviewed students and faculty in the KPIX studios during the telecast.

In 1976, student Paula Baxter went missing after leaving the high school following a play rehearsal. Her body, which had been stabbed and sexually assaulted, was found two days later behind a church in Millbrae.

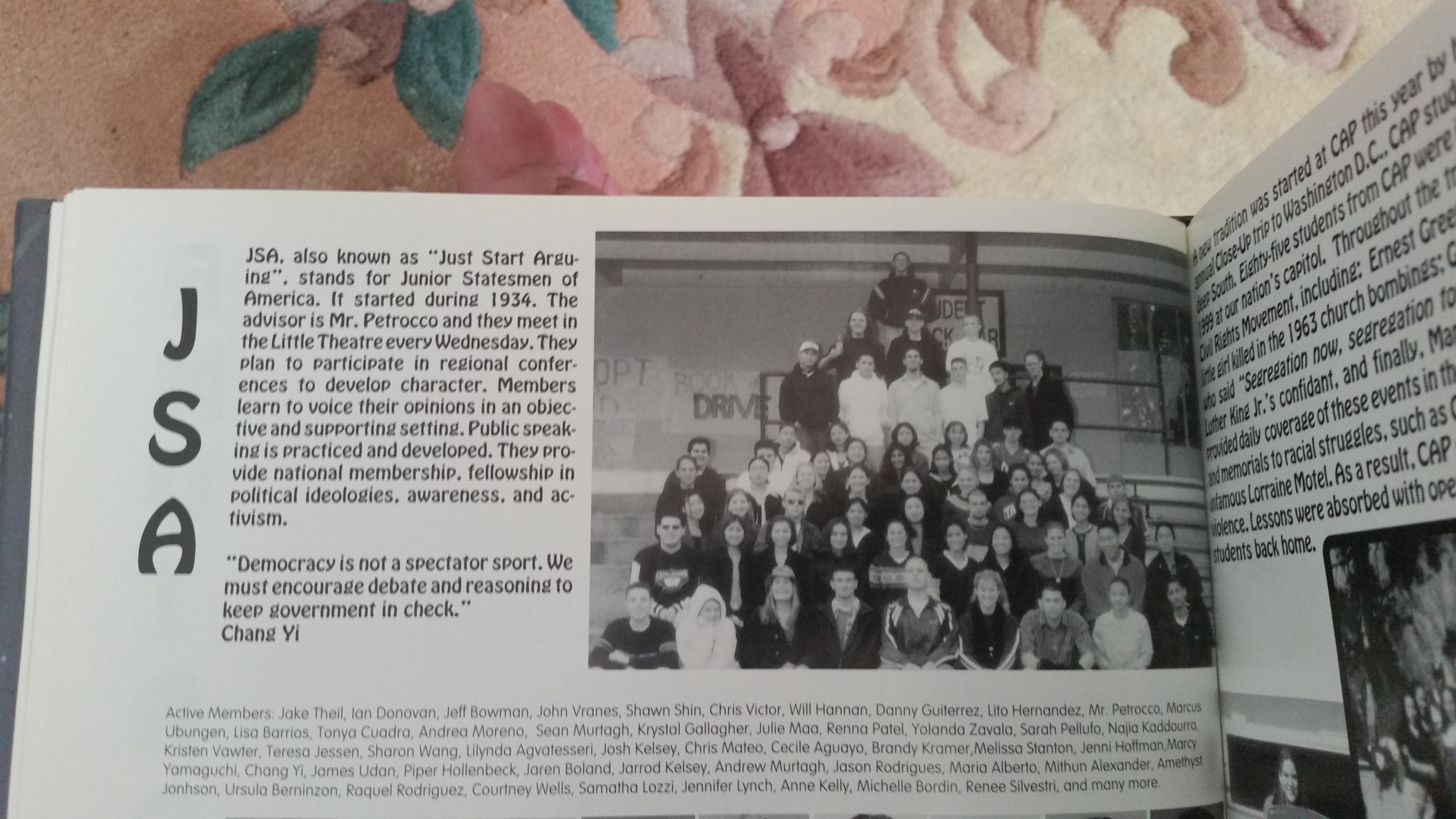
A yearbook photo from 1999.

SMUHSD residents approved Measure D in November 2000, which authorized funding for school renovation and modernization. Capuchino has a renovated science wing, a new spirit court and cafeteria building, and several new classrooms adjoining the new administration building.

Measure M funds were approved by SMUHSD voters in 2006 which in part funded the construction of a new humanities, arts, and sciences building (HASB) and theater remodel. In April 2012 the new HASB was completed and students moved in to finish their school year.

== Sports ==
Capuchino has long had an outstanding athletic department. It initially competed in the Peninsula Athletic League, which stretched from Jefferson High School in Daly City to Lincoln High School in San Jose. As more high schools were built during the 1950s and early 1960s, the Mid-Peninsula was established to include the seven high schools of the San Mateo Union High School District.

In the 1990s, Capuchino's girls' softball team won five consecutive Central Coast Section (CCS) Championships (1993–1997), and was state ranked on three occasions during this period. Capuchino also has a 32–9 Central Coast Section Playoff record, giving it the second best winning percentage of all schools in the section.

== Statistics ==
=== Demographics ===
2021–2022

- 1,123 students: 567 male (50.5%), 556 female (49.5%)

Hispanic	White	Asian	Two or more races	Pacific Islander	African American	American Indian
546	193	232	92	48	11	1
48.6%	17.2%	20.7%	8.2%	4.3%	1%	0.1%

Approximately 32.1% of the students at Capuchino are served by the free or reduced-price lunch program.

=== Standardized testing ===
SAT scores for 2014–2015
	Critical Reading average	Math average	Writing average
Capuchino High	495	508	487
District	544	570	544
Statewide	489	500	484

2013 Academic Performance Index
2009 base API	2013 growth API	Growth in the API from 2009 to 2013
714	791	77

== Notable alumni ==
=== Alumni ===
- Steve Oppermann, 1958, former PGA Tour professional
- Luana De Vol, 1960, opera singer
- Bill Neukom, 1960, Managing General Partner of the San Francisco Giants
- Billee Patricia Daniels, 1961, former Olympian
- Wally Bunker, 1963, former MLB player
- Keith Chapman , 1963, concert organist
- Suzanne Somers, 1964, actress
- Neal Dahlen, former Denver Broncos general manager
- Keith Hernandez, 1971, former MLB player
- Darrell Steinberg, 1977, mayor of Sacramento

=== Faculty ===
- Leo Ryan, history teacher and politician, 1961

== See also ==
- San Mateo County high schools
