= Academic Performance Index (California public schools) =

Last 5 years

The Academic Performance Index (API) was a measurement of academic performance and progress of individual schools in California, United States. The API was one of the main components of the Public Schools Accountability Act passed by the California State Legislature in 1999. It was last updated for the 2012–2013 school year, and on March 15, 2017, the California State Board of Education and the California Department of Education launched a new accountability system to replace the Academic Performance Index to better measure California's education goals. The replacement reporting interface is the California School Dashboard.

== API scores ==
=== Numeric Index ===
A numeric API score ranged from a low of 200 to a high of 1000. The interim statewide API performance target for all schools was 800. A school's growth was measured by how well it was moving toward or past that goal.

An API score was calculated for all students in a school as well as numerous API scores for each subgroup at the school (such as by race, English Learner Status, students with disabilities, and socioeconomically disadvantaged pupils).

=== Rankings ===
The API Statewide Rank score ranked a school with all schools in California based on API score, while the API Similar Schools score ranked a school with 100 other schools in the state with similar demographic profiles (including parent education level, poverty level, student mobility, student ethnicity).

Each rank ranged from 1 to 10, with a score of 10 meaning that the school's API fell into the top 10%.

== Indicator of performance ==
A school's score or placement on the API was designed to be an indicator of a school's performance level and was calculated annually by the California Department of Education, primarily based on CST and CAHSEE tests.

Due to the API's heavy reliance on standardized testing (although some factors such as attendance and graduation rates were considered), many criticisms of standardized testing could also be leveled at the reliability and accuracy of API scores as an indicator of a school's level of "academic achievement."

== Accountability ==
The API was closely tied to monetary and incentive awards by setting Annual Percent Growth Targets for each school and whether the school met or exceeded this goal. The Public Schools Accountability Act also established The Immediate Intervention/Underperforming Schools Program and the Governor's High Achieving/Improving Schools Program.

In addition, the API was used to determine Adequate Yearly Progress as a part of the No Child Left Behind Act.
