= San Bruno Education Foundation =

- Abbreviation: SBEF
- Formation: 3 February 2004
- Tax ID no.: 20-1051818
- Location: San Bruno, California
- Region served: San Bruno Park School District
- Website: www.sbefkids.org

The San Bruno Education Foundation is a privately funded, non-profit charity 501(c)(3) based in San Bruno, California.

== Mission statement ==
The San Bruno Education Foundation's official mission statement is:

We strengthen public education for all San Bruno Park School District children through community partnerships, advocacy, and resource support.
