= Millbrae, California =

City in California, United States

- City
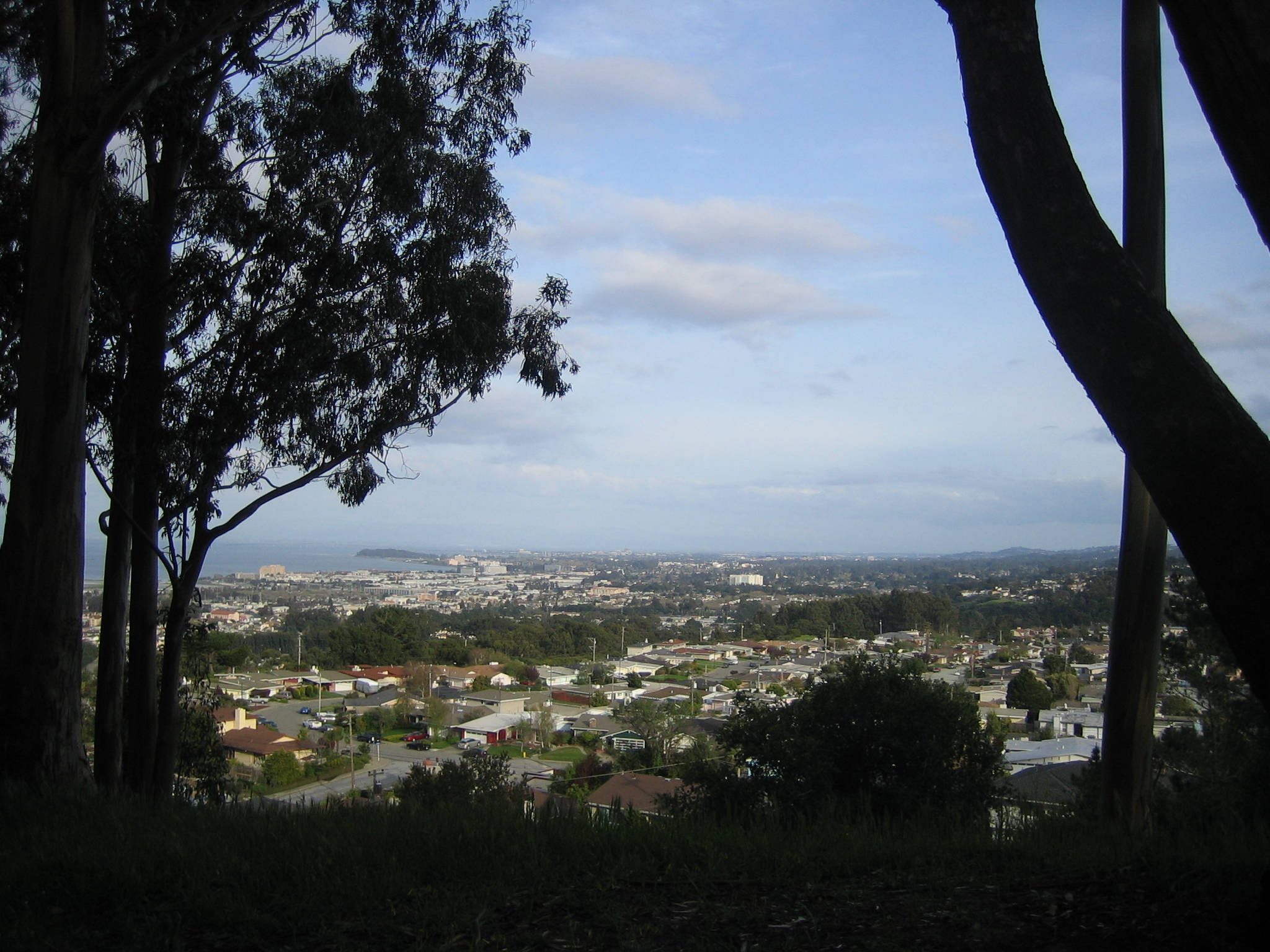
- View of Millbrae, facing southeast from Junipero Serra Park, with SFO runways, the Westin SFO, and Millbrae station visible behind the trees on the left, Coyote Point Recreation Area and the San Mateo–Hayward Bridge visible behind them, The Magnolia of Millbrae, Mills-Peninsula Medical Center visible near the center of the image, and the Santa Cruz Mountains and the suburbs in their foothills on the right.

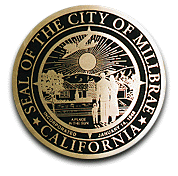
- Seal
- Motto: A City In The Sun
- Interactive map of Millbrae, California
- Location in the United States
- Coordinates: 37°36′3″N 122°24′5″W
- Country: United States
- State: California
- County: San Mateo
- Incorporated: January 14, 1948
- Named for: Darius Ogden Mills

Government
  - Type: Council–manager
  - Mayor: Anders Fung (preceded by Ann Schneider)

Area
  - Total: 3.29 sq mi (8.53 km^{2})
  - Land: 3.27 sq mi (8.47 km^{2})
  - Water: 0.023 sq mi (0.06 km^{2}) 0.72%
- Elevation: 33 ft (10 m)

Population (2020)
  - Total: 23,216
  - Density: 6,851/sq mi (2,645.2/km^{2})
- Time zone: UTC-8 (Pacific)
  - Summer (DST): UTC-7 (PDT)
- ZIP code: 94030
- Area code: 650
- FIPS code: 06-47486
- GNIS feature ID: 1659756
- Website: www.ci.millbrae.ca.us

Millbrae is a city in northern San Mateo County, California, United States. To the northeast is San Francisco International Airport; San Bruno is to the northwest, and Burlingame is to the southeast. It is bordered by San Andreas Lake to the southwest. The population was 23,216 at the 2020 census.

== History ==
The oral tradition of the Ohlone people suggests they have been living in the Bay Area for thousands of years. Anthropological evidence suggests Ohlone ethnogenesis occurred around 700 CE following a wave of migration from the Central Valley. The local Ohlone people are today called the Ramaytush Ohlone; however, this name is a linguistic designation that arose relatively recently. Prior to colonization, the Ohlone did not operate as a single consolidated unit; they identified more with their local tribe and village than with the nation at large. The several local tribes that lived in the area prior to colonization coalesced into the modern Ramaytush people following the precipitous decline of their population in the 1800s. The closest villages to what is now Millbrae were located by the banks of San Bruno Creek, and they are known as Urebure and Siplichiquin. A third nearby village—whose original name is unknown—is called CA-SMA-299.

=== 1500s ===
Anthropological evidence and oral tradition indicate the Ohlone people were living in the Bay Area prior to the 1500s. The Spanish empire claimed much of what is now the United States during the early period of Spanish colonization of the Americas. In 1535, the Spanish empire established the kingdom of New Spain, which inherited the empire's claims to much of what is now the western United States.

In 1542, Juan Rodríguez Cabrillo explored the Pacific coast near what is today Millbrae, though the expedition did not see the Golden Gate or the San Francisco Bay, likely due to the San Francisco fog. The Ohlone people may have met this expedition as they explored the Monterey Bay, about 50 miles southeast of Millbrae.

In 1595, Philip II of Spain tasked Sebastião Rodrigues Soromenho with mapping the west coast of the Americas. Soromenho set sail on Manila Galleon San Agustin on July 5, 1595, and in early November they reached land between Point St. George and Trinidad Head. The expedition followed the coast southward and on November 7 the San Agustin anchored in Drakes Bay, about 40 miles northwest of Millbrae. In late November, a storm sank the San Agustin and killed between 7 and 12 people. On December 8, 80 remaining crew members set sail on the San Buenaventura, a launch which was partially constructed en route from the Philippines. Seeking the fastest route south, the expedition failed to notice the Golden Gate, arriving at Puerto de Chacala, Mexico on January 17, 1596.

=== 1600s ===
In 1601, New Spain tasked Sebastián Vizcaíno with mapping the California coastline in detail and locating safe harbors in Alta California for Manila Galleons to use on their return voyage to Acapulco from Manila. In 1602, members of Vizcaíno's expedition explored as far north as Coos Bay, however like previous expeditions, they missed the Golden Gate. In 1603, this expedition landed in Monterey Bay, about 50 miles southeast of Millbrae, leading to the first documented interaction between the Ohlone people and European explorers. Little came of this expedition, and for the next 150 years, Alta California remained a distant frontier land, largely outside of the kingdom's control, despite its claims. Anthropological evidence and oral tradition indicate the Ohlone people were living in the Bay Area throughout this time.

=== 1700s ===
The San Francisco Bay may have been explored and mapped in the early 1700s. José Cabrera Bueno's 1734 Navegación Espéculativa y Práctica describe it with the following:

Through the opening in the center enters an estuary of salt water without any breaking of the waves at all, and by going in one will find friendly Indians and can easily take on water and wood.

On November 4, 1769, the Portolà expedition climbed Sweeney Ridge and descended southeast parallel to San Andreas Creek before camping overnight near what is today San Andreas Lake and Millbrae's western border. The Portolà expedition continued southeast along the peninsula before turning back and returning to San Diego.

Gaspar de Portolá returned to the Bay Area the following year, accompanied by Junípero Serra, who established Mission San Carlos Borromeo de Carmelo—the second Spanish mission in Alta California—in what is today Monterey on June 3, 1770. Between 1769 and 1824 a total of 21 missions were established across Alta California.

The sixth Spanish mission in Alta California, Mission San Francisco de Asís was established on October 9, 1776, in what is today San Francisco's Mission District, about 10 miles north of Millbrae. Over the next few decades, many of the Ohlone people who lived in and around what is today Millbrae relocated to Mission San Francisco de Asís, where they were baptized. Nearly all the Indigenous people of the area around what is today Millbrae were baptized between 1777 and 1783, and by 1793, the 8 village sites in what are today San Francisco and northern San Mateo county had been abandoned and most of the Indigenous people of that area had relocated to Mission San Francisco.

The missions maintained authority over much of Alta California even after Mexico's independence from Spain 1821.

=== 1800s ===
The First Mexican Empire came and went with little change for residents of the area. The First Mexican Republic was established in 1824, and one of the most significant changes came when José María de Echeandía, Governor of Alta California, issued a "Proclamation of Emancipation" (or "Prevenciónes de Emancipacion") on July 25, 1826. Following this proclamation, the Indigenous people within the military districts of San Diego, Santa Barbara, and Monterey who were found qualified were freed from missionary rule and made eligible to become Mexican citizens. In 1827, Echeandía granted permission for sub-lieutenant José Antonio Sánchez to occupy Mission San Francisco's Rancho Buri Buri—which included parts of present-day Millbrae and Burlingame—for “grazing and agricultural purposes."

The Mexican Secularization Act of 1833 opened the lands of nearby Mission Dolores to civilian settlement, and the small town of Yerba Buena, which later changed its name to San Francisco, was established that year. Settlement was slow however; in 1847 San Francisco was said to have only 459 residents. Few people lived in what is now Millbrae at this time, likely only a few Californio families. California came under American rule in 1848 following the Mexican–American War, the Treaty of Guadalupe Hidalgo, and the Mexican Cession and California became the 31st state in of the United States in 1850. The discovery of gold relatively nearby in 1848 led to massive population growth, with San Francisco's population growing 5446% in just a few years, from 459 residents in 1847 to 25,000 in 1850. San Francisco County was one of the state's 18 original counties established at California statehood in 1850, however in 1856, the California state government divided the county. A straight line was then drawn across the tip of the San Francisco Peninsula just north of San Bruno Mountain, and everything south of the line became the new San Mateo County while everything north of the line became the new consolidated City and County of San Francisco.

In the 1860s, Darius Ogden Mills purchased a portion of Rancho Buri Buri from José de la Cruz Sánchez to build a country estate. The San Francisco and San Jose Railroad, predecessor to Caltrain, began operations in 1863, directly connecting Millbrae and other peninsula towns to Market Street, with service extending to San Jose in 1864. In 1872, members of the Sánchez family built the original Sixteen Mile House, a historical restaurant and rest stop near the Mills estate, and direct link to Millbrae's early days. The Mills estate was bordered by what is now Skyline Boulevard, U.S. Route 101 (the Bayshore Freeway), Millbrae Avenue and Trousdale Drive. The estate became known as "Millbrae" from "Mills" and the Scottish word "brae," which means "rolling hills" or "hill slope." Millbrae grew slowly during the 19th century; according to the 1890 US Census, the town had only 243 residents.

=== 1900s ===
The early 20th century saw rapid growth in Millbrae's population, which increased 3692% from 243 in 1890 to 8,972 in 1950. Transportation has shaped Millbrae's growth; Legislative Route Number (LRN) 2, which is today known as California State Route 82 or El Camino Real, was established in 1909 largely parallel to the San Francisco and San Jose Railroad, and in 1919, Skyline Boulevard, which runs along Millbrae's western boundary, was established as LRN 55, connecting San Francisco and Santa Cruz via the foothills of the Santa Cruz Mountains. Construction on the Bayshore Freeway, which runs parallel to El Camino and the SF&SJ railroad tracks, began in 1924 and by 1929, it connected Millbrae with the East Bay via the newly completed San Mateo-Hayward Bridge. Southern Pacific double tracked the SF&SJ railroad in 1904 and by the 1940s, 26 trains ran between SF and SJ per day, with headways as low as 5 minutes (traveling north) in the mornings and 3 minutes (traveling south) in the evening. Additionally, until 1948, Muni's #40 "interurban" streetcar traveled through Millbrae, providing passenger rail service between San Francisco and San Mateo.

Millbrae's Green Hills Country Club was built in 1929 and designed by famed golf course architect Dr. Alister MacKenzie, who also designed other noteworthy courses such as Augusta National, Cypress Point, Royal Melbourne, and Pasatiempo. The course was originally known as the Union League Golf Club of San Francisco (1930 to 1933) and Millbrae Country Club (1933 to 1945). The course provides a green belt in the center of the city that is the home of many animals, such as the red-tail fox, that otherwise would not be able to survive in the urban setting. It also may be the only area of the city where natural creeks still flow above ground.

In 1931, citizens organized a volunteer fire department, which remained entirely volunteer until 1938. The police and fire departments were housed together for several years at Hillcrest Boulevard and El Camino Real before the vital services moved to their permanent location in Millbrae's civic center, a few blocks west of El Camino. Millbrae used a private patrol financed by fees from merchants and residents until 1941, when the San Mateo County Board of Supervisors created the Millbrae Police District. Records of the Internal Revenue Service document the licensing of several Millbrae bars for gambling; only after incorporation were gambling laws enforced in Millbrae and not until the 1950s was gambling defeated.

In the 1940s, a hilltop was shaved away to produce landfill for the expanding San Francisco Airport, which received an "international" designation in 1954 with the completion of the Central Terminal. Spurred largely by the desire to secure the Mills estate for residential use and by the efforts of Millbrae's weekly newspaper, the Millbrae Sun, residents heatedly discussed incorporation for over a decade before voting to incorporate. Finally, on January 14, 1948, residents of Millbrae traveled to Sacramento to present their new city's charter. W.F. Leutenegger was elected mayor to represent Millbrae's nearly 8,000 residents. That year, Green Hills Elementary School opened as Millbrae's first new school in over 25 years, in anticipation of the educational needs of the post-war "baby boom" children. The new city's chief industries were agriculture, floriculture, dairy, and porcelain manufacturing.

In the 1950s, Millbrae residents united to resist efforts to divide the city by the planned Junipero Serra Freeway (I-280), which was later routed parallel to Junipero Serra Boulevard, then through a canyon in San Bruno up to Skyline Boulevard. The streetcar line that connected Millbrae with San Francisco and San Mateo was dismantled just after Millbrae's incorporation in 1948, leaving the Southern Pacific Railroad as the only railway linking Millbrae with surrounding areas. Millbrae's high school students rode the streetcar to attend Burlingame High School until Capuchino High School opened on September 11, 1950. The original Sixteen Mile House was located where Millbrae O'Reilly Auto Parts stands today, at the intersection of El Camino Real and Center Street. The Millbrae estate mansion burned down in June 1954. After the fire the estate was subdivided and sold, with the bulk of the land going to the Paul W. Trousdale Construction Company in 1953 and eventually becoming the location for Mills High School, Spring Valley Elementary School, and Peninsula Hospital.

An unsuccessful effort to save the original Sixteen Mile House in the 1970s led to the birth of the Millbrae Historical Society and eventual successful crusades to save the Millbrae train station and the historic building that has become the Millbrae Historical Museum. Such challenges, though inevitable, have only strengthened Millbrae's resolve to preserve the city's unique character and rich history.

Millbrae's population skyrocketed for decades, increasing 10728% from 195 residents in 1880 to just shy of 21,000 in 1970, however the population decreased 4.1% between 1970 and 1980, and Millbrae would not reach its 1970 peak again until after the 2000 census.

=== 2000s ===
Following its population loss in the 1970s, and its negligible growth in the 1980s and '90s, Millbrae's population began to rebound in the early 21st century. The population of Millbrae was 20,718 at the 2000 census, 21,532 at the 2010 census, and 23,216 at the 2020 census. This growth may be attributed to a recent shift towards constructing transit-oriented development; in 1998, Millbrae created an area-specific plan for the Millbrae station area, in 2007, a lot near Millbrae station with surface parking and a large single story retail building was redeveloped into the condo buildings at 88 S. Broadway, in 2010 a large surface parking lot with two small retail buildings across El Camino Real from Millbrae station was redeveloped as the Belamor Condo Buildings. and in 2023, three large surface parking lots adjacent to Millbrae station were redeveloped as the Gateway at Millbrae, which maintained some surface parking, and created a new hotel, a new office building, and two new apartment buildings—one of which features ground-floor retail space. Several chains including Chick-fil-A, Panda Express, Crumbl Cookies, and Starbucks have signed leases to move into the new retail space at the Gateway.

Transportation continues to be a large driver of Millbrae's growth; SFO has become one of the busiest airports in the world, Junipero Serra Freeway, El Camino Real, and the Bayshore Freeway remain major thoroughfares between San Francisco and San Jose, and since 2003 Millbrae station has been the only station served by both BART and Caltrain. Millbrae station is also the only planned California High-Speed Rail stop between San Francisco and San José. In 2023, SamTrans announced that it would move its headquarters from San Carlos to the new office building at the Gateway at Millbrae, and in 2024, Caltrain, whose headquarters was in the same San Carlos building as SamTrans, announced that they would join SamTrans in relocating to the new office building at the Gateway. Millbrae nevertheless largely remains a bedroom community whose residents commute to jobs in various industries throughout the Bay Area.

In addition to the increasing awareness that came with becoming a BART terminus in the early 2000s, the city gained notoriety in the early 2020s following spats with the California High-Speed Rail Authority and the San Mateo County government, as well as a possible hate crime targeting then councilmember Anders Fung.

== Geography ==
Millbrae has a total area of 3.29 sq mi (8.5 km^{2}), of which 3.27 sq mi (8.5 km^{2}) is land and 0.02 sq mi (0.1 km^{2}), comprising 0.72%, is water.

== Climate ==
According to the National Weather Service, Millbrae enjoys a typical Mediterranean climate featuring cool, wet winters and dry, mild summers. Night and morning fog are common during the summer months. Frequent, westerly sea breezes keep temperatures relatively mild throughout the year with highs in the mid-to-upper fifties (~15 °C) and lows in the mid-to-upper forties (~8 °C) during the winter and highs in the low seventies (~22 °C) and lows in the mid-to-upper fifties (~13 °C) during the summer. Annual precipitation ranges from 20 inches (510 mm) in the lowlands to 32 inches (810 mm) in the hills near Skyline Boulevard and I-280; most of the rain falls from November through April. Snow is very rare; the last measurable occurrence was on February 5, 1976. The nearest National Weather Service station is at the nearby San Francisco International Airport, where records go back to early 1927. For more details, see San Bruno, California.

Climate data for Millbrae, California
Month	Jan	Feb	Mar	Apr	May	Jun	Jul	Aug	Sep	Oct	Nov	Dec	Year
Record high °F (°C)	74 (23)	78 (26)	82 (28)	93 (34)	95 (35)	98 (37)	100 (38)	96 (36)	106 (41)	102 (39)	81 (27)	73 (23)	106 (41)
Mean daily maximum °F (°C)	57.3 (14.1)	59.4 (15.2)	61.2 (16.2)	63.7 (17.6)	65.6 (18.7)	68.7 (20.4)	71.7 (22.1)	72.6 (22.6)	73.5 (23.1)	70.2 (21.2)	62.2 (16.8)	56.9 (13.8)	65.3 (18.5)
Mean daily minimum °F (°C)	48.3 (9.1)	48.5 (9.2)	50.1 (10.1)	52.3 (11.3)	53.9 (12.2)	55.7 (13.2)	57.8 (14.3)	58.6 (14.8)	58.8 (14.9)	56.2 (13.4)	52.3 (11.3)	48.2 (9.0)	53.4 (11.9)
Record low °F (°C)	32 (0)	27 (−3)	33 (1)	37 (3)	38 (3)	44 (7)	42 (6)	40 (4)	45 (7)	40 (4)	31 (−1)	23 (−5)	23 (−5)
Average precipitation inches (mm)	6.19 (157)	6.30 (160)	4.31 (109)	2.02 (51)	1.03 (26)	0.21 (5.3)	0.03 (0.76)	0.26 (6.6)	0.36 (9.1)	1.64 (42)	3.60 (91)	6.18 (157)	32.13 (814.76)
Source: "The Weather Channel

== Environmental features ==
A wetland area in the eastern part of the city which is adjacent to U.S. Highway 101 is habitat to the endangered San Francisco garter snake, a species endemic to San Mateo County. At the western edge of the city, the San Andreas Lake and the San Andreas Fault may be found.

== Demographics ==
Historical population
Census	Pop.	Note	%±
1880	195		—
1890	243		24.6%
1950	8,972		—
1960	15,873		76.9%
1970	20,920		31.8%
1980	20,058		−4.1%
1990	20,412		1.8%
2000	20,718		1.5%
2010	21,532		3.9%
2020	23,216		7.8%
U.S. Decennial Census; 1860–1870 1880-1890; 1900 1910 1920; 1930 1940 1950; 1960 1970 1980; 1990 2000 2010; 2020

=== Racial and ethnic composition ===
Millbrae city, California – Racial and ethnic composition Note: the US Census treats Hispanic/Latino as an ethnic category. This table excludes Latinos from the racial categories and assigns them to a separate category. Hispanics/Latinos may be of any race.
Race / Ethnicity (NH = Non-Hispanic)	Pop 2000	Pop 2010	Pop 2020	% 2000	% 2010	% 2020
White alone (NH)	11,674	8,736	6,867	56.35%	40.57%	29.58%
Black or African American alone (NH)	154	158	170	0.74%	0.73%	0.73%
Native American or Alaska Native alone (NH)	24	11	16	0.12%	0.05%	0.07%
Asian alone (NH)	5,614	9,155	12,155	27.10%	42.52%	52.36%
Native Hawaiian or Pacific Islander alone (NH)	227	197	216	1.10%	0.91%	0.93%
Other race alone (NH)	61	46	173	0.29%	0.21%	0.75%
Mixed race or Multiracial (NH)	588	674	998	2.84%	3.13%	4.30%
Hispanic or Latino (any race)	2,376	2,555	2,621	11.47%	11.87%	11.29%
Total	20,718	21,532	23,216	100.00%	100.00%	100.00%

Millbrae reached majority minority status in 2020.

=== 2020 census ===
As of the 2020 census, Millbrae had a population of 23,216. The population density was 7,101.9 inhabitants per square mile (2,742.1/km^{2}). Millbrae was 100.0% urban and 0.0% rural.

Racial composition as of the 2020 census
Race	Number	Percent
White	7,340	31.6%
Black or African American	172	0.7%
American Indian and Alaska Native	87	0.4%
Asian	12,238	52.7%
Native Hawaiian and Other Pacific Islander	230	1.0%
Some other race	1,070	4.6%
Two or more races	2,079	9.0%

The census reported that 99.1% of the population lived in households, 0.5% lived in non-institutionalized group quarters, and 0.3% were institutionalized.

There were 8,272 households, out of which 33.0% had children under the age of 18 living in them. Of all households, 58.4% were married-couple households, 4.5% were cohabiting-couple households, 23.5% had a female householder with no spouse or partner present, and 13.6% had a male householder with no spouse or partner present. About 20.5% of households were one person, and 11.7% had someone living alone who was 65 or older. The average household size was 2.78, and there were 6,053 families (73.2% of all households).

The age distribution was 19.5% under the age of 18, 7.0% aged 18 to 24, 25.8% aged 25 to 44, 27.8% aged 45 to 64, and 20.0% who were 65 years of age or older. The median age was 43.3 years. For every 100 females, there were 95.3 males, and for every 100 females age 18 and over there were 92.7 males.

There were 8,679 housing units, of which 4.7% were vacant. The homeowner vacancy rate was 0.8% and the rental vacancy rate was 4.0%. Of occupied units, 60.4% were owner-occupied and 39.6% were occupied by renters.

=== 2023 estimates ===
In 2023, the US Census Bureau estimated that 40.4% of the population were foreign-born. Of all people aged 5 or older, 51.2% spoke only English at home, 7.9% spoke Spanish, 5.7% spoke other Indo-European languages, 33.5% spoke Asian or Pacific Islander languages, and 1.7% spoke other languages. Of those aged 25 or older, 93.2% were high school graduates and 50.5% had a bachelor's degree.

The median household income in 2023 was $157,567, and the per capita income was $76,277. About 3.4% of families and 6.1% of the population were below the poverty line.

=== 2010 census ===
At the 2010 census Millbrae had a population of 21,532. The population density was 6,608.5 inhabitants per square mile (2,551.6/km^{2}). The racial makeup of Millbrae was 10,177 (47.3%) White, 179 (0.8%) African American, 33 (0.2%) Native American, 9,205 (42.8%) Asian, 214 (1.0%) Pacific Islander, 776 (3.6%) from other races, and 948 (4.4%) from two or more races. Hispanic or Latino of any race were 2,555 persons (11.9%).

The census reported that 21,217 people (98.5% of the population) lived in households, 58 (0.3%) lived in non-institutionalized group quarters, and 257 (1.2%) were institutionalized.

There were 7,994 households, 2,593 (32.4%) had children under the age of 18 living in them, 4,543 (56.8%) were opposite-sex married couples living together, 868 (10.9%) had a female householder with no husband present, 315 (3.9%) had a male householder with no wife present. There were 268 (3.4%) unmarried opposite-sex partnerships, and 40 (0.5%) same-sex married couples or partnerships. 1,883 households (23.6%) were one person and 1,059 (13.2%) had someone living alone who was 65 or older. The average household size was 2.65. There were 5,726 families (71.6% of households); the average family size was 3.15.

The age distribution was 4,337 people (20.1%) under the age of 18, 1,523 people (7.1%) aged 18 to 24, 4,960 people (23.0%) aged 25 to 44, 6,476 people (30.1%) aged 45 to 64, and 4,236 people (19.7%) who were 65 or older. The median age was 44.8 years. For every 100 females, there were 90.0 males. For every 100 females age 18 and over, there were 86.7 males.

There were 8,372 housing units at an average density of 2,569.5 per square mile, of the occupied units 5,076 (63.5%) were owner-occupied and 2,918 (36.5%) were rented. The homeowner vacancy rate was 0.7%; the rental vacancy rate was 4.8%. 13,968 people (64.9% of the population) lived in owner-occupied housing units and 7,249 people (33.7%) lived in rental housing units.

== Government ==
In the California State Legislature, Millbrae is in the 13th senatorial district, represented by Democrat Josh Becker, and in the 21st Assembly district, represented by Democrat Diane Papan.

In the United States House of Representatives, Millbrae is in California's 15th congressional district, represented by Democrat Kevin Mullin.

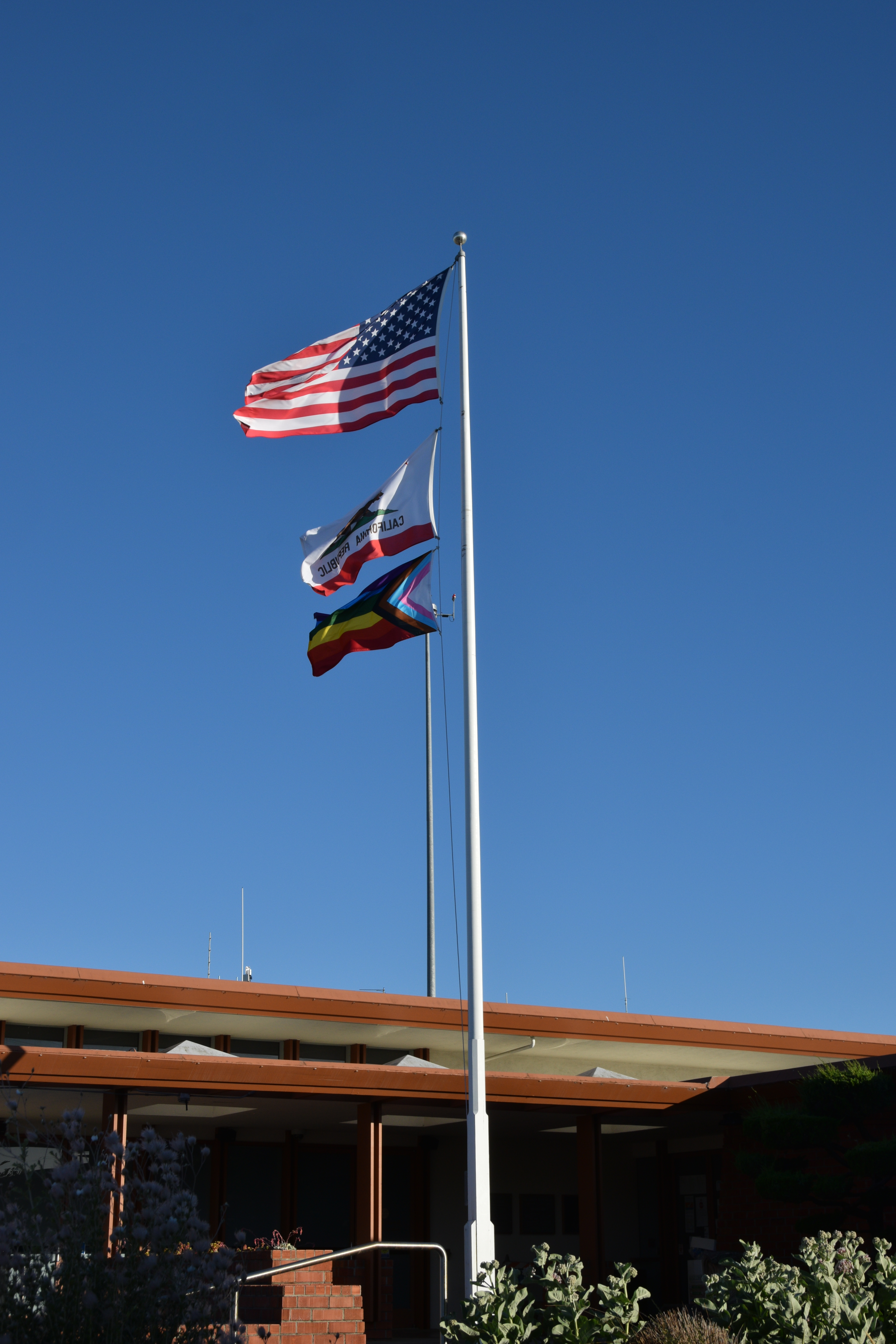
Millbrae City Hall flying (top to bottom) United States, California, & LGBTQ+ flags.

According to the California Secretary of State, as of February 10, 2019, Millbrae has 12,850 registered voters. Of those, 5,733 (44.6%) are registered Democrats, 2,049 (16%) are registered Republicans, and 4,584 (35.7%) have declined to state a political party.

Millbrae has 5 city council members, one of which is the mayor, and another the vice mayor. City council members serve 4 year terms; the mayor and vice mayor are elected by the council and serve 1 year terms. Prior to 2022, residents of the city voted for city council members at-large, however in 2022 Millbrae switched from at-large to district city council elections.

The city has generally allowed each city council member to serve as mayor and vice mayor, and the city council has generally chosen for the vice mayor to succeed the mayor, however a council member other than the vice mayor has been chosen as mayor several times since 2015. In 2023, the city council initiated plans to codify its procedure for mayoral succession, following the contentious mayoral elections of 2022 and 2023 which saw Gina Papan, sister of aforementioned Diane Papan, be skipped in line for mayoral succession. Despite the Millbrae municipal code stipulating that "no one may serve in the office of mayor for two consecutive terms," the city council selected Anders Fung as mayor for the second consecutive year on December 10, 2024.

== Education ==
Millbrae has a reputation for having good schools in the San Francisco Bay Area and in the state of California, despite enduring years of state budget cuts. Millbrae School District (MSD) oversees four public elementary schools including Meadows, Green Hills, Lomita Park, and Spring Valley and one middle school, Taylor Middle School. MSD is state-funded and does not receive local property taxes, and has endured budget cuts from the state since 2007. Millbrae has one public high school, Mills High School, which is part of the San Mateo Union High School District.

The city is served by the Millbrae Public Library of the San Mateo County Libraries, a member of the Peninsula Library System.

Millbrae has one private school at Saint Dunstan's, a Catholic church.

== Police and fire ==
On March 4, 2012, the San Mateo County Sheriff's Office took over responsibility for providing police services in Millbrae and closed the local police department.

On December 29, 2014, the City of Millbrae combined services with Central County Fire which provides fire services to the cities of Millbrae and Burlingame and the town of Hillsborough. Millbrae has two fire stations within its city limits.

== Transportation ==
=== Roads ===
U.S. Route 101 and Interstate 280 run near the eastern and western boundaries of the city, respectively. California State Route 82, known more commonly as El Camino Real, runs near the center of the city, including through its downtown.

=== Public transport ===
Millbrae station serves as a major transit hub for the Peninsula, connecting the Bay Area Rapid Transit (BART), Caltrain, and SamTrans networks. It is the terminus for BART's Red and Yellow lines and is the only place where BART lines directly connect to Caltrain.

=== Air transport ===
San Francisco International Airport, one of the world's busiest airports, is adjacent to the city and is directly accessible to Millbrae through both BART and road. Millbrae is also directly connected to Oakland International Airport via BART, and indirectly connected to San Jose International Airport via Caltrain and the Santa Clara Valley Transportation Authority's light rail and buses.

== Economy ==
Millbrae's economy is driven in part by its proximity to the city of San Francisco and its airport, SFO. The city hosts several hotels along El Camino Real, and near its bayshore park, just south of SFO. Downtown Millbrae, along El Camino and Broadway Avenue, is lined with small shops and restaurants that reflect the city's diversity, and Millbrae Square features several larger retailers.

=== Top employers ===
According to the city's 2025 Annual Comprehensive Financial Report, the top employers in the city are:

#	Employer	# of Employees
1	Westin Hotel	244
2	Millbrae School District	220
3	San Francisco Public Utilities Commission	191
4	City of Millbrae	148
5	Millbrae Care Center	133
6	Mills High School	127
7	Magnolia of Millbrae, Inc	123
8	Trader Joe's	109
9	Safeway	104
10	Cadence Living Milbrae	97

== Sister cities & Friendship cities ==
Millbrae has two sister cities, as designated by Sister Cities International:

- La Serena, Chile
- Mosta, Malta

Millbrae also has a friendship city agreement with Hanyu, Japan, Taishan, China, Ramallah, Palestine, and Dongguan, China.
