= Taylor Middle School =

Taylor Middle School may refer to:

- Taylor Middle School, in the Millbrae School District, California
- Taylor Middle School, in the Taylor Community School Corporation, Indiana
- Taylor Middle School, formerly in the Taylor School District, Michigan
- Taylor Middle School, in Albuquerque Public Schools, New Mexico
- Taylor Middle School, in the Taylor Independent School District, Texas
- Buddy Taylor Middle School, in Flagler County, Florida
- W. C. Taylor Middle School, in Fauquier County, Virginia
