= Romaine Welds =

Jamaican-American traveler

Romaine Welds (born 1985) is a Jamaican-American man who has visited every country in the world, making him the first Jamaican man to do so.

== Early life and career ==
Welds grew up in Jamaica before immigrating to the United States of America in 2007 at the age of 21. In the US he began working for an airline company. As of May 2023 he works for United Airlines as a ground operation agent at San Francisco International Airport.

== Travel ==
Welds first traveled by airplane in 2007, when he immigrated to the United States of America. He became interested in further travel after visiting Machu Picchu in Peru with a friend. After traveling within the United States, he began visiting other countries.

Due to his status as an airline employee, he does not pay for flights originating from the United States, only pays tax for international flights, and pays a discounted rate for other airlines, allowing him to travel more easily. Welds also works double shifts, in order to reach his work quotas for the month more quickly, allowing him to spend more time traveling.

By 2016 Welds had visited 100 countries, at which point he decided to travel to every country. The final country he visited, on September 18, 2022, was Antiqua and Barbuda. Welds has said his next travel goal may be to visit all fifty US states.

== Personal life ==
Welds lives in San Bruno, California.

== See also ==
- Black Travel Movement
