= Junipero Serra County Park =

Park in California, United States

Junipero Serra Park
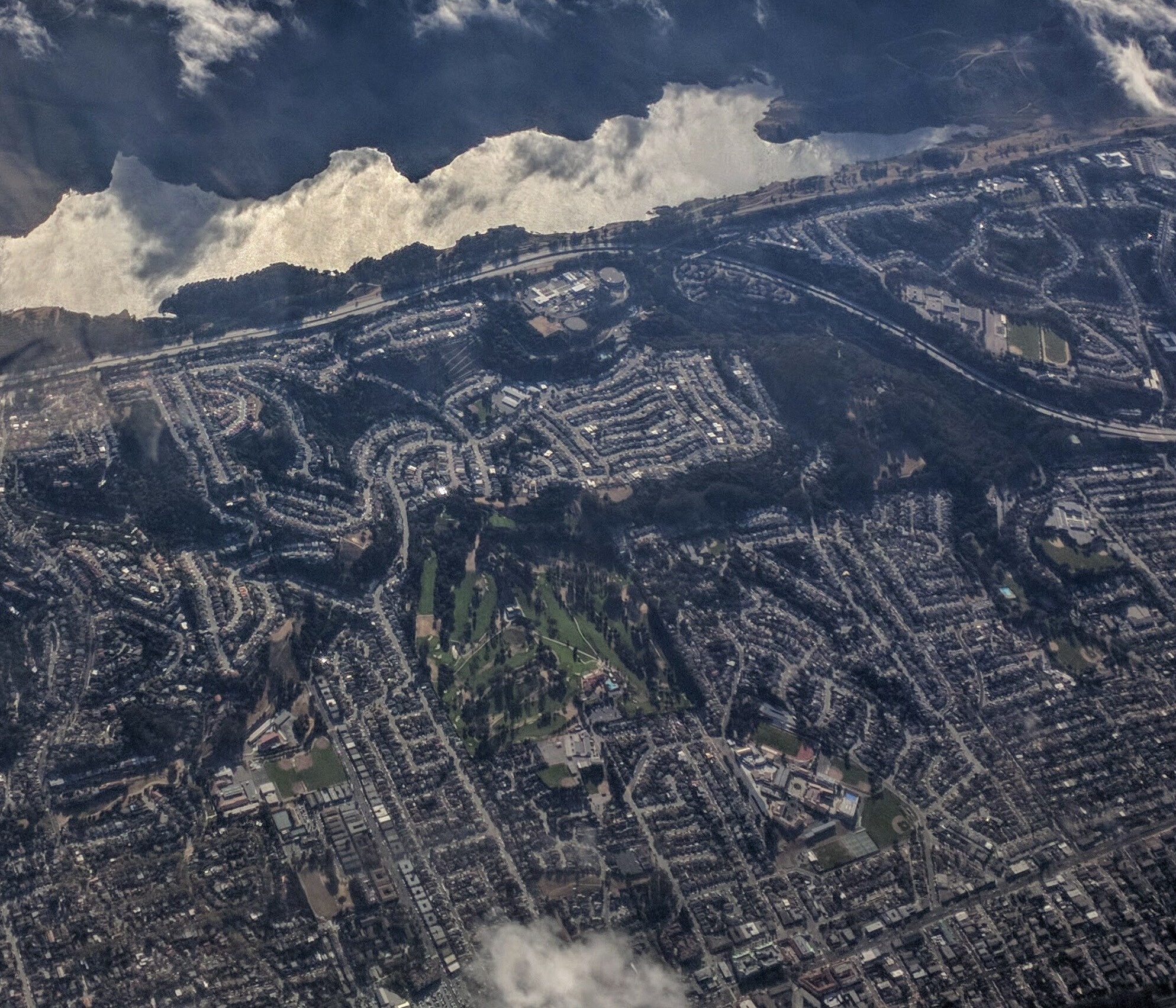
- Aerial view of Junipero Serra Park, visible as the forested area at center-right. I-280 is visible, running north-south across the top of the image, separating the park from San Andreas Lake to the west. San Bruno City Park is also visible as the green space extending east from the north end of Junipero Serra Park towards SR 82, a short portion of which runs across the bottom right corner.

- Location within San Francisco Bay Area Location within California
- Type: Parkland
- Location: 1801 Crystal Springs Road; San Bruno, California
- Coordinates: 37.609°N 122.426°W
- Area: 103 acres (42 ha)
- Created: May 22, 1960
- Operator: San Mateo County, California
- Open: All year
- Public transit: samTrans ECR, 41, 42, 142
- Website: www.smcgov.org/parks/junipero-serra-park

Junipero Serra County Park (sometimes shortened to Junipero Serra Park) is a 103-acre (42 ha) park in the hills overlooking San Bruno and Millbrae, California, east of Interstate 280 and west of State Route 82 (El Camino Real). It is administered by San Mateo County as part of its parks system, and was named for Junípero Serra, a priest responsible for establishing several of the Spanish missions in California.

== History ==
The site was used originally by Native Americans, as demonstrated by the presence of human remains and shell mounds; regular archaeological excavations are conducted there by Stanford University professor Patrick Hunt. By the early 19th century, it came under the control of Mission Dolores and the Presidio of San Francisco, then was granted to José de la Cruz Sánchez as part of Rancho Buri Buri in 1827. After Sánchez's death, the land was subdivided and a wagon trail was cut from San Bruno station to the San Andreas Valley, which later was paved and became Crystal Springs Road.

Residential growth in San Mateo County accelerated after the 1906 San Francisco earthquake, spurred by a City of San Bruno policy offering 1/4-acre (0.10 ha) lots with substantial tax benefits if a residence was built there within six months. The modern park site is the remnant of a ridge of sandstone, part of the Franciscan Complex; most of the ridge was removed for building materials by a quarry which operated until the mid-1950s.

The land for Junipero Serra Park was acquired by the county in 1956. The effort was led by San Mateo County Parks Director Ralph Shaw and the site, initially known as North County Park, was dedicated on May 22, 1960.

A Master Plan for the park was published in 1981; it identified four areas for development:

1. De Anza (family picnic area)
2. Willow/Oak Cove (small group, picnics, and occasional overnight camping)
3. Western Meadow View (family picnic area)
4. Meadow View and Crows Nest (group picnic area)

== Features ==
Park map

A branch of the San Andreas Fault, the Serra Fault, runs through the park. It is considered active. El Zanjon Creek, which flows into San Bruno Creek, runs along the north and west sides of the park.

The automobile entrance is in the northwest corner of the park, connecting to Crystal Springs Road. There are paved roads and parking lots within the park, providing automobile access to picnic areas and a youth camp. Additional pedestrian access is provided on the east (by City Park Trail, which connects to San Bruno City Park) and south (at the end of Helen Drive).

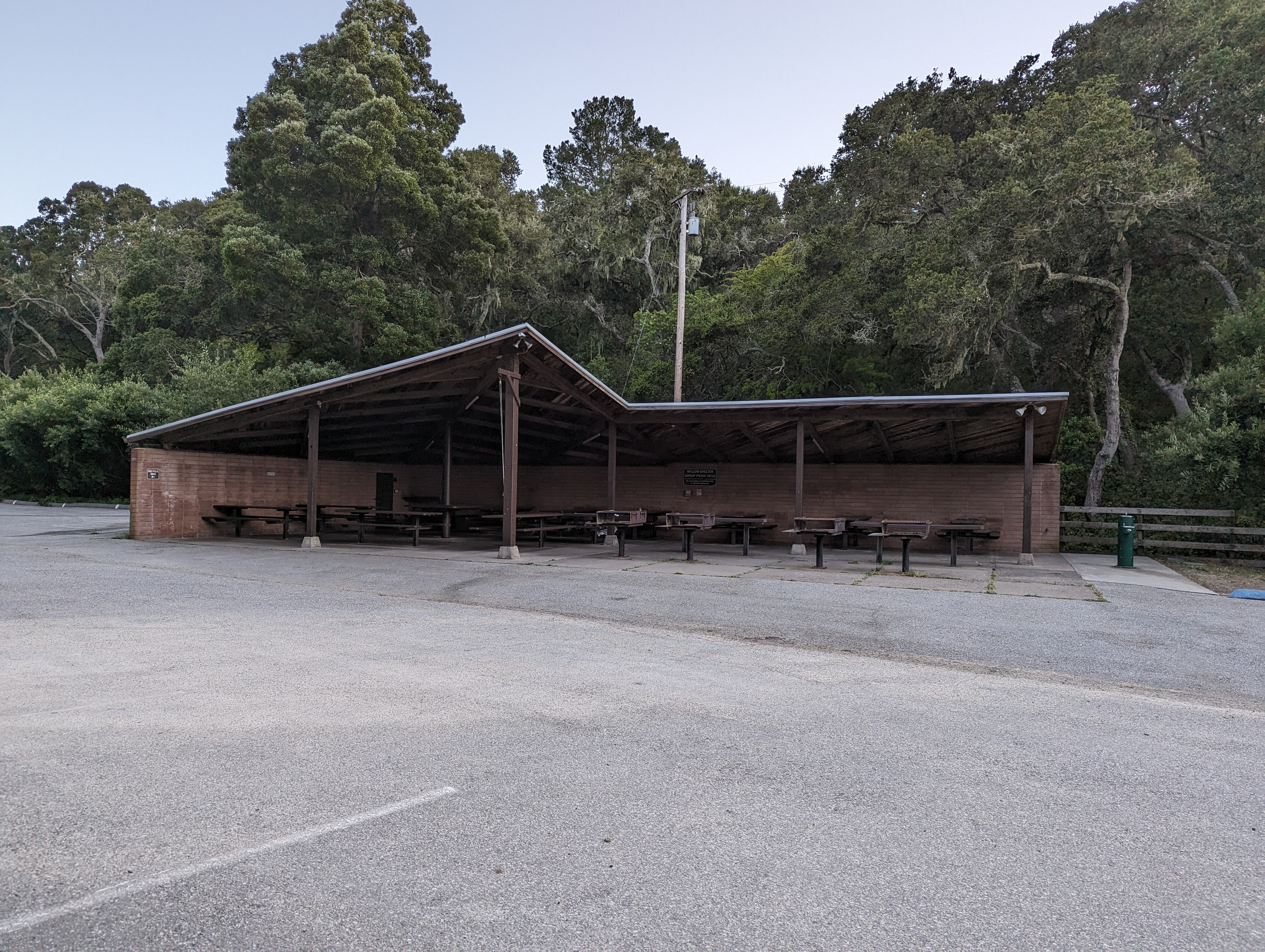
Willow Picnic Shelter on the west side of Junipero Serra Park

The De Anza area identified in the 1981 Master Plan now holds the automobile entrance and main parking lot, along with a picnic area and two trails (De Anza and Live Oak Nature loop). The Willow/Oak Cove area now has a covered picnic shelter, outdoor picnic areas, and a youth camp. A road leads to the Meadow View sites, which include parking, several picnic areas (one covered), and another youth camp. There are two playgrounds, one in Meadow View and the other in De Anza; the Meadow View playground features a large slide which was dedicated in April 2009.
