= Millbrae School District =

School district in California, United States

Address
- 555 Richmond Drive Millbrae, California, 94030; United States

District information
- Type: Public
- Grades: TK–8
- NCES District ID: 0624900

Students and staff
- Students: 2,075 (2022-23)
- Teachers: 86.13 (2022-23) (FTE)
- Staff: 66.00 (2022-23) (FTE)
- Student–teacher ratio: 25.09 (2022-23)

Other information
- Website: www.millbraeschooldistrict.org

The Millbrae Elementary School District is a TK-8 school district in Millbrae, California. It consists of one middle school (Taylor Middle School) and four elementary schools (Green Hills Elementary, Lomita Park Elementary, Meadows Elementary, and Spring Valley Elementary) listed here.

== See also ==
- List of school districts in San Mateo County, California
