= San Bruno Park School District =

School district in California, United States

Coordinates: 37°37.3′N 122°25′W

Address
- 500 Acacia Avenue San Bruno, California, 94066; United States

District information
- Type: Public
- Grades: K–8
- Established: 1906
- Superintendent: Matthew Duffy
- Asst. superintendent(s): Anjelica Zermeno
- NCES District ID: 0634230

Students and staff
- Students: 1950
- Teachers: 83.3
- Staff: 186.4
- Student–teacher ratio: 23.41

Other information
- Twitter: @SanBrunoParkSD
- Website: www.sbpsd.org

San Bruno Park School District is a TK–8 elementary school district with four elementary schools, one middle school, and one preschool in San Bruno, California.

== News articles about the District ==
Date	Article	Source
October 2, 2024	Without any parcel tax, San Bruno Park is asking for one	The San Mateo Daily Journal
April 26, 2025	Former teacher at two San Bruno elementary schools to serve 200 years for molesting students	The San Mateo Daily Journal
March 6, 2025	Lawsuits: San Bruno Park School District failed to prevent sexual abuse of student	The San Mateo Daily Journal
March 3, 2025	San Bruno school teacher convicted of molesting four students	The Mercury New
March 1, 2025	Former San Bruno teacher guilty of molesting students	The San Mateo Daily Journal
May 30, 2024	Parents of kids sickened by chemicals say officials kept ...	The San Francisco Chronicle
March 19, 2024	Incident between San Bruno middle school administrator, student	The San Mateo Daily Journal
January 25, 2024	Parents continue fight for San Bruno Park School District principal	The San Mateo Daily Journal
December 8, 2022	Many changes for San Bruno schools	The San Mateo Daily Journal

== Finding information ==
Local parents my find these links useful:

- School Board Meeting agendas and minutes (on BoardDocs)
- School Board Policy Manual (on BoardDocs)
- Parent Handbook
- LCAP (Local Control and Accountability Plan) - Describes how the District will use its resources to improve student outcomes based on state and local priorities. Includes interesting information about the number of students per school, and number and percentage of special education students per school.
- San Bruno Education Foundation (SBEF)
- Champions (before and after care program) - For the 2025-2026 school year, the District has a school-board approved contract with Champions that is "not to exceed $540,170." For more information, see the June 18, 2025 school board meeting agenda, under "Education Services Contracts."

== School Board ==
- List of current school board trustees
- School board trustee map (for elections)

== Superintendents ==
- Eugene Knight, July 1921 – June 1922
- Henry C. Hall, September 1922 – May 1944
- Willard R. Engvall, June 1944 – June 1959
- George Lawry, July 1959 – June 1971
- William Jennings, July 1971 – November 1978
- Dr. Robert Rottman, January 1979 – June 1980
- Dr. John Mehl, July 1980 – August 1991
- Dr. Theresa Daem, October 1991 – June 1998
- Dr. Donna Elder, August 1998 – July 2002
- Dr. David E. Hutt, November 2002 – June 2015
- Cheryl Olson, July 2015 – 2017
- Dr. Stella M. Kemp, Ed.D., August 2017 – ?
- Dr. Jose Espinoza, Ed.D., July 2020 – Jan 2022
- Matthew Duffy, 2022 to present

== Special Education Directors ==
The District has had high turnover in the role of Director of Special Education for several years.

1. Ellen L. Merritt, ? – July 2016
2. Leigh Schwartz, July 2016 – July 2017: Director of Special Education and Student Services
3. Sarah Notch, June 2018 – June 2019: Director of Special Education and Student Services
4. Anita Allardice, July 2019 – July 2021: Director of Special Education and Student Services
5. Dr. Kristin Vogel Campbell, Ed.D., June 2021 – June 2022: Director of Special Education and Student Services
6. David Paliughi, July 2022 – June 2025: Director of Special Education
7. Dr. Sukanya Goswami, Ed.D., June 2025 to present: Director of Special Education

== Participating district in San Mateo SELPA ==
San Bruno Park School District is a participating district in the San Mateo County SELPA (Special Education Local Plan Area). Therefore, local parents (and especially local special education parents) may find these links useful:

- About San Mateo SELPA: Includes information about San Mateo SELPA Governing Board Meetings.
- About San Mateo SELPA CAC: Includes information about San Mateo SELPA CAC (Community Advisory Committee) Meetings.
- San Mateo SELPA CAC Bylaws
- California Special Education Local Plan Area Community Advisory Committee (CAC) Guide, 5th Edition, 2022
- San Mateo SELPA Governing Board Meeting agendas and minutes (on BoardDocs)
- San Mateo SELPA CAC Meeting agendas and minutes (on BoardDocs)
- San Mateo SELPA Policy Manual

== School district legal counsel ==
The District uses Fagen Friedman & Fulfrost (F3 Law) as legal counsel. The attorney retainer agreement is attached to the August 13, 2025 school board meeting agenda, under "Business Office Contracts."

== Schools ==
Preschools

- San Bruno Preschool

Elementary Schools (grades TK - 5)

- Belle Air Elementary School (opened 1951)
- Decima Allen Elementary School (opened 1941, expanded 1946 and 1956, rebuilt 2023)
- John Muir Elementary School (opened 1960)
- Portola Elementary School (opened 1964)

Middle Schools (grades 6-8)

- Parkside Intermediate School (opened 1954)

== Closed schools ==
- Crestmoor Elementary School (opened 1957, closed 2013)
- El Crystal Elementary School (opened 1948; expanded 1956, closed 2018)
- Rollingwood Elementary School (opened 1956, closed 2023)

== Parcel Tax ==
In November 2024, voters approved a parcel tax to help better fund the District. For more information, see the Parcel Tax Updates page on the District's website.

== History ==
The San Bruno Park School District was created in 1906 in San Bruno, to meet the needs of a growing population following the San Francisco earthquake and fire.

The first public school in San Bruno, California, known as the "Old Tin School House," was built on El Camino Real with volunteer labor. The first school year, 1906–07, had an enrollment of 44 students. A bond election in 1907 raised $1,000 for the district.

The second, Edgemont Elementary School, was built on a large lot bounded by Elm, Acacia, and Jenevein avenues. The building also housed the district offices. With the completion of this building in November 1910, the "Old Tin School House" served as a municipal building, known as Green Hall. It eventually became San Bruno's first city hall in 1914, when the city was incorporated.

An additional elementary school, North Brae Elementary School, was opened in 1912. An annex was added to Edgemont Elementary School in the early 1930s to accommodate the rapidly growing school population in San Bruno.

With the passage of the Field Act by the California legislature following the devastating 1933 Long Beach earthquake, steps were taken to seismically upgrade existing schools or close them. However, the upgrading or closing of California's public schools took many years, since the State of California left funding to the districts.

San Bruno's population increased to 3,610 in 1930 and exceeded 6,000 in 1940, encouraging the district to build another school. In 1941, the New Edgemont Elementary School was built a block west of the district's offices, at 875 W. Angus Avenue. Additional classrooms were added in 1946. New offices, a cafeteria (with a stage), and a kindergarten building (now the media center) were built in 1956.

With the postwar building boom, more schools were built in San Bruno. The district's third school, El Crystal, was built on a small hill overlooking San Bruno City Park in 1948. It had additional classrooms added during the 1956–57 school year when some students attending New Edgemont were bused to the school to relieve overcrowding at New Edgemont.

Belle Air Elementary School was opened in 1951 in the lowlands of San Bruno, near Mills Field (renamed San Francisco International Airport in 1954).

The district's first intermediate school, housing San Bruno's seventh and eighth grade students, was Parkside, which opened in 1954 on Niles Avenue. This school was expanded over the years. In 1973 gymnasiums, lockers, and showers were added at Parkside.

With the development of the massive Rollingwood and Crestmoor subdivisions in western San Bruno in the 1950s, the district built additional elementary schools. The first of these, Rollingwood Elementary School, opened in 1956. Next came two schools in the Crestmoor district, both on Crestmoor Drive: Crestmoor Elementary School in 1957, followed by John Muir Elementary School in 1960 (named for the famous naturalist who lived for many years in Martinez, California).

In late 1957, following damage to Edgemont Elementary School by the 1957 San Francisco earthquake on March 22, the school board decided to close the building, demolish it, and replace it with new classrooms and offices. With the completion of the new facility, New Edgemont Elementary School was renamed Decima Allen Elementary School, to honor a beloved librarian. Decima M. Allen was San Bruno's librarian from 1937 to 1955, overseeing the construction of the present main library next to the city hall in 1954; she also served on the school board for 25 years and was president of the Edgemont PTA.

The district's final elementary school was Carl Sandburg Elementary School (named after Carl Sandburg), built in the Rollingwood district. At the official dedication of the school in December 1961, the famous poet and historian came for the ceremonies. As a San Bruno Herald reporter observed, Sandburg looked around at the school's children, smiled, and audibly marvelled at their young faces.

The school district also built another intermediate school, in Crestmoor Canyon, to honor former school superintendent Willard Engvall (1898–1983). This school opened in 1962. Gymnasiums were added to both intermediate schools in 1973.

Falling school enrollments in San Bruno in the 1970s and 1980s forced the school district to begin closing some of the schools. Eventually, North Brae Elementary School, Carl Sandburg Elementary School, and Engvall Intermediate School were closed. The buildings were later demolished and the land was sold to developers.

In March 1996, the voters of San Bruno approved a $600,000 bond for seismic improvements to the schools. There was an education summit for all members of the community in March 1998. Then, in April 1998, the voters approved a $30 million bond for the renovation and modernization of the schools. During the 1999–2000 school year, the district began offering child care at each school. A state preschool program was begun at Belle Air in 2000.

The Portola Elementary School, located in the city's northwestern corner, had long been part of the Laguna Salada School District, headquartered in Pacifica, California. Built in 1964, the school became part of the San Bruno Park Elementary School District in July 2000. In 2013, it was decided that Crestmoor Elementary School would be closed due to low attendance. In 2018, it was decided that El Crystal and Rollingwood would close, due to financial difficulties being experienced by the district.
