= Mills-Peninsula Medical Center =

Teaching hospital in Burlingame, California

- Sutter Health

Geography
- Location: 1501 Trousdale Dr, Burlingame, CA, United States
- Coordinates: 37.59178°N 122.38356°W

Organization
- Type: Teaching hospital

Services
- Beds: 241

Helipads
- Helipad: Yes

History
- Former names: Peninsula Hospital and Medical Center

Links
- Website: https://www.sutterhealth.org/mills
- Lists: Hospitals in the United States

Sutter Health Mills-Peninsula Medical Center (MPMC) is a 241-bed, not-for-profit general medical and surgical located in Burlingame, California. In addition to emergency and ICU services, MPMC offers both inpatient and outpatient services at its 450,000 square foot campus.

== History ==
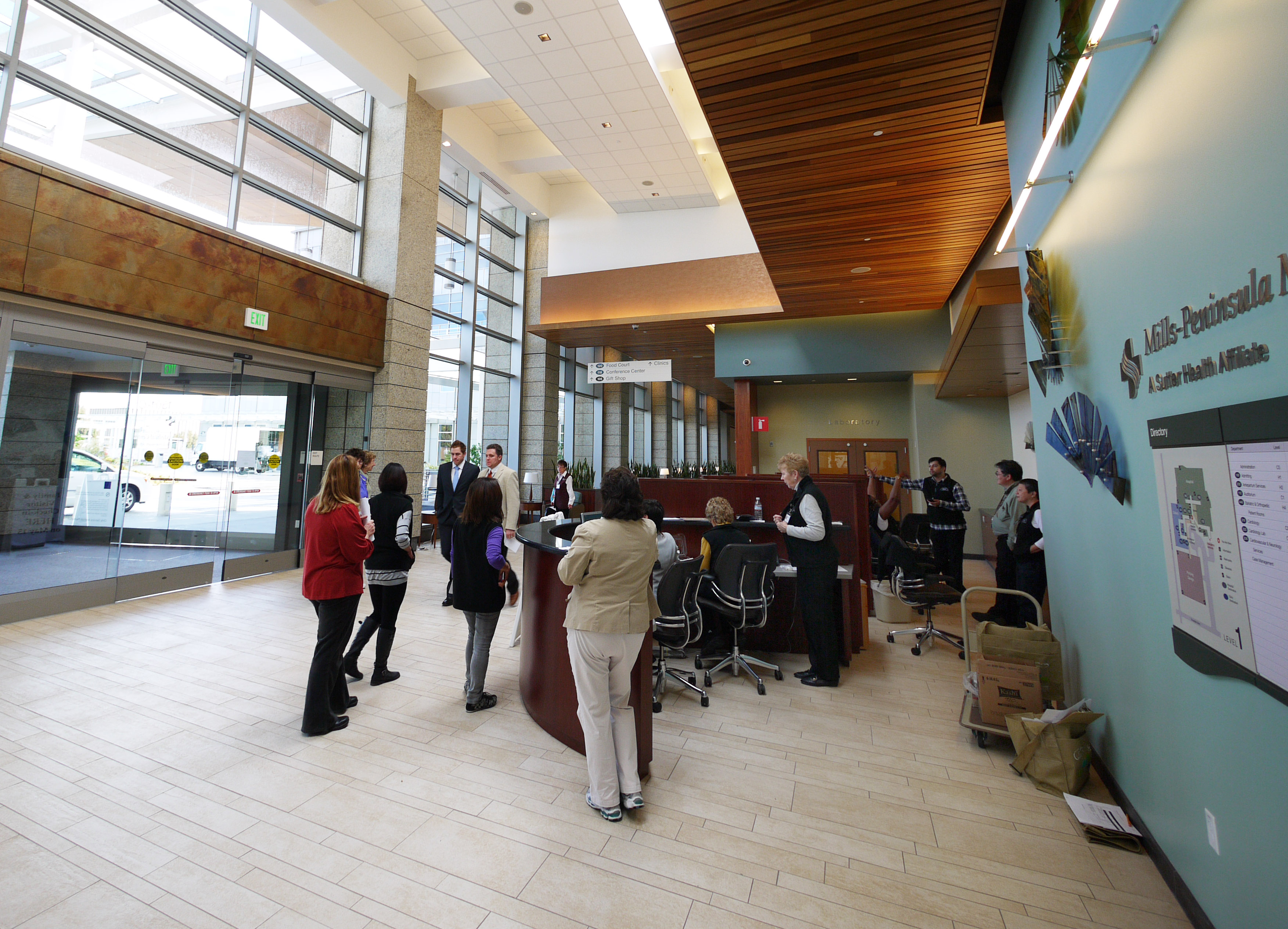
Mills-Peninsula Medical Center interior

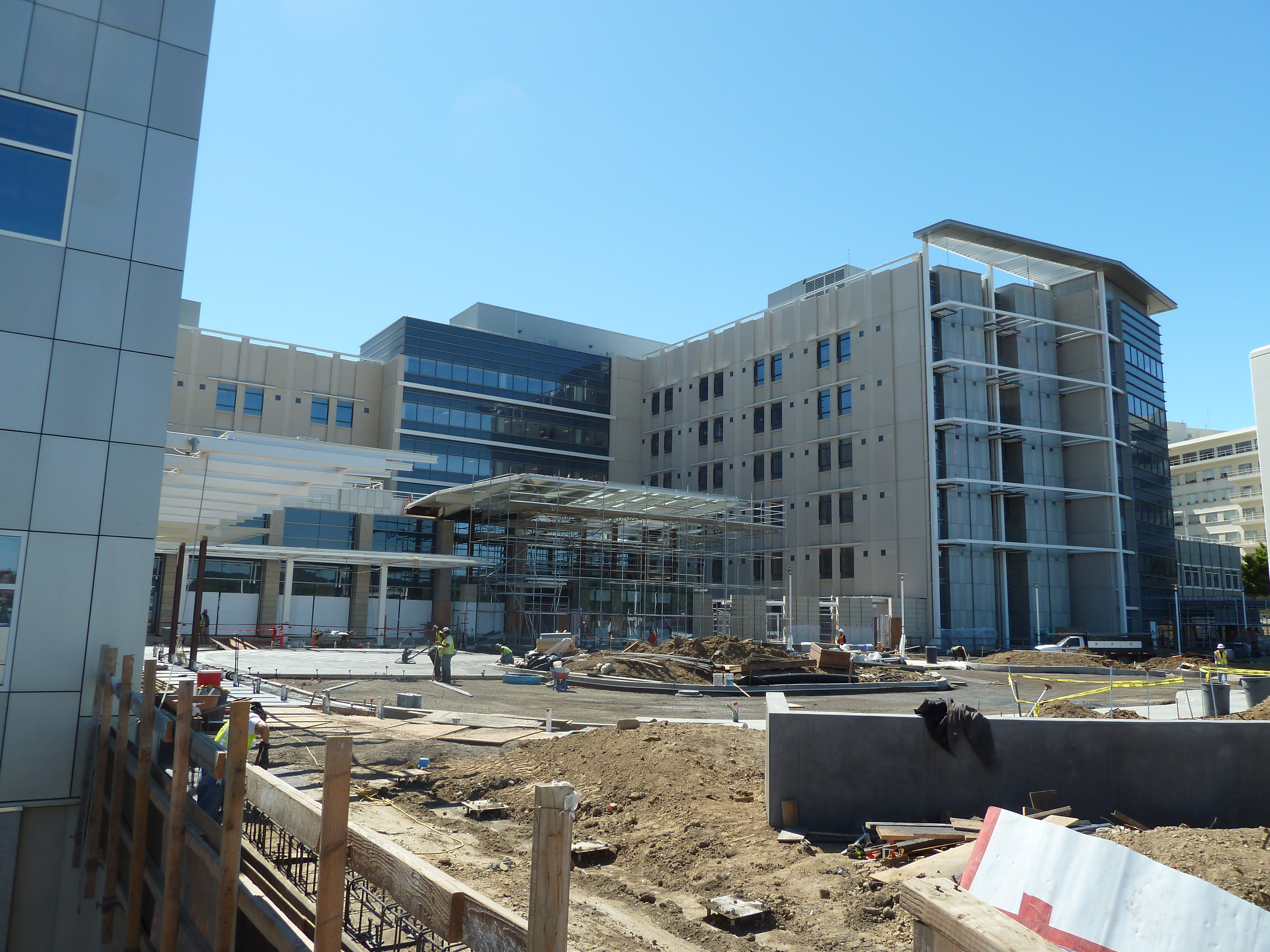
Mills-Peninsula Medical Center exterior, under construction

Originally founded in 1954 as Peninsula Hospital, it merged with Mills Memorial Hospital in 1985 and became Mills-Peninsula Hospitals. In 1986, Mills-Peninsula was a founding member of the California Healthcare System (CHS), along with local medical centers California Pacific, Alta Bates Summit, and Marin General. Ten years later, in 1996, CHS merged with Sutter Health. The same year, the Burlingame hospital became Mills-Peninsula Medical Center and absorbed all inpatient care; the Mills hospital campus in San Mateo, originally founded in 1907, became Mills Health Center and transitioned to an outpatient clinic. In 2011, the original Peninsula Hospital building was demolished after a new hospital was constructed to meet California's seismic requirements.
