= 2022 San Mateo County elections =

- November 8, 2022
- Registered: 432,707
- Turnout: 58.29% (▼27.6 pp)

The 2022 San Mateo County elections were held on November 8, 2022, in San Mateo County, California, with nonpartisan blanket primary elections for certain offices being held on June 7. Two of the five seats of the Board of Supervisors were up for election, as well as all seven of the countywide elected officials, the Assessor-County Clerk-Recorder, the County Controller, the Coroner, the District Attorney, the Sheriff, the County Superintendent of Schools, and the Treasurer-Tax Collector.

Municipal elections in California are officially nonpartisan; candidates' party affiliations do not appear on the ballot.

== Board of Supervisors District 2 ==
2022 San Mateo County Board of Supervisors election District 2
- Registered: 86,898
- Turnout: 61.23%
Candidate	Noelia Corzo	Charles Stone	Cameron Rolfe
First round	12,635; 43.00%	13,470; 45.84%	3,282; 11.17%
Runoff	22,246; 51.74%	20,747; 48.26%	Eliminated
Supervisor before election
Carole Groom
Supervisor after election
Noelia Corzo

Incumbent District 2 Supervisor Carole Groom was term limited and unable to run for reelection. San Mateo-Foster City School District Trustee Noelia Corzo beat Belmont City Councilmember Charles Stone in a runoff.

=== Candidates ===
==== Advanced to runoff ====
- Noelia Corzo, San Mateo-Foster City School District trustee
- Charles Stone, Belmont city councilmember

==== Eliminated in primary ====
- Cameron Rolfe

==== Declined ====
- Chelsea Bonini, San Mateo County Board of Education trustee
- Diane Papan, San Mateo city councilmember (ran for state assembly)
- Shara Watkins, San Mateo-Foster City School District trustee

=== Results ===
2022 Supervisorial District 2 Election
Primary election
Candidate	Votes	%
Charles Stone	13,470	45.84
Noelia Corzo	12,635	43.00
Cameron Rolfe	3,282	11.17
Total votes	35,195	100.00
Turnout	{{{votes}}}	40.36%
General election
Noelia Corzo	22,246	51.74
Charles Stone	20,747	48.26
Total votes	53,211	100.00
Turnout	{{{votes}}}	61.23%

== Board of Supervisors District 3 ==
2022 San Mateo County Board of Supervisors election District 3
- Registered: 104,024
- Turnout: 67.79%
Candidate	Ray Mueller	Laura Parmer-Lohan	Virginia Chang Kiraly
First round	13,888; 34.45%	12,778; 31.70%	7,986; 19.81%
Runoff	35,887; 62.22%	21,790; 37.78%	Eliminated
Candidate	Steven Booker
First round	5,659; 14.04%
Runoff	Eliminated
Supervisor before election
Don Horsley
Supervisor after election
Ray Mueller

Incumbent District 2 Supervisor Don Horsley was term limited and unable to run for reelection. Menlo Park City Councilmember Ray Mueller beat San Carlos City Councilmember Laura Parmer-Lohan to replace Horsley.

=== Candidates ===
==== Advanced to runoff ====
- Ray Mueller, Menlo Park city councilmember
- Laura Parmer-Lohan, San Carlos city councilmember

==== Eliminated in primary ====
- Steven Booker, labor union representative
- Virginia Chang Kiraly, boards member of the Menlo Park Fire Protection District and San Mateo County Harbor District

==== Declined ====
- Mike O’Neill, Pacifica city councilmember

=== Results ===
2022 Supervisorial District 3 Election
Primary election
Candidate	Votes	%
Ray Mueller	13,888	34.45
Laura Parmer-Lohan	12,778	31.70
Virginia Chang Kiraly	7,986	19.81
Steven Booker	5,659	14.04
Total votes	47,048	100.00
Turnout	{{{votes}}}	45.11%
General election
Ray Mueller	35,887	62.22
Laura Parmer-Lohan	21,790	37.78
Total votes	70,514	100.00
Turnout	{{{votes}}}	67.79%

== Assessor-County Clerk-Recorder ==
2022 San Mateo County Assessor-County Clerk-Recorder election
- Registered: 433,539
- Turnout: 38.38%
Candidate	Mark Church	David Pollack
Results	116,684; 82.78%	24,275; 17.22%
Assessor-County Clerk-Recorder before election
Mark Church
Assessor-County Clerk-Recorder after election
Mark Church

Incumbent Assessor-County Clerk-Recorder Mark Church defeated David Pollack to win reelection. Church was first elected in 2010 and reelected in 2018.

=== Candidates ===
==== Declared ====
- Mark Church, incumbent assessor-county clerk-recorder
- David Pollack

=== Results ===
2022 Assessor-County Clerk-Recorder Election
Primary election
Candidate	Votes	%
Mark Church (incumbent)	116,684	82.78
David Pollack	24,275	17.22
Total votes	166,391	100.00
Turnout	{{{votes}}}	38.38%

== County Controller ==
2022 San Mateo County Controller election
- Registered: 433,539
- Turnout: 38.38%
Candidate	Juan Raigoza
Results	116,406; 100.00%
County Controller before election
Juan Raigoza
County Controller after election
Juan Raigoza

Incumbent County Controller Juan Raigoza, first elected in 2014, ran unopposed for reelection.

=== Candidates ===
==== Declared ====
- Juan Raigoza, incumbent county controller

=== Results ===
2022 County Controller Election
Primary election
Candidate	Votes	%
Juan Raigoza (incumbent)	116,406	100.00
Total votes	166,391	100.00
Turnout	{{{votes}}}	38.38%

== Coroner ==
2022 San Mateo County Coroner election
- Registered: 433,539
- Turnout: 38.38%
Candidate	Robert Foucrault	Mark De Paula (write-in)
Results	119,014; 99.96%	49; 0.04%
Coroner before election
Robert Foucrault
Coroner after election
Robert Foucrault

Incumbent Coroner Robert Foucrault, who first assumed office in 2001 after the death of Coroner Adrian "Bud" Moorman died, defeated write-in candidate Mark De Paula to win reelection.

=== Candidates ===
==== Declared ====
- Robert Foucrault, incumbent coroner
- Mark De Paula, write-in

=== Results ===
2022 Coroner Election
Primary election
Candidate	Votes	%
Robert Foucrault (incumbent)	119,014	99.96
Mark De Paula (write-in)	49	0.04
Total votes	166,391	100.00
Turnout	{{{votes}}}	38.38%

== District Attorney ==
2022 San Mateo County District Attorney election
- Registered: 433,539
- Turnout: 38.38%
Candidate	Stephen Wagstaffe
Results	118,491; 100.00%
District Attorney before election
Stephen Wagstaffe
District Attorney after election
Stephen Wagstaffe

Incumbent District Attorney Steve Wagstaffe, first elected in 2010, ran unopposed for reelection.

=== Candidates ===
==== Declared ====
- Steve Wagstaffe, incumbent district attorney

=== Results ===
2022 District Attorney Election
Primary election
Candidate	Votes	%
Steve Wagstaffe (incumbent)	118,491	100.00
Total votes	166,391	100.00
Turnout	{{{votes}}}	38.38%

== Sheriff ==
2022 San Mateo County Sheriff election
- Registered: 433,539
- Turnout: 38.38%
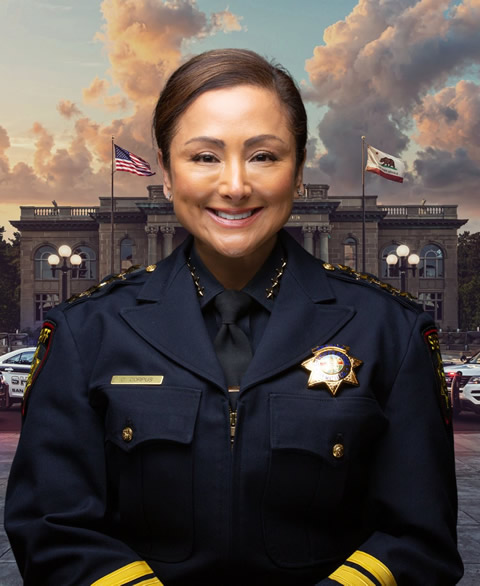

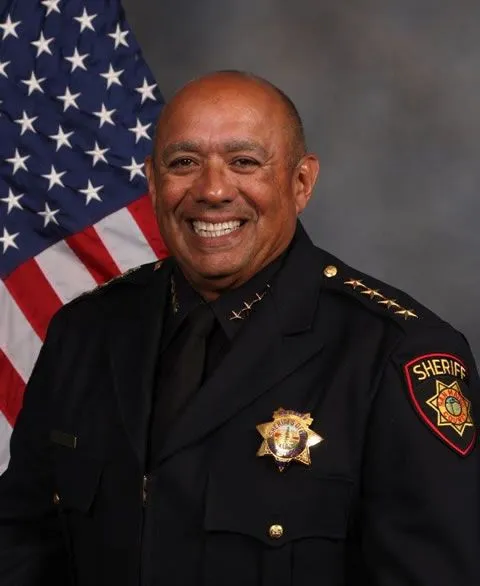
Candidate	Christina Corpus	Carlos Bolanos	Heinz Puschendorf (write-in)
Results	82,622; 56.86%	62,626; 43.10%	62; 0.04%
Sheriff before election
Carlos Bolanos
Sheriff after election
Christina Corpus

Incumbent Sheriff Carlos Bolanos, who first assumed office in 2016 after the resignation of Sheriff Greg Munks, lost to sheriff's captain and Millbrae chief of police Christina Corpus.

=== Candidates ===
==== Declared ====
- Carlos Bolanos, incumbent sheriff
- Christina Corpus, sheriff's captain and Millbrae chief of police
- Heinz Puschendorf, write-in

=== Results ===
2022 Sheriff Election
Primary election
Candidate	Votes	%
Christina Corpus	82,622	56.86
Carlos Bolanos (incumbent)	62,626	43.10
Heinz Puschendorf (write-in)	62	0.04
Total votes	166,391	100.00
Turnout	{{{votes}}}	38.38%

== County Superintendent of Schools ==
2022 San Mateo County County Superintendent of Schools election
- Registered: 433,539
- Turnout: 38.38%
Candidate	Nancy Magee
Results	114,484; 100.00%
County Superintendent of Schools before election
Nancy Magee
County Superintendent of Schools after election
Nancy Magee

Incumbent County Superintendent of Schools Nancy Magee, first elected in 2018, ran unopposed for reelection.

=== Candidates ===
==== Declared ====
- Nancy Magee, incumbent county superintendent of schools

=== Results ===
2022 County Superintendent of Schools Election
Primary election
Candidate	Votes	%
Nancy Magee (incumbent)	114,484	100.00
Total votes	166,391	100.00
Turnout	{{{votes}}}	38.38%

== Treasurer-Tax Collector ==
2022 San Mateo County Treasurer-Tax Collector election
- Registered: 433,539
- Turnout: 38.38%
Candidate	Sandie Arnott
Results	123,306; 100.00%
Treasurer-Tax Collector before election
Sandie Arnott
Treasurer-Tax Collector after election
Sandie Arnott

Incumbent Treasurer-Tax Collector Sandie Arnott, first elected in 2010, ran unopposed for reelection.

=== Candidates ===
==== Declared ====
- Sandie Arnott, incumbent treasurer-tax collector

=== Results ===
2022 Treasurer-Tax Collector Election
Primary election
Candidate	Votes	%
Sandie Arnott (incumbent)	123,306	100.00
Total votes	166,391	100.00
Turnout	{{{votes}}}	38.38%

== See also ==
- San Mateo County, California
- San Mateo County Board of Supervisors
- 2022 California elections
