= 2024 San Mateo County elections =

- November 5, 2024
- Registered: 432,707

The 2024 San Mateo County elections were held on November 5, 2024, in San Mateo County, California, with nonpartisan blanket primary elections for certain offices being held on March 5. Three of the five seats of the Board of Supervisors are up for election.

Municipal elections in California are officially nonpartisan; candidates' party affiliations do not appear on the ballot.

== Board of Supervisors District 1 ==
2024 San Mateo County Board of Supervisors election District 1
- Registered: 86,626
- Turnout: 37.87%
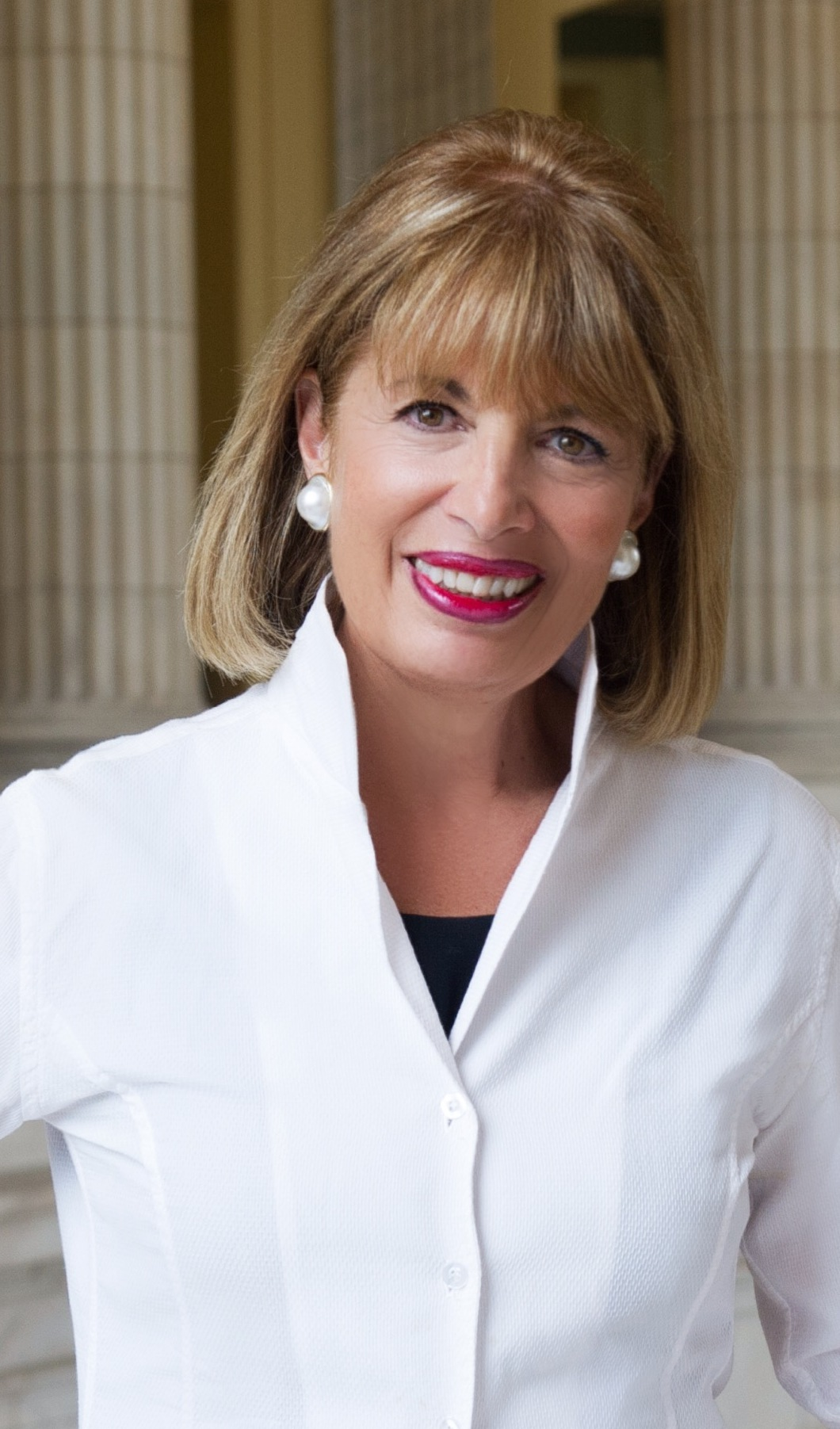
| Candidate | Jackie Speier | Ann Schneider |
| Popular vote | 20,353 | 9,297 |
| Percentage | 68.64% | 31.36% |
Supervisor before election
Dave Pine
Supervisor after election
Jackie Speier

The incumbent is Dave Pine, who has represented the district since 2011 and was re-elected in 2020. He is term limited in 2024.

=== Candidates ===
==== Declared ====
- Ann Schneider, Millbrae city councilor
- Jackie Speier, former U.S. Representative from California's 14th congressional district (2008-2023) and former San Mateo County supervisor (1980-1986)

==== Withdrew ====
- Emily Beach, Burlingame city councilor and candidate for California's 14th congressional district in 2022 (endorsed Jackie Speier)
- Gina Papan, Millbrae city councilor (endorsed Jackie Speier)
- Jorge Quezada Flores

==== Declined ====
- James H. Coleman, South San Francisco city councilor
- Anders Fung, Millbrae city councilor
- Maurice Goodman, Millbrae city councilor
- Rico Medina, San Bruno mayor
- Ricardo Ortiz, Burlingame city councilor
- Irving Torres, housing advocate

== Board of Supervisors District 4 ==
2024 San Mateo County Board of Supervisors election District 4
- Registered: 76,179
- Turnout: 36.83%
| Candidate | Lisa Gauthier | Antonio Lopez | Maggie Cornejo |
| First round | 10,358; 45.58% | 5,730; 25.21% | 3,460; 15.23% |
| Runoff | 26,428; 56.70% | 20,184; 43.30% |
| Candidate | Paul Bocanegra | Celeste Brevard |
| First round | 1,909; 8.40% | 1,268; 5.58% |
Supervisor before election
Warren Slocum
Supervisor after election
Lisa Gauthier

The incumbent is Warren Slocum, who has represented the district since 2013 and was re-elected in 2020. He is term limited in 2024.

=== Candidates ===
==== Advanced to runoff ====
- Lisa Gauthier, East Palo Alto city councilor
- Antonio Lopez, East Palo Alto city councilor

==== Eliminated in primary ====
- Paul Bocanegra, juvenile justice advocate
- Celeste Brevard, project manager
- Maggie Cornejo, former county legislative aide

==== Declined ====
- Alicia Aguirre, Redwood City city councilor
- Ian Bain, former Redwood City city councilor
- Drew Combs, Menlo Park city councilor
- Giselle Hale, former Redwood City city councilor
- Cecilia Taylor, Menlo Park city councilor

== Board of Supervisors District 5 ==
2024 San Mateo County Board of Supervisors District 5 election
- Registered: 81,208
- Turnout: 31.30%
| Candidate | David Canepa |
| Popular vote | 19,937 |
| Percentage | 100% |
Supervisor before election
David Canepa
Supervisor after election
David Canepa

The incumbent is David Canepa, who has represented the district since 2017 and was re-elected in 2020.

=== Candidates ===
==== Declared ====
- David Canepa, incumbent supervisor

== See also ==
- San Mateo County, California
- San Mateo County Board of Supervisors
- 2022 San Mateo County elections
- 2022 California elections
