= Carlos Bolanos =

Former Sheriff of San Mateo County, California

Sheriff of San Mateo County, California
- In office July 17, 2016 – January 2023
- Preceded by: Greg Munks
- Succeeded by: Christina Corpus

Personal details
- Born: 1958 or 1959 (age 66–67)

Carlos Bolanos (born 1958 or 1959) was the 25th sheriff of San Mateo County, California, serving from 2016 to 2023.

== Early life and career ==
Bolanos was captain in the Salinas Police Department for three years. As of 1991, Bolanos was a Lieutenant in the Palo Alto Police Department. In 1994 at the age of 34, he became police chief of Redwood City. In 1997, Police Chief Bolanos instituted a policy that officers write 16 traffic tickets and arrest seven people every month. The practice was opposed by the Redwood City Police Officers Association and informally endorsed by the Redwood City Council.

Sheriff Greg Munks appointed Bolanos to be Undersheriff of San Mateo County in 2007.

In April 2007, Bolanos and Sheriff Greg Munks were found at a suspected illegal brothel in Las Vegas by the local police. Munks released a statement apologizing and emphasized that he and Bolanos had done nothing wrong.

== Sheriff of San Mateo County ==
On July 1, 2016, Sheriff Greg Munks announced that he would step down on July 16 for health reasons. On July 12, 2016, the San Mateo County Board of Supervisors voted 3–2 to appoint Undersheriff Carlos Bolanos to serve the remainder of the term. Congressional representatives Anna Eshoo and Jackie Speier submitted a letter advocating for a more open process to consider other candidates for sheriff.

Bolanos won election in 2018 against challenger Mark Melville.

Bolanos was defeated in the June 2022 election by Christina Corpus. Bolanos announced plans to retire after he left office in January 2023.

=== Batmobile arrest ===
In July 2022, KGO-TV ABC 7 news reported that Bolanos sent four staff members to Indiana to investigate the only licensed maker of replica Batmobile vehicles. An associate and donor to Bolanos, Sam Anagnostou, was in a dispute with the car maker over a car sale, and had contacted Bolanos. Bolanos's office charged the owner of the company, Mark Racop, with two felonies and froze two of his bank accounts.

The San Mateo County Board of Supervisors launched a probe to answer allegations that Bolanos directed the raid inappropriately as a favor to Anagnostou. The board also asked the California Attorney General to investigate; the Attorney General declined, stating that the California Department of Justice only steps in "when there is a compelling need".

In September 2022, the San Mateo County District Attorney's office dismissed the charges against Racop.

=== Alleged favoritism in concealed carry permits ===
In December 2022, KGO-TV ABC 7 news reported a disparity in concealed carry weapons (CCW) permits awarded by the Sheriff's office based on whether the applicant donated to Bolanos's election campaign. From 2018 to 2021, 65 out of 295 (22%) of non-donors were granted permits, but 14 out of 16 (88%) of donors were granted permits. State-required firearms training also had evidence of differential treatment. The investigation found that at least 39 people did not complete the public firearms training course, and most received special accommodations or private sessions, including billionaires Larry Ellison, Thomas Siebel, and Riley P. Bechtel. Sources alleged that donors were held to lower standards than non-donors. The investigation also found that at least five donors with CCW did not have any documentation that they completed weapons training.

First-Time Concealed Carry Weapons Permits Granted, 2018–2021
	Total applicants	Approved Applicants	Percent Approved
Non-Donors	295	65	22%
Donors	16	14	88%

=== Alleged favoritism in promotions ===
In December 2022, KGO-TV ABC7 News reported that staff in the Sheriff's Office were pressured to donate to Bolanos's campaign in order to be promoted. In an analysis of recent promotions, the news team found that more than half of recently promoted staff had donated to Bolanos's campaign. In other Bay Area counties like Alameda, Marin, and Napa, that number was far lower.

Promotions January 2021-February 2022
County	Total Promotions	Promotions who Donated to Sheriff Campaign	Percentage
Alameda	50	0	0%
Marin	7	1	13%
Napa	16	3	19%
San Mateo	22	14	64%
