= Christina Corpus =

Sheriff of San Mateo County 2023–2025

Sheriff of San Mateo County, California
- In office January 3, 2023 – October 14, 2025
- Preceded by: Carlos Bolanos
- Succeeded by: Ken Binder

Personal details
- Born: 1970 or 1971 (age 55–56)
- Education: Master of Law Enforcement and Public Safety Leadership, University of San Diego 2021; Bachelor of Law Enforcement, Union Institute and University College of San Mateo; City College of San Francisco

Christina Corpus (born 1970 or 1971) is an American former law enforcement officer who served as the 26th sheriff of San Mateo County, California from January 3, 2023, to October 14, 2025. She was the first woman and first Latina elected sheriff in the county, and the first sheriff to be removed by a County Board of Supervisors in California history.

Born in Daly City, California, Corpus joined the San Mateo County Sheriff's Office in 2002 and rose through the ranks to become captain of Millbrae. She challenged incumbent Carlos Bolanos, promising limited cooperation with federal immigration authorities and more transparency in the Sheriff's office. She won with 57% of the vote and became Sheriff in 2023.

During Corpus's tenure, the Sheriff's Office investigated and made arrests for the 2023 Half Moon Bay shootings.

In 2024, Corpus faced no-confidence votes and calls to resign from the deputy sheriffs' union and the San Mateo County Board of Supervisors over the conduct and relationship with her Chief of Staff, Victor Aenlle. The San Mateo County Board of Supervisors' report claimed that Corpus had a close personal relationship with Aenlle and violated the county's conflict of interest policies. Corpus denied all claims. The San Mateo County Board of Supervisors went to the ballot to seek the authority to remove Corpus from office. That measure passed with 84% support. After following the removal process, the San Mateo County Board of Supervisors removed Corpus from office on October 14, 2025.

== Early life and career ==
Corpus was born in Daly City, California in 1970 or 1971 to immigrant parents from Nicaragua and Mexico. She was raised by a single mother. As a teenager, she survived an attempted carjacking and kidnapping outside Tanforan Mall, an event she later described as motivating her to enter law enforcement.

She began her career in 1995 at the San Mateo County District Attorney’s Office, working as a receptionist and later as a caseworker in the Department of Child Support Services.

In 2002, Corpus joined the San Mateo County Sheriff’s Office. At 5 ft 2 in (160 cm), she was one of two women selected from 150 applicants for correctional officer positions. Over the following two decades, she served in the women’s jail, on patrol in North Fair Oaks, and later as bureau commander and captain overseeing the Bayside Patrol Bureau, the Operations Division, and the K-9 unit. She also launched several community programs, including a Women in Law Enforcement Boot Camp, a youth running club, and a community feedback initiative on police performance.

By 2021, Corpus was serving as captain in charge of Millbrae police services. That same year, she earned a master’s degree in law enforcement and public safety leadership from the University of San Diego.

== Sheriff ==
In 2022, Corpus ran for Sheriff of San Mateo County, California, challenging incumbent Carlos Bolanos. During her campaign, she criticized Bolanos for cooperating with federal immigration authorities by transferring detainees facing minor charges. She also advocated limiting the use of Tasers and increasing the recruitment of women within the department. Her campaign drew support from groups seeking greater oversight and accountability of the Sheriff’s Office.

In the June 2022 primary election, Corpus received 57% of the vote, defeating Bolanos outright and avoiding a November runoff. She was sworn in as sheriff on January 3, 2023.

June 2022 San Mateo County Sheriff
Candidate	Votes	%
Christina Corpus	82,622	57%
Carlos Bolanos	62,626	43%
Heinz Puschendorf	62	0%
Majority	19,996	14%

=== Half Moon Bay mass shooting ===
On January 23, 2023, the Sheriff's Office responded to a mass shooting in Half Moon Bay in which seven farmworkers were killed and one injured. Deputies arrested suspect Chunli Zhao.

During the 2025 removal proceedings, a defense witness testified that Corpus supported immigrant residents after the Half Moon Bay shooting.

=== Meliora Assessment ===
On July 18, 2024, Corpus's office released an assessment from Meliora Public Safety Consulting Meliora Assessment. Corpus said it was the first outside audit in the history of the San Mateo County Sheriff's Office.

Among other issues, the report identified staffing shortages at a "critical juncture" to the point that the office should reduce services. As of January 2024, the department had 287 sworn employees out of 383 funded positions, a 25% staffing shortage. Deputies were working extra two 12-hour shifts every two weeks, leading to challenges in morale, recruitment and retention.

=== July – November 2024: surface of complaints and start of investigation ===
In July 2024, the San Mateo County Board of Supervisors hired retired judge LaDoris Cordell to investigate HR complaints against Corpus and her Chief of Staff, Victor Aenlle. Corpus did not respond to Cordell’s offer to be interviewed.

=== Monaghan firing and claims against Chief Executive Callagy ===
In September 2024, Corpus fired Assistant Sheriff Ryan Monaghan. San Mateo County Supervisors Ray Mueller and Noelia Corzo expressed concern that Monaghan's firing came after he cooperated with the Cordell investigation, and retaliation was a possible motive in the firing. Corpus responded "When the people of San Mateo County elected me as sheriff, they entrusted me to make decisions about who I include on my executive staff. The coach picks the team. Period." Corpus accused San Mateo County Chief Executive Mike Callagy of sexual discrimination, abuse of power, and interfering with Corpus's duties, including her decision to fire Monaghan.

The county retained Oppenheimer Investigations to review her allegations. In May 2025, the firm's report cleared Callagy, with County Counsel John Nibbelin announcing that "the investigator did not substantiate any allegations that constitute misconduct on the part of Mr. Callagy." Corpus rejected the finding, stating "I stand by my complaint. Why would I make something up like that?"

=== Conflict with Deputy Union and Tapia arrest ===
In September 2024, the San Mateo County Deputy Sheriffs' Association (DSA), the union representing sheriff's deputies, passed a nonbinding vote of no confidence in Aenlle, and filed unfair labor practice complaints with the California Public Employee Relations Board (PERB). Corpus said: "no one will intimidate me into making personnel changes."

On November 12, 2024, the Sheriff's Office arrested Carlos Tapia, the president of the DSA, on suspicion of time card fraud. District Attorney Stephen Wagstaffe dropped the charges in December 2024. In April 2025, PERB found that Corpus and Aenlle had discriminated and retaliated against Tapia. In June 2025, Tapia sued Corpus for false arrest, discrimination, and retaliation.

=== Cordell report ===
On November 12, 2024, the same day of Tapia's arrest, the San Mateo County Board of Supervisors released the 400-page Report of Independent Investigation authored by Cordell. The investigation interviewed 40 current and former employees in the Sheriff's Department and concluded that (a) Corpus had "a personal relationship, beyond mere friendship" with Aenlle, and (b) Corpus violated the county's policies on nepotism and conflict of interest in hiring Aenlle. The report also found evidence to support claims that Corpus used slurs against people based on race and sexuality. The report recommended that Aenlle be fired and Corpus resign. Corpus disputed the information in the report and called it politically motivated.

In December 2024, ABC7 News Investigation Unit I-Team reported that the report had “faulty or incomplete information.”

In April 2025, Corpus's legal team released a report from retired judge Burke E. Strunsky, which stated that the Cordell report was insufficient to justify Corpus's removal due to the anonymity of witnesses and reported inaccuracies.

=== Calls to resign and Measure A ===
On November 13, 2024, the San Mateo County Board of Supervisors passed a vote of no confidence in Corpus and removed Aenlle's position as chief executive. In response, Corpus appointed Aenlle to assistant sheriff.

Elected officials Kevin Mullin, Anna Eshoo, Josh Becker, Marc Berman, and Diane Papan called on Corpus to step down. The city councils of San Carlos and Millbrae also passed votes of no confidence.

On December 3, 2024, the San Mateo County Board of Supervisors voted to hold a special election in March 2025 to temporarily grant the Board the authority to remove an elected sheriff for "cause"—a power it had not previously held. Corpus denounced the measure as “wrongheaded and anti-democratic,” calling it “a mean-spirited political scheme” designed to bypass voters and overturn the results of her election. Measure A passed with 84% support, with 108,346 votes cast from roughly 450,000 registered voters (24% turnout).

=== Removal Proceedings ===
The San Mateo County Board of Supervisors started another investigation led by the law firm Keker, Van Nest & Peters that concluded in May 2025. The Keker report said that Corpus violated the law by obstructing investigations and neglecting the duties of her office. Originally confidential, the Keker report became available to the public in July 2025 when Corpus's attorneys filed the documents unsealed.

On June 24, 2025, the San Mateo County Board of Supervisors voted unanimously to initiate removal proceedings granted under Measure A. Corpus appealed the decision. Retired judge James Emerson presided over an evidentiary hearing in August where the county and Corpus could submit testimony. On October 6, 2025, Emerson released an opinion that Corpus broke the law in conflicts of interest concerning Aenlle and acts of retaliation.

On October 14th, 2025, the San Mateo County Board of Supervisors unanimously voted to remove Corpus from office. Corpus continued to deny any wrongdoing. Hours after her removal for cause, Corpus retired with her full pension and benefits, guaranteed for life.

On November 12, 2025, the San Mateo County Board of Supervisors appointed Ken Binder to be the next Sheriff.
