= Rajeev Motwani =

Indian computer scientist (1962–2009)

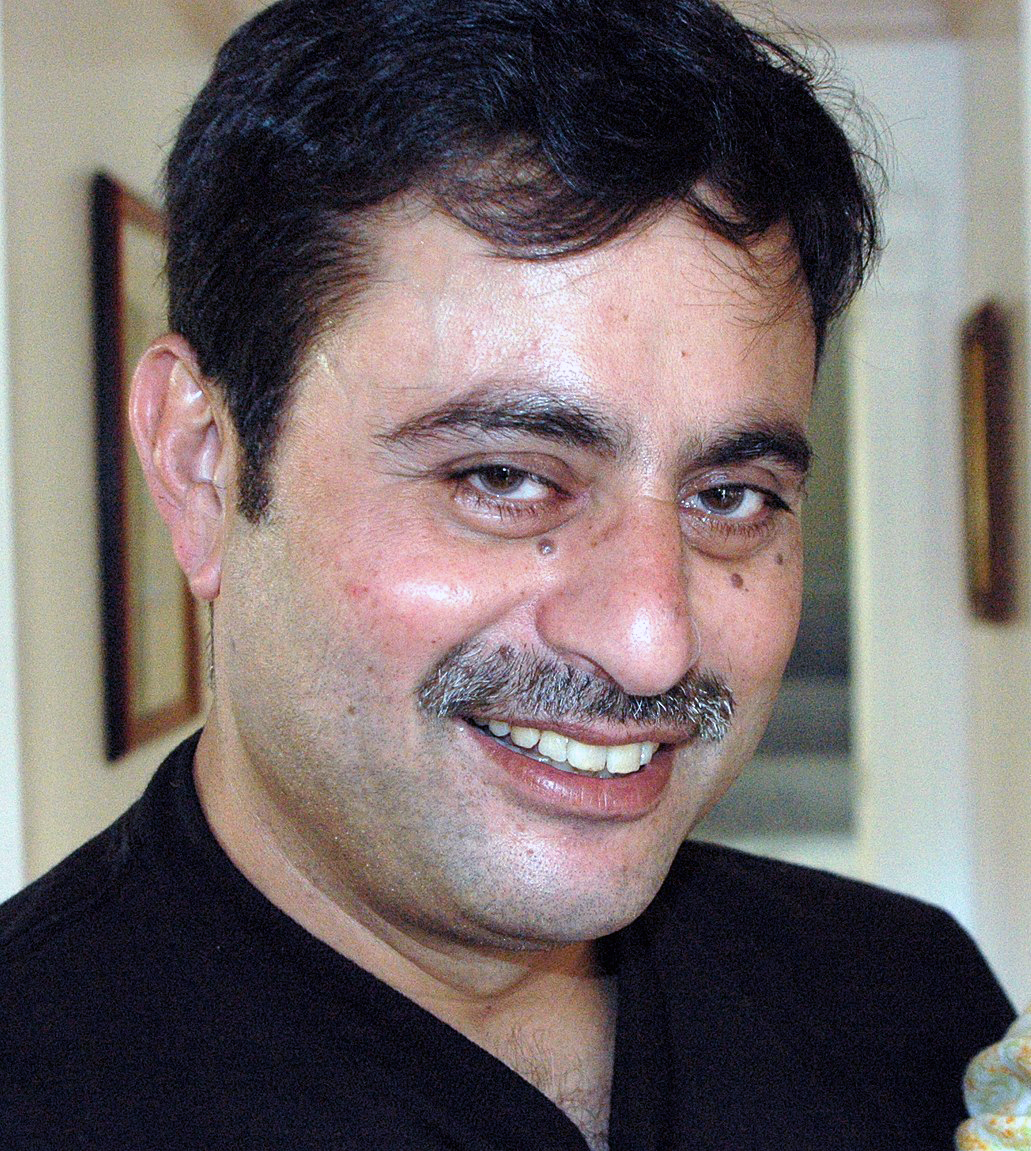
- Rajeev Motwani in 2006
- Born: Rajeev Motwani; 24 March 1962; Jammu, J&K, India
- Died: 5 June 2009 (aged 47); Atherton, California, U.S.
- Citizenship: American
- Education: St. Columba's School, Delhi
- Alma mater: IIT Kanpur (BTech); University of California, Berkeley (PhD)
- Spouse: Asha Jadeja Motwani
- Awards: Gödel Prize
- Scientific career
- Fields: Theoretical computer science Data privacy Web search Robotics; Computational drug design
- Thesis: Probabilistic Analysis of Matching and network flow Algorithms (1988)
- Doctoral advisor: Richard M. Karp
- Doctoral students: Moses Charikar; Piotr Indyk; David Karger; Sanjeev Khanna; Suresh Venkatasubramanian
- Website: theory.stanford.edu/~rajeev

Rajeev Motwani (Hindi: राजीव मोटवानी , 24 March 1962 – 5 June 2009) was an Indian-American professor of computer science at Stanford University whose research focused on theoretical computer science. He was a special advisor to Sequoia Capital. He was a winner of the Gödel Prize in 2001.

== Early life and education ==
Rajeev Motwani was born in Jammu, Jammu and Kashmir, India, on 24 March 1962, and grew up in New Delhi. His father was in the Indian Army. He had two brothers. As a child, inspired by luminaries like Gauss, he wanted to become a mathematician. Motwani went to St Columba's School, New Delhi. He completed his B.Tech. in Computer Science from the Indian Institute of Technology Kanpur in Kanpur, Uttar Pradesh in 1983 and got his Ph.D. in computer science from the University of California, Berkeley in Berkeley, California, United States in 1988, under the supervision of Richard M. Karp.

== Career ==
Motwani joined Stanford soon after U.C. Berkeley. He founded the Mining Data at Stanford project (MIDAS), an umbrella organization for several groups looking into new and innovative data management concepts. His research included data privacy, web search, robotics, and computational drug design. He is also one of the originators of the Locality-sensitive hashing algorithm.

Motwani was one of the co-authors (with Larry Page and Sergey Brin, and Terry Winograd) of an influential early paper on the PageRank algorithm. He also co-authored another seminal search paper What Can You Do With A Web In Your Pocket with those same authors. PageRank was the basis for search techniques of Google (founded by Page and Brin), and Motwani advised or taught many of Google's developers and researchers, including the first employee, Craig Silverstein.

He was an author of two widely used theoretical computer science textbooks: Randomized Algorithms with Prabhakar Raghavan and Introduction to Automata Theory, Languages, and Computation with John Hopcroft and Jeffrey Ullman.

He was an avid angel investor and helped fund a number of startups to emerge from Stanford. He sat on boards including Google, Kaboodle, Mimosa Systems (acquired by Iron Mountain Incorporated), Adchemy, Baynote, Vuclip, NeoPath Networks (acquired by Cisco Systems in 2007), Tapulous and Stanford Student Enterprises. He was active in the Business Association of Stanford Entrepreneurial Students (BASES).

He was a winner of the Gödel Prize in 2001 for his work on the PCP theorem and its applications to hardness of approximation.

== Death ==
Motwani was found dead in his pool in the backyard of his Atherton, San Mateo County, California home on 5 June 2009. The San Mateo County coroner, Robert Foucrault, ruled the death an accidental drowning. Toxicology tests showed that Motwani's blood alcohol content was 0.26 percent. He could not swim, but was planning on taking lessons, according to his friends.

== Personal life ==
Motwani, and his wife Asha Jadeja Motwani, had two daughters named Naitri and Anya. After his death, his family donated US$1.5 million in 2011 and a building was named in his honor at IIT Kanpur.

== Awards ==
- Gödel Prize in 2001
- Okawa Foundation Research Award
- Arthur Sloan Research Fellowship
- National Young Investigator Award from the National Science Foundation
- Distinguished Alumnus Award from IIT Kanpur in 2006
- Bergmann Memorial Award from the US-Israel Bi-National Science Foundation
- IBM Faculty Award
