= Michealene Risley =

American politician

Michealene Cristini Risley
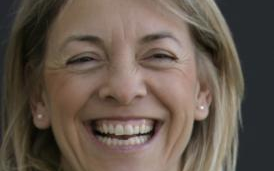
- Education: Bachelor's Degree in Telecommunications and minors in English and Advertising
- Alma mater: Bishop Foley High School Michigan State University
- Occupation: Author Activist

Michealene Cristini Risley is an American writer, documentary film director and human rights activist. She ran for the Americans Elect nomination for President of the United States in 2012. She is currently CEO and Co-Founder of Imbibe Lifestyles, a series of high quality pillows in the consumer products wellness space.

== Background ==
Risley was born and raised in Clawson, Michigan, before spending her teenage years in Troy, Michigan. She graduated from Bishop Foley High School and went on to graduate from Michigan State University with a degree in Telecommunications and minors in English and Advertising.

== Career ==
Risley's non profit was established as Freshwater Haven. The focus of that non profit was to use medial to create social change. Within this non profit, Risley is noted for her work as the writer, producer and director for the film Tapestries of Hope, which follows social activist Betty Makoni in her efforts to help sexually abused young women in Zimbabwe through her foundation the Girl Child Network. Risley was imprisoned and then deported to South Africa by the Zimbabwean government for the footage she shot during her time with Makoni and the Girl Child Network. After being safely returned to the United States, Risley became a large part of the push for the passing of the International Violence Against Women Act by creating grassroots efforts with over 45 other human rights groups. The film premiered in September 2010 in over 105 theaters nationwide.

In 2000, Risley was appointed as the VP of Production, Development and Consumer products for Marvel Comics. In 2003, she founded Fresh Water Haven, a 501(c)(3) organization that writes, produces, develops and brings to market films, documentaries and books with the goal of raising awareness about global issues that are in need of reform. A frequent Huffington Post editorial writer, Risley is a noted Human Rights Speaker. In 2003, Risley wrote, directed and produced Flashcards, a short film on child sexual abuse which won numerous awards and aired on PBS nationwide. Risley co-authored the best-selling book This Is Not the Life I Ordered, alongside Deborah Collins Stephens, Jan Yanehiro, and Jackie Speier, which has sold over 50,000 copies (the book details the friendship of these four women and the ups and downs they faced in their lives). After Running Marvels animation unit Michealene was recruited by Sega of America to build a licensing and Entertainment division from scratch. As Senior Director of Entertainment/Consumer Products at SEGA of America, she recruited and built a small group in Beverly Hills, California and eventually moved the whole team up to Sega headquarters in Northern California---where she became fascinated with the tech world and has never left Silicon Valley. In 2006, Risley founded Fresh Water Spigot, a licensing and creative services agency specializing in consumer products categories; she also conceived, developed, and launched the first Adidas-branded maternity product line, The Power of Two, LLC. Michealene was also Vice President of Games at Zynga, a San Francisco-based mobile games company. In 2019 a revised version of "This is not the life I ordered: was released. Michealene is currently creating a new television series and involved with consulting.

== Awards ==
- 2020 - Continental Who's Who List
- 2017 - Top Writer Quora
- 2010 – Silicon Valley Women of Influence award
- 2010 – Monaco Film Festival – Special Mention for Inspiration and Strong Message
- 2009 – Directors Finder Series – The Directors Guild of America
- 2009 – Best Documentary – WIFTS (The Women in Film & Television Symposium)
- 2009 – Best Director – WIFTS
- 2009 – Aloha Accolade Award – Honolulu International Film Festival
- 2009 – Award of Merit – Accolade Film Awards
- 2009 – Best Documentary – Louisville International Festival of Film
- 2009 – Award of Excellence – The Indie Fest
- 2007 – New Communications Review "Award of Excellence" for live blogs during her filming and incarceration in Zimbabwe
