= Craig Silverstein =

Google's first employee

- Born: 1972 or 1973
- Education: Harvard University; Stanford University
- Employers: Google; Khan Academy
- Spouse: Mary Obelnicki

Craig Silverstein (born 1972 or 1973) is a software engineer and was the first person employed by Larry Page and Sergey Brin at Google, having studied for a PhD alongside them (though he dropped out and never earned his degree) at Stanford University. He graduated from Harvard and was admitted to Phi Beta Kappa.

== Biography ==
Attended Eastside High School, in Gainesville, Florida.

In 1993, he won ACM-ICPC programming contest as a member of Harvard University team.

His PhD supervisor was Rajeev Motwani. He served as Google’s director of technology. He resigned from the company in February 2012, to work at the Khan Academy.

He and his wife, Mary Obelnicki, are signers of The Giving Pledge.
