= Joe Tacopina =

American lawyer (born 1966)

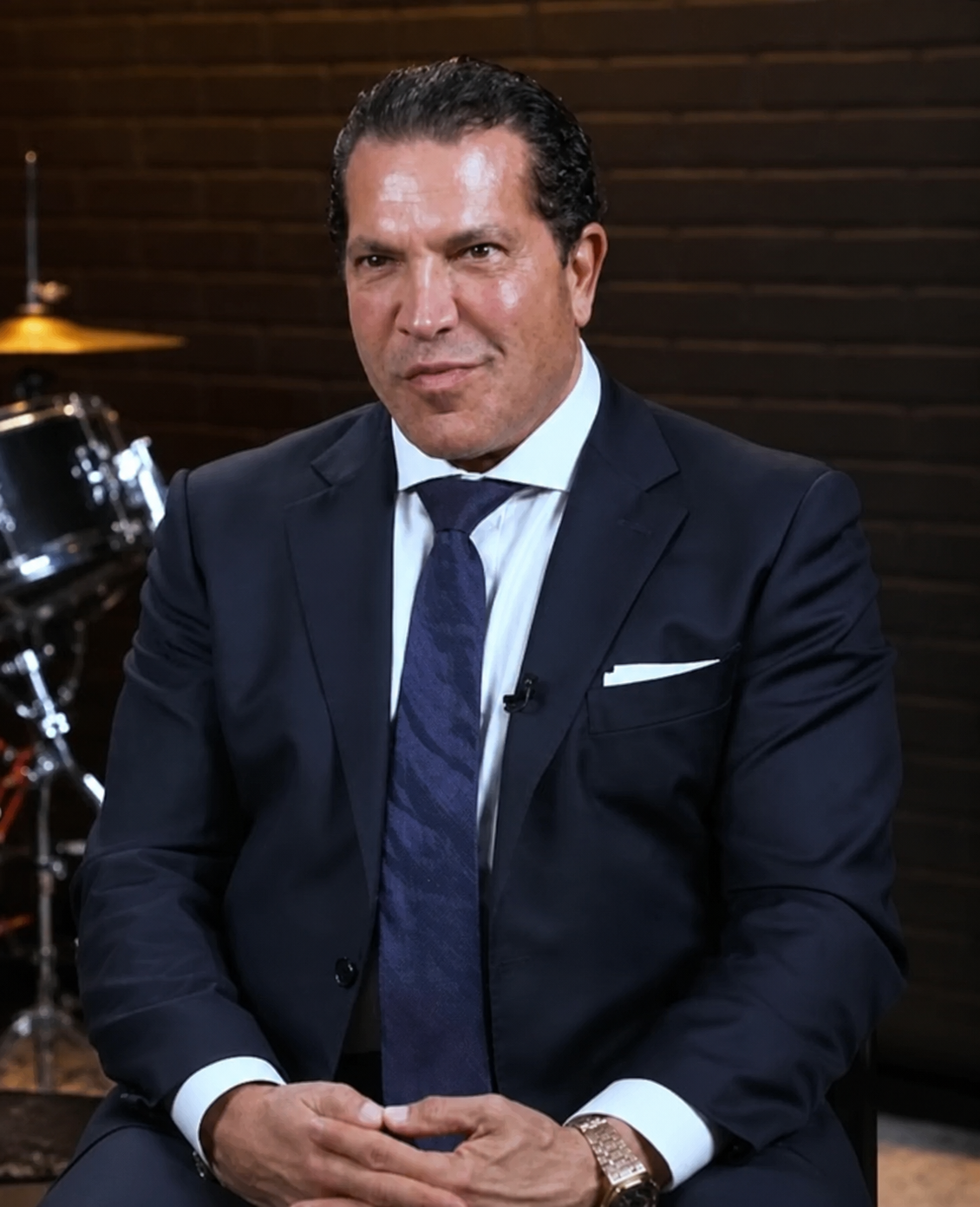
- Tacopina in 2025
- Born: April 14, 1966 (age 60); Brooklyn, New York City, U.S.
- Education: Skidmore College (BA); University of Bridgeport (JD)
- Occupations: Lawyer; media personality; sports executive

Joseph Tacopina (born April 14, 1966) is an American trial attorney and legal commentator. Widely recognized for representing high-profile clients in some of the most closely watched criminal and civil cases in the United States, Tacopina has emerged as one of the nation's most prominent trial lawyers. Forbes has recognized him among America's Top Lawyers, while The Hollywood Reporter described him as "one of the world's most sought-after trial attorneys." Over a career spanning more than three decades, he has become known for his courtroom advocacy, cross-examination skills, and involvement in nationally significant legal matters. Tacopina currently teaches trial advocacy at Harvard Law School.

== Early life and education ==
Tacopina was born in Brooklyn, New York, to Italian immigrants Cosmo Tacopina (1917–2019) and Josephine Tacopina (née Oliva; 1924–2019). His father, originally from Rome, sold packing boxes; his mother, originally from Palermo, was an accountant with the New York City Fire Department.

Tacopina was raised in Sheepshead Bay, a neighborhood in Brooklyn. He attended the private Jewish day school Yeshiva of Flatbush. He later attended Poly Prep in Brooklyn, then Skidmore College in Saratoga Springs, New York, before graduating in 1991 from the University of Bridgeport School of Law.

In addition to his trial practice, Tacopina has also been involved in legal education, teaching trial advocacy at Harvard Law School's Trial Advocacy Workshop.

He resides in Westport, Connecticut.

== Legal career ==
Tacopina is a name partner and lead trial attorney at his Manhattan-based law firm, Tacopina, Seigel & DeOreo. Tacopina began his legal career as a prosecutor in Brooklyn before transitioning to private practice, where he represented clients in criminal and civil cases. Tacopina's legal practice has included representation of Alex Rodriguez, Michael Jackson, President Donald Trump, A$AP Rocky, Meek Mill, Ne-Yo, YG, Wendy Williams, Sean Hannity, Don Imus, Senator Hiram Monserrate, Fat Joe and Kimberly Guilfoyle, among others.

He has also represented NFL team Washington Commanders and team owner Daniel Snyder.

In 2019, he served as lead trial attorney for Nauman Hussain in a high-profile criminal case. Tacopina represented Julian Khater, who had been accused of macing police officers during the attack on the U.S. Capitol on January 6, 2021.

In 2023, Tacopina represented then-former U.S. President Donald Trump in criminal and civil matters in New York, including proceedings related to state investigations.

In 2025, Tacopina served as lead defense counsel for rapper A$AP Rocky, who was acquitted of felony assault charges following a jury trial in Los Angeles.

== Media appearances and mentions ==
Tacopina has served as a legal commentator for numerous national television networks, including ABC, Fox News, CNN, MSNBC, and Newsmax. He provided legal analysis for ABC in Perugia, Italy, during coverage of the Amanda Knox case and served as an on-air legal consultant for Good Morning America. He has also guest-hosted programs on MSNBC and appeared as an attorney on the American reality television court show, You the Jury. In 2018, he was named on Billboard's most influential people in hip hop list, recognizing his work with clients in the music industry. Tacopina can be heard on WABC Radio's weekly show, Sid & Friends in the Morning, in New York.

== Association football ==
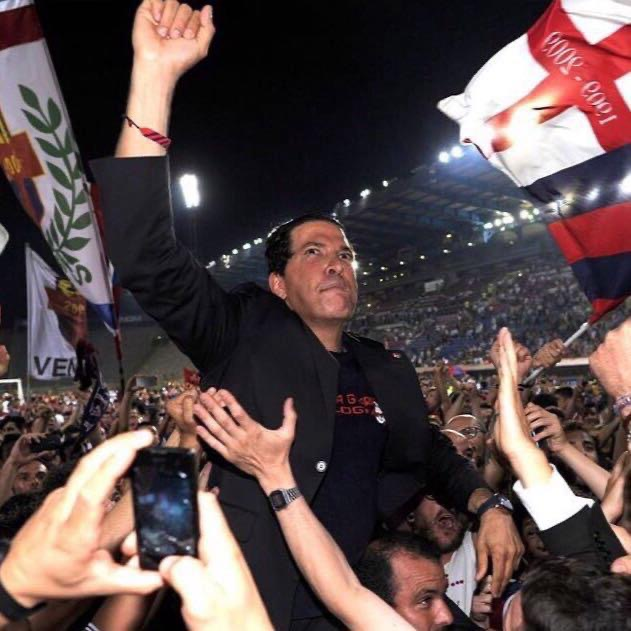
Tacopina during Bologna's promotion celebration in June 2015.

In 2011, he was part of the American consortium led by Thomas R. DiBenedetto that purchased A.S. Roma, with Tacopina becoming vice-chairman of the board of directors, in October 2011. On September 8, 2014, he resigned from the board.

A preliminary agreement to acquire Bologna F.C. 1909 was signed on September 17, 2014, and was formalized on October 8. On October 15, Tacopina officially assumed the post of president of the club. Joey Saputo was appointed as chairman on November 17, 2014. Tacopina served as president until his resignation in October 2015. As president of Bologna, Tacopina helped lead the club's return to Serie A following promotion from Serie B during the 2014–15 season.

Tacopina became president and co-owner of Venezia F.C. in October 2015. Tacopina achieved three consecutive promotions, a feat that made Tacopina the first president in Italian football history to oversee promotions in three consecutive seasons. He sold his shares and resigned in January 2020.

On August 13, 2021, Tacopina became president and owner of Italian football club SPAL of Ferrara, in Serie B or second division at the time.

== Public Service ==
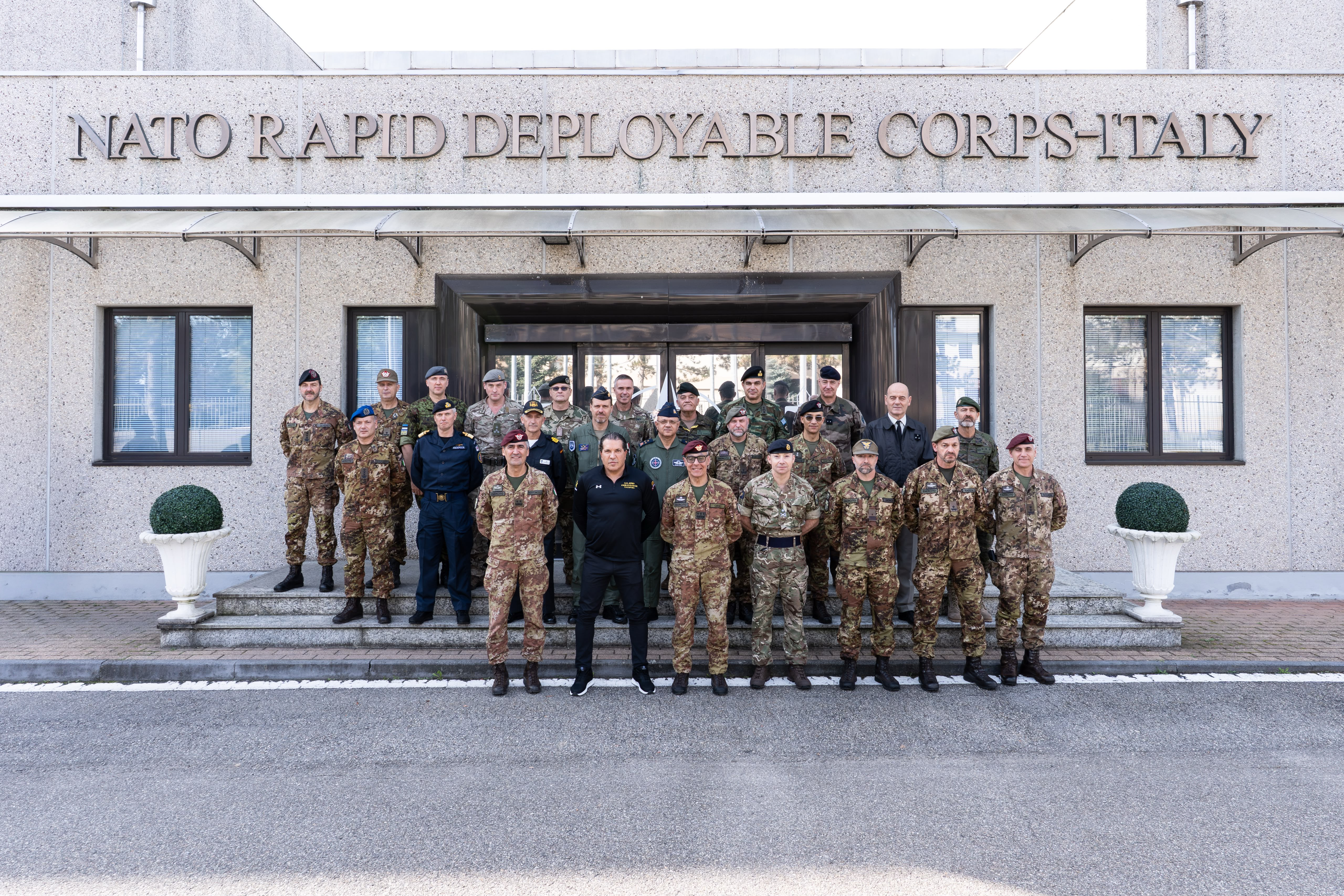
Ambassador Tacopina at the NATO Rapid Deployment Command

In 2025, the United States Army named Tacopina United States Army Ambassador, recognizing his support for service members, veterans, and Army initiatives.

== Awards ==
- Man of the Year Award from the National Italian American Bar Association;
- President’s Award for Service and Humanitarian Efforts from the National Action Network (2018)
- Man of the Year Award from New York State's Commission for Social Justice
- Recognized by Forbes as America's Top Lawyer (2025)
- Listed on Billboard's list of Top 100 Power Players in R&B and Hip-Hop (2018)
- Listed on The Hollywood Reporter's Top 35 Lawyers (2022)
- Premio Eccellenza Italiana at Georgetown University (2023)
