= 2008 California's 12th congressional district special election =

- April 8, 2008
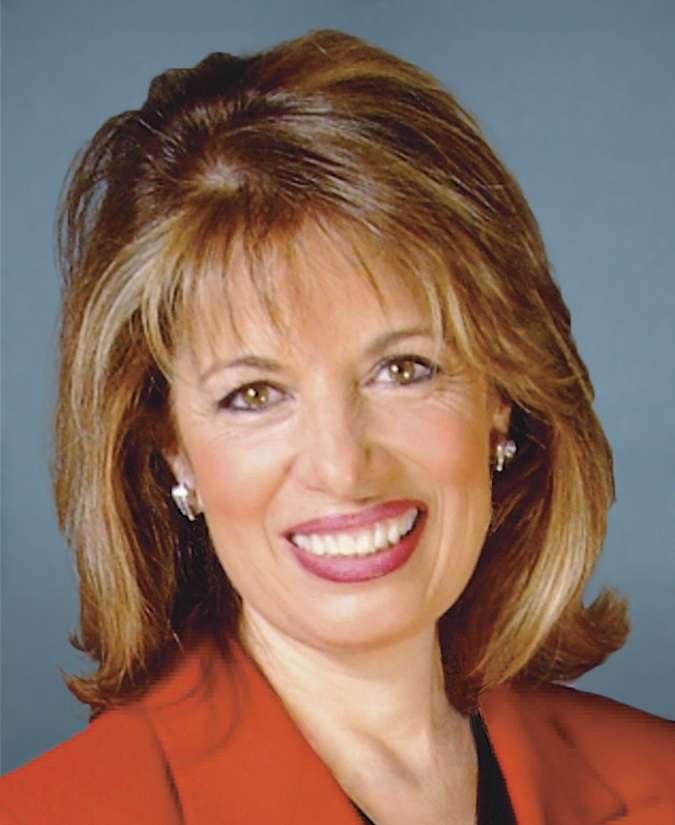

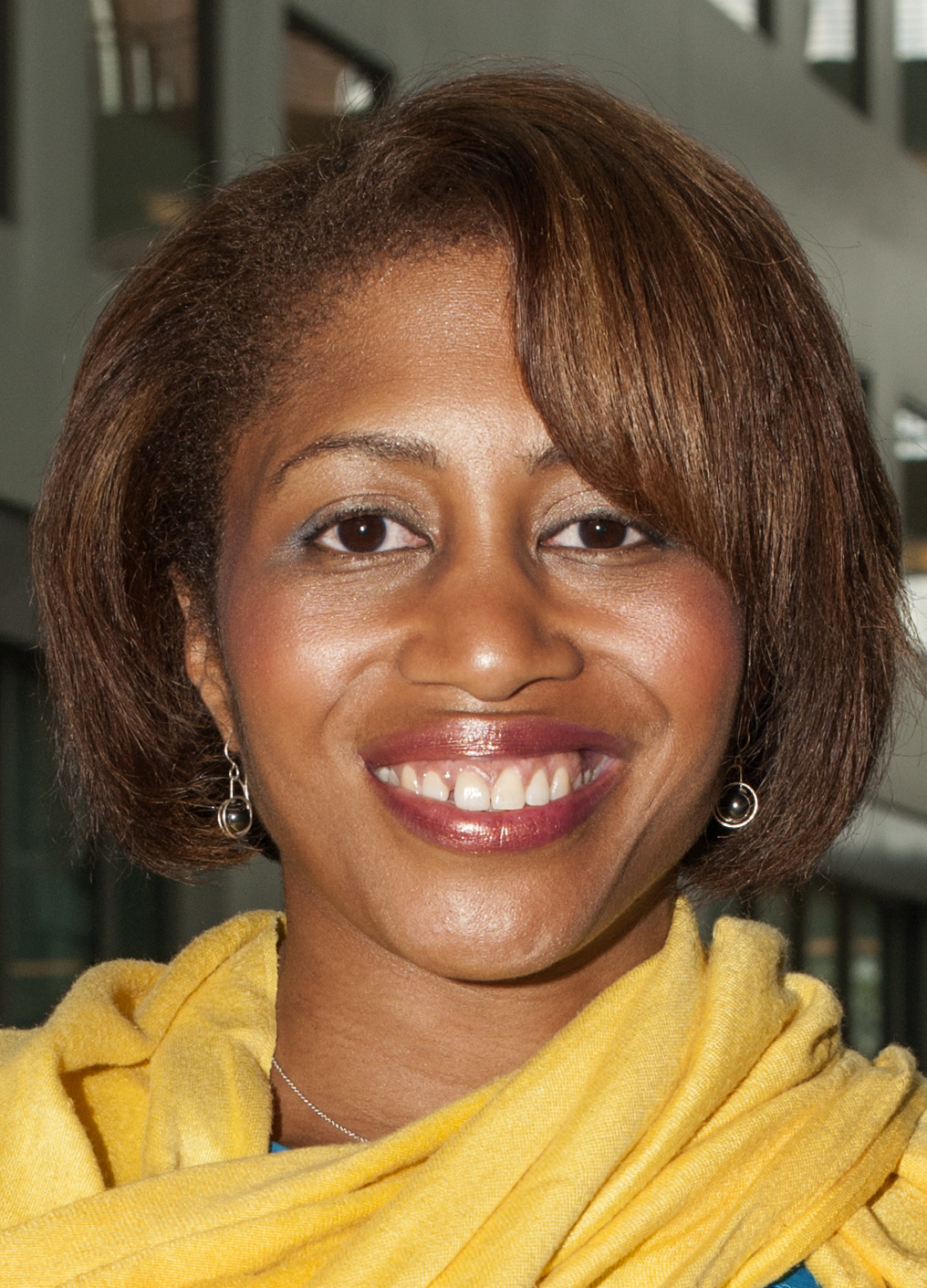

Candidate	Jackie Speier	Greg Conlon
Party	Democratic	Republican
Popular vote	66,279	7,990
Percentage	77.72%	9.37%
Candidate	Michelle McMurry	Mike Moloney
Party	Democratic	Republican
Popular vote	4,546	4,517
Percentage	5.33%	5.30%
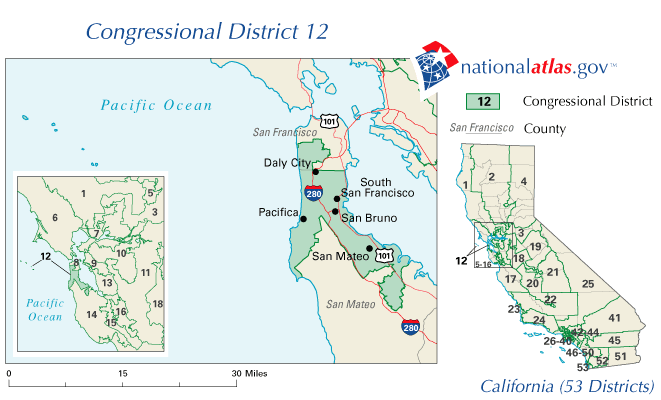
Representative before election
Tom Lantos
Democratic
Elected Representative
Jackie Speier
Democratic

California's 12th congressional district special election, 2008 occurred on April 8, 2008. California's 12th congressional district was vacated following the death of Democrat Tom Lantos on February 11, 2008. The special election was called by Governor Arnold Schwarzenegger to fill the vacancy for the remainder of Lantos's term ending on January 3, 2009. The special election took the form of an open primary. Another election would have taken place on June 3 had no candidate received a majority.

Democrat Jackie Speier won a majority of the votes in the open primary and therefore won the election.

== Candidates ==
The following individuals appeared in the certified list of candidates and the certified list of write-in candidates published by the California Secretary of State, and were thus eligible to receive votes in the special primary election.

=== Green ===
- Barry Hermanson, an equity lawyer

=== Democratic ===
- Michelle T. McMurry, a health policy director
- Jackie Speier, a former State Senator who was endorsed by Lantos as his successor

=== Libertarian ===
- Kevin Peterson, a write-in candidate

=== Republican ===
- Robert "Rock" Brickell-Viagra, a write-in candidate
- Greg Conlon, a businessman and former member of the California Public Utilities Commission, who favored deregulation.
- Mike Moloney, a retired businessman who ran for the seat in 2002 and 2006

== Results ==
California's 12th congressional district special election, 2008
Party	Candidate	Votes	%
Democratic	Jackie Speier	66,279	77.72
Republican	Greg Conlon	7,990	9.37
Democratic	Michelle McMurry	4,546	5.33
Republican	Mike Moloney	4,517	5.30
Green	Barry Hermanson	1,947	2.28
Libertarian	Kevin Peterson (write-in)	2	0.00
Valid ballots		85,281	98.95
Invalid or blank votes		903	1.05
Total votes		86,184	100.00
Turnout			25.69
Democratic hold			

=== By county ===
County	Jackie Speier Democratic		Greg Conlon Republican		Mike Moloney Republican		Michelle McMurry Democratic		Barry Hermanson Green		Kevin Peterson Libertarian		Margin		Total votes cast
County	#	%	#	%	#	%	#	%	#	%	#	%	#	%	Total votes cast
San Francisco (part)	13,810	71.46%	1,459	7.55%	1,186	6.14%	2,101	10.87%	769	3.98%	0	0.00%	11,709	60.59%	19,742
San Mateo (part)	52,469	79.55%	6,531	9.90%	3,331	5.05%	2,445	3.71%	1,178	1.79%	2	0.01%	45,938	69.65%	66,442
Totals	66,279	77.72%	7,990	10.98%	4,517	6.38%	4,546	5.88%	1,947	2.28%	2	0.01%	58,289	66.74%	86,184
