= Jackie Speier =

American politician (born 1950)

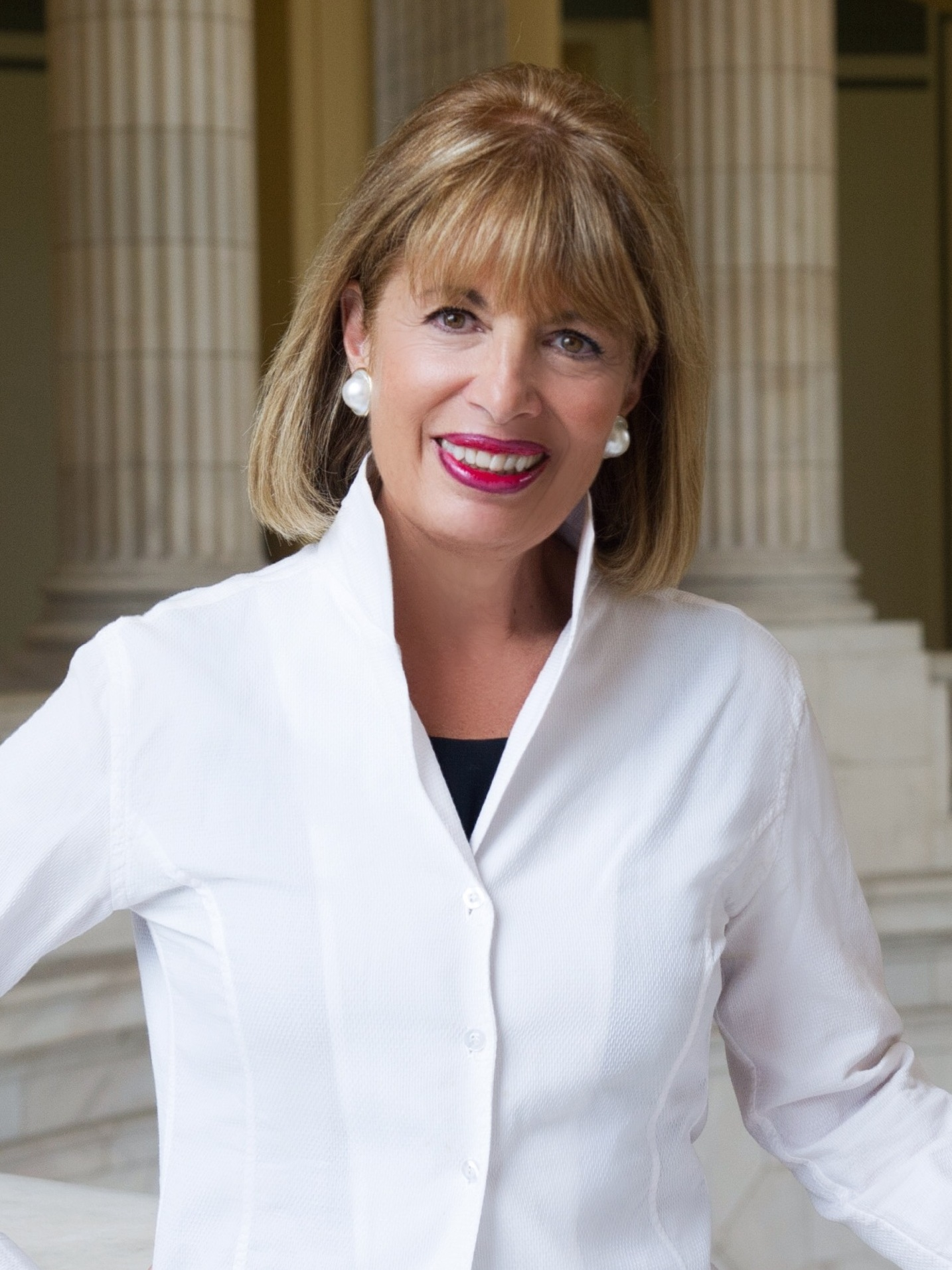
- Official portrait, 2015

Member of the San Mateo County Board of Supervisors from the 1st district
- Incumbent
- Assumed office January 7, 2025
- Preceded by: Dave Pine
- In office January 6, 1981 – November 19, 1986
- Preceded by: Jim Fitzgerald
- Succeeded by: Mary Griffin

Member of the U.S. House of Representatives from California
- In office April 10, 2008 – January 3, 2023
- Preceded by: Tom Lantos
- Succeeded by: Kevin Mullin
- Constituency: 12th district (2008–2013); 14th district (2013–2023)

Member of the California State Senate from the 8th district
- In office December 7, 1998 – November 30, 2006
- Preceded by: Quentin L. Kopp
- Succeeded by: Leland Yee

Member of the California State Assembly from the 19th district
- In office December 1, 1986 – November 30, 1996
- Preceded by: Lou Papan
- Succeeded by: Lou Papan

Personal details
- Born: Karen Lorraine Speier; May 14, 1950 (age 76) San Francisco, California, U.S.
- Party: Democratic
- Spouses: Steve Sierra (m. 1987; died 1994); Barry Dennis (m. 2001)
- Children: 2
- Education: University of California, Davis (BA); University of California, Hastings (JD)
- Speier's voice Speier opening a hearing of the House Armed Services Committee's Subcommittee on Military Personnel about sexual assault in the U.S. military. Recorded April 2, 2019

Karen Lorraine Jacqueline Speier (/spɪər/ SPEAR; born May 14, 1950) is an American lawyer and politician who served as the U.S. representative for California's 14th congressional district, serving in Congress from 2008 to 2023. A member of the Democratic Party, Speier represented much of the territory that her political mentor, Leo Ryan, represented.

In 1978, while working as his aide, Speier survived five gunshot wounds when Ryan was assassinated during the Jonestown massacre. Speier served as a member of the California State Senate, representing parts of San Francisco and San Mateo counties. On April 8, 2008, she won the special election for the vacated United States House of Representatives seat of the late Congressman Tom Lantos. In 2021, she announced that she would not seek reelection in the 2022 midterm elections. She was elected as a member of the San Mateo County Board of Supervisors in 2024.

== Early life and education ==
Speier was born in 1950 in San Francisco, and grew up in an apolitical family, the daughter of Nancy (née Kanchelian) and Manfred "Fred" Speier (German: [ˈʃpaɪ̯ɐ]). Her mother, who was born in Fresno of Armenian descent, lost most of her extended family in the Armenian genocide, while her father was an immigrant from Germany. He was the son of a Jewish father and a Catholic mother. Speier took Jacqueline as her confirmation name after Jackie Kennedy. She is a graduate of Mercy High School in Burlingame. She earned a Bachelor of Arts from the University of California, Davis, and a Juris Doctor from the University of California, Hastings College of the Law in 1976.

== Early career ==
External videos
- Q&A interview with Speier on her book Undaunted: Surviving Jonestown, Summoning Courage, and Fighting Back, November 18, 2018, C-SPAN

Speier entered politics by serving as a congressional staffer for Congressman Leo Ryan. Speier was part of his November 1978 fact-finding mission organized to investigate allegations of human rights abuses by Jim Jones and his Peoples Temple followers, almost all of whom were American citizens who had moved to Jonestown, Guyana, with Jones in 1977 and 1978.

On November 18, 1978, several Peoples Temple members ambushed the investigative team and others boarding the plane to leave Jonestown. Five people were killed, including Ryan. While trying to shield herself from rifle and shotgun fire behind small airplane wheels with other team members, Speier was shot five times and waited 22 hours before help arrived. The same day, over 900 remaining members of the Peoples Temple died in Jonestown and Georgetown in a mass murder-suicide.

== Political career ==
=== San Mateo County ===
Speier's political career began with an unsuccessful run to fill the vacancy caused by Ryan's death (the seat she held later). She lost the Democratic primary to Ryan's former chief of staff, G. W. "Joe" Holsinger. He lost the special election to the Republican nominee, San Mateo County Supervisor Bill Royer, who served the remaining 21 months of the term before losing to Tom Lantos.

Speier won her first election in 1980, when she ran for the San Mateo County Board of Supervisors and defeated a 20-year incumbent. At the time, she was the youngest person ever elected to the board. She was reelected in 1984, and was later selected as chairwoman.

In September 2023, Speier announced that she would run for the San Mateo County Board of Supervisors in 2024, more than 40 years after she was first elected to the same board.

=== California State Assembly ===
In 1986, midway through her second term on the Board of Supervisors, Speier ran for the California State Assembly from a district in northern San Mateo County. She won by a few hundred votes. She was reelected four more times, the last time as the nominee of both the Democratic and Republican parties.

=== California State Senate ===
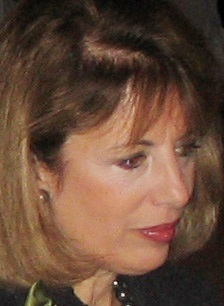
Speier while serving in the California state senate

State law prevented Speier from running for reelection to the Assembly in 1996, but in 1998 she was elected to the California State Senate. In 2002, she was elected to a second term with 78.2% of the vote. As a state senator, Speier was instrumental in securing $127 million to start the "Baby Bullet" express service for Caltrain, for which the commuter rail agency named a new locomotive (no. 925) after her. Speier also focused on representing consumer rights. She was termed out of the California State Senate in 2006. During her last term, she served as assistant president pro tempore of the State Senate.

=== Candidate for lieutenant governor of California ===
In 2006, Speier ran in the Democratic primary for lieutenant governor of California against insurance commissioner John Garamendi and state senator Liz Figueroa. In the June 6 election, Garamendi defeated Speier with 42.5% of the vote. Speier received 39.7% and Figueroa the remaining 17.8%.

== U.S. House of Representatives ==
=== Tenure ===
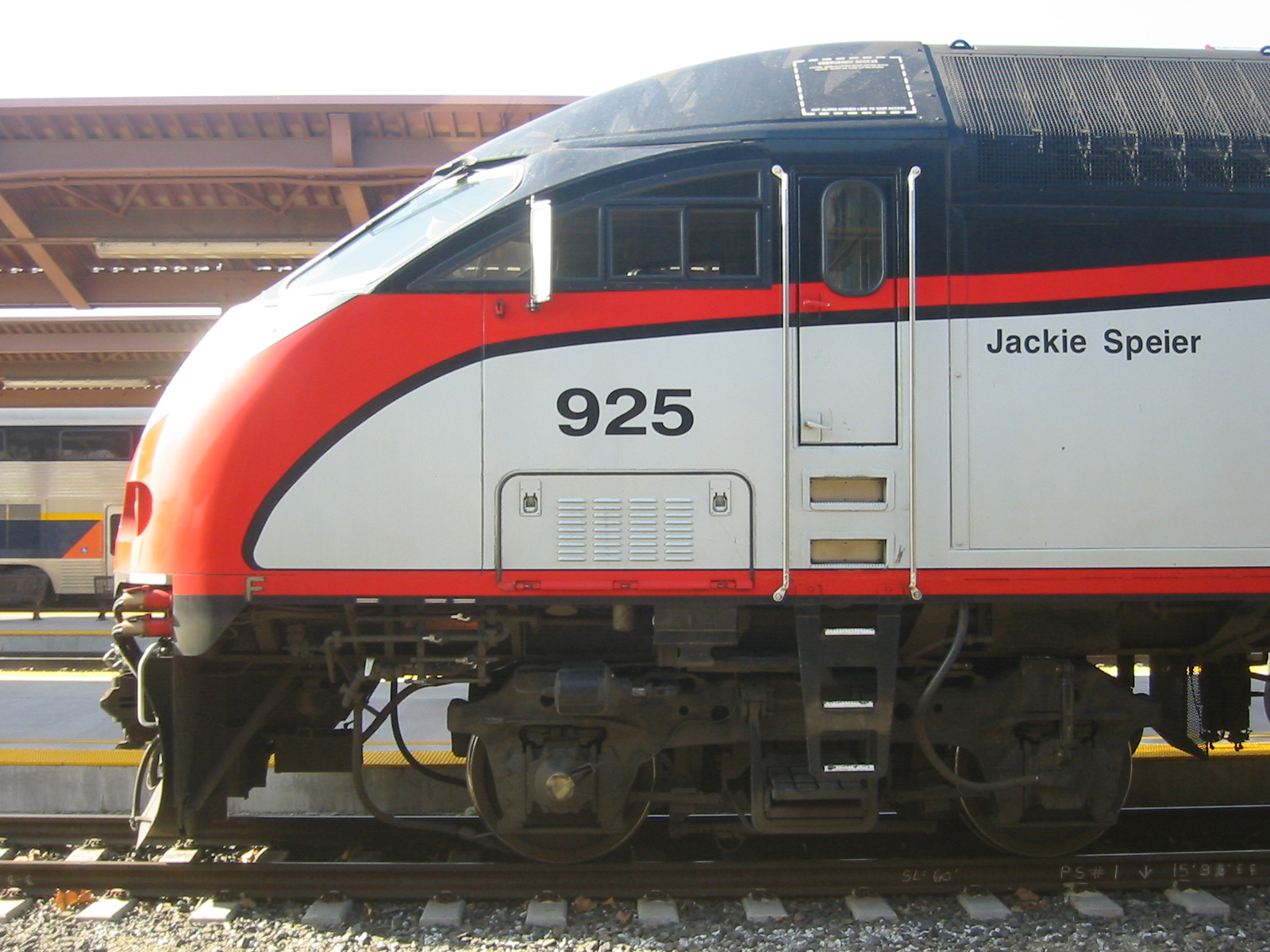
Caltrain locomotive named after Jackie Speier

On January 13, 2008, Speier announced she was running in the Democratic primary for the 12th District, Ryan's old district. The seat was being vacated by 14-term incumbent Tom Lantos, who announced on January 2, 2008, that he was not seeking reelection. Speier had spent much of 2007 building support to challenge Lantos in the Democratic primary.

On January 17, 2008, Lantos endorsed Speier as his successor. She also picked up endorsements from Congresswoman Anna Eshoo, Congressman Mike Thompson and San Francisco Mayor Gavin Newsom.

Lantos died on February 11, 2008. Speier won a special primary election on April 8, 2008, to fill the remainder of his term, which ended in January 2009. She won an outright majority, avoiding a runoff that would have been held on June 3, coinciding with the regular primary election. She was elected to a full term in November with 75% of the vote and was reelected three more times with no substantive opposition.

On July 11, 2008, Speier introduced her first bill, the Gasoline Savings and Speed Limit Reduction Act, which would set a national speed limit of 60 mph in urban areas and 65 mph on less populated stretches of highway.

In a January 2016 speech on the House floor, Speier announced that she would introduce legislation requiring schools to disclose disciplinary proceedings of faculty.

On August 16, 2017, Speier advocated the use of the Twenty-fifth Amendment to the United States Constitution to remove President Trump from office because of erratic behavior and mental instability "that place the country in great danger", following his response to the Unite the Right rally in Charlottesville, Virginia, and dealings with North Korean dictator Kim Jong-un.

In September 2016, Speier proposed a bill to stop sexual abuse and harassment of women in STEM fields known as the Federal Funding Accountability for Sexual Harassers Act.

On October 27, 2017, Speier, as part of the #MeToo movement, posted a video sharing her experience with sexual harassment on Capitol Hill. She said that when she was in her 20s, G.W. "Joe" Holsinger, a chief of staff for Representative Leo Ryan, "kissed me and stuck his tongue in my mouth." Speier called Congress a breeding ground for hostile work environments and called for more sexual harassment training. During this period, Speier spearheaded legislation that made members of Congress personally liable for financial settlements of harassment claims.

Speier and Representative Bennie Thompson sought to prohibit sleeping in United States Congress offices.

Following the election of Joe Biden as President of the United States, Speier was mentioned as a possible contender for a position in his administration, owing to her experience on national security issues. She indicated she would be willing to serve in a role in the Biden administration, but was not chosen for a position.

As of October 2021, Speier had voted in line with Joe Biden's stated position 100% of the time.

On November 16, 2021, Speier announced she would not run for reelection to Congress in 2022.

=== Committee assignments ===
- Committee on Armed Services
  - Subcommittee on Military Personnel, Chair
  - Subcommittee on Readiness
- Permanent Select Committee on Intelligence
  - Subcommittee on Counterterrorism, Counterintelligence and Counterproliferation
  - Subcommittee on Intelligence Modernization and Readiness

=== Caucus memberships ===
- Congressional Arts Caucus
- Congressional Asian Pacific American Caucus (Associate Member)
- Congressional Taiwan Caucus
- U.S.-Japan Caucus

== Political views ==
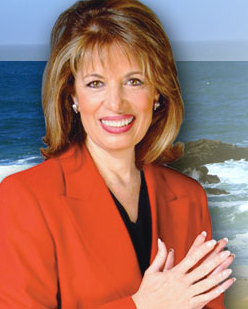
Speier during the 110th United States Congress

=== Defense ===
Speier has worked to remove cases of sexual assault and serious felonies from the chain of command in the military justice system. She introduced the I Am Vanessa Guillén Act, named for Army Spc Vanessa Guillén, on September 16, 2020, and reintroduced it on May 13, 2021. The bill would remove cases of sexual assault and sexual harassment from the chain of command, make sexual harassment a standalone offense in the Uniform Code of Military Justice, and provide a process for compensating servicemembers who survive sexual violence when the military has been negligent. She has been quoted by CNN: "This piece of legislation is going to transform a tragedy into change."

Speier introduced the Vanessa Guillén Military Justice Improvement and Increasing Prevent Act on Jun 23, 2021, which would move the decision to prosecute serious crimes in the military from the chain of command. She has been quoted by NPR: "We're here today for the service members who have spoken out or who have suffered in silence because the message and culture in the military has been clear: Shut up, suck it up and don't rock the boat."

Speier is a critic of the F35 Joint Strike Fighter Program. She has been quoted by CNN: "To continue pouring money into building planes that have ejector seat issues, cyber vulnerabilities, flawed aerodynamics, maintenance problems, an inability to fly at full speed while using weapons, and overheating issues is borderline malfeasance."

Speier co-sponsored the Protecting NATO Skies Act of 2019 to prevent the delivery of F-35s to Turkey after Turkish President Recep Tayyip Erdogan agreed to purchase and deploy Russian S-400 air defense systems.

=== Abortion ===
Speier supports legal abortion. When she took the National Political Awareness Test in 2002, she answered, "Abortions should always be legally available." The organization NARAL Pro-Choice America rated Speier as 100% on interest group ratings because she supported the choice of abortion in her voting for legislation. Also in 2008 the Planned Parenthood Organization gave Speier a 100% on her actions regarding abortion. In a February 17, 2011, speech on the House floor, Speier said that she herself had undergone an emergency D&E procedure when complications developed in a wanted pregnancy.

Speier opposed the Trump administration's reinstatement and expansion of the Mexico City Policy, which blocks foreign nongovernmental organizations (NGOs) that receive U.S. health aid from providing referrals for abortion services with their own funding. Research shows that by limiting access to care, this policy has previously led to a 14% decrease in contraceptive use, 12% increase in pregnancies, and 40% increase in abortion rates. She is a cosponsor of H.R. 1055, the Global HER Act, to permanently repeal the Global Gag Rule.

Speier opposed the 2022 overturning of Roe v. Wade, calling the decision "government mandated pregnancy."

=== Gun laws ===
Speier believes in stricter gun control. According to her answers on the NPAT (National Political Awareness Test) she would like to require safety locks on all guns and background checks on prospective buyers as well as ban certain guns (other than for hunting) and strengthen state restrictions on buying and owning guns. Gun Owners of America gave her an "F" grade and the Brady Campaign to Prevent Gun Violence and the Jack Berman Advocacy Center gave her a 100% rating. The NRA Political Victory Fund (NRA-PVF) and Gun Owners of California also gave Speier consistently low grades on gun rights.

=== Environment and energy ===
Speier is concerned for the protection of the environment. She cites the decline of salmon on the West Coast as evidence of global warming. Speier believes global warming poses a growing danger and negatively affects the environment. When she spoke to the House on the subject, she expressed a desire "to craft a bipartisan and commonsense energy plan that makes polluters pay, provides for middle-class energy tax credits, and creates a new industry and lots of good, clean, green jobs". Speier worked to improve energy legislation with the Clean Air Rebate Act of 2009, the Home Star Act and the American Clean Energy and Security Act.

=== Foreign policy ===
In January 2019, Speier introduced H.R. 1028, the RIGHT Act, to prevent foreign money from influencing U.S. elections. She also introduced the PUTIN Act in 2017, legislation to prevent any federal funding for a cybersecurity unit with Russia, as proposed by then President Donald Trump.

On June 27, 2019, Speier introduced a resolution condemning the murder of journalist Jamal Khashoggi and demanding a reevaluation of the U.S. relationship with Saudi Arabia from the secretary of state in response to reports of numerous violations of the human rights of Saudi activists.

Speier tweeted in support of Israel in the immediate aftermath of the October 7 attacks in 2023.

=== Human rights ===
Speier formed the bipartisan Congressional Unexploded Ordnance/Demining Caucus in 2018 to address unexploded ordnance and mines from the U.S. and other countries throughout the world that impact post-conflict economic and social development.

Speier led the successful effort to secure funding in the FY 2020 House-passed appropriations bill for humanitarian demining assistance and ensured that unclassified Department of Defense demining research would be shared with humanitarian demining organizations.

In September 2017, as co-chair of the Ahmadiyya Caucus, Speier condemned the human rights abuses perpetrated against the Rohingya Muslims in Myanmar and supported assistance programs that help partner nations build accountable, transparent governance structures.

Speier opposed the Trump administration's unilateral cuts to the UN Population Fund (UNFPA), which works in more than 150 countries to end preventable maternal deaths, provide voluntary family planning, combat gender-based violence such as child marriage, and train health care workers. She led a letter with 145 of her colleagues urging the administration to reverse its decision to withhold U.S. funding.

Speier also supports efforts to educate girls worldwide, eradicate gender-based violence, promote women's participation in peace and security efforts, and ensure their access to jobs and an economic marketplace free from discrimination.

As co-chair of the bipartisan Congressional Armenian Caucus and an Armenian American, Speier works to build close U.S.-Armenia cooperation with Armenian American groups, the State Department, USAID, and the Armenian government. That includes her amendment that passed the House to provide more than $40 million to Armenian Democracy Assistance and establish direct flights between California and Yerevan.

=== LGBT equality ===
Speier supports same-sex marriage. She was a member of the Congressional LGBTQ+ Equality Caucus.

== Electoral history ==
California Congressional District 11, special election (round 1) March 6, 1979
Party	Candidate	Votes	%
Democratic	G. W. Holsinger	20,908	24.3
Republican	William Royer	19,592	22.7
Democratic	George Corey	15,470	18.0
Democratic	Jackie Speier	13,744	16.0
Republican	Les Kelting	6,578	7.6
Republican	Bruce Makar	6,012	7.0
Democratic	Curtiss Landers	1,475	1.7
Republican	Roger B. Canfield	934	1.1
Democratic	Charles T. Plough	731	0.8
American Independent	Nicholas Waeil Kudrovzeff	372	0.4
Peace and Freedom	Wilson Branch	310	0.4
Total votes		86,126	100
Turnout			

California State Assembly District 19 election, 1986
Party	Candidate	Votes	%
Democratic	Jackie Speier	56,809	73.9
Republican	Michael Rocco	20,010	26.1
Total votes		76,819	100
Turnout			
Democratic hold			

California State Assembly District 19 election, 1988
Party	Candidate	Votes	%
Democratic	Jackie Speier (incumbent)	67,584	77.2
Republican	Robert Silvestri	18,240	20.8
Peace and Freedom	Gene Pepi	1,732	2.0
Total votes		87,556	100
Turnout			
Democratic hold			

California State Assembly District 19 election, 1990
Party	Candidate	Votes	%
Democratic	Jackie Speier (incumbent)	53,359	100
Total votes		53,359	100
Turnout			
Democratic hold			

California State Assembly District 19 election, 1992
Party	Candidate	Votes	%
Democratic	Jackie Speier (incumbent)	108,428	75.1
Republican	Ellyne Berger	36,020	24.9
Total votes		144,448	100
Turnout			
Democratic hold			

California State Assembly District 19 election, 1994
Party	Candidate	Votes	%
Democratic	Jackie Speier (incumbent)	100,602	93.1
Peace and Freedom	David Reichard	7,459	6.9
Total votes		108,061	100
Turnout			
Democratic hold			

California State Senate District 8 election, 1998
Party	Candidate	Votes	%
Democratic	Jackie Speier	167,216	79.2
Republican	Jim Tomlin	43,936	20.8
Total votes		211,152	100
Turnout			
Democratic gain from Independent			

California State Senate District 8 election, 2002
Party	Candidate	Votes	%
Democratic	Jackie Speier (incumbent)	158,999	78.2
Republican	Dennis Zell	38,881	19.1
Libertarian	Robert Fliegler	5,540	2.7
Total votes		203,420	100
Turnout			
Democratic hold			

California Democratic Party Lieutenant Gubernatorial primary election, June 6, 2006
Party	Candidate	Votes	%
Democratic	John Garamendi	1,045,130	42.6
Democratic	Jackie Speier	975,547	39.7
Democratic	Liz Figueroa	436,868	17.7
Total votes		2,457,545	100
Turnout			

California's 12th Congressional District special election, April 8, 2008
Party	Candidate	Votes	%
Democratic	Jackie Speier	66,279	77.7
Republican	Greg Conlon	7,990	9.4
Democratic	Michelle McMurry	4,546	5.3
Republican	Mike Moloney	4,517	5.3
Green	Barry Hermanson	1,947	2.3
Independent	Kevin Dempsey Peterson (write-in)	2	nil
Valid ballots		85,281	
Invalid or blank votes			
Total votes		85,281	100
Turnout			25.69
Democratic hold			

United States House of Representatives elections, 2008
Party	Candidate	Votes	%
Democratic	Jackie Speier	200,442	75.2
Republican	Greg Conlon	49,258	18.5
Peace and Freedom	Nathalie Hrizi	5,793	2.2
Green	Barry Hermanson	5,776	2.1
Libertarian	Kevin Dempsey Peterson	5,584	2.0
Total votes		266,853	100
Turnout			
Democratic hold			

United States House of Representatives elections, 2010
Party	Candidate	Votes	%
Democratic	Jackie Speier	152,044	75.6
Republican	Mike Moloney	44,475	22.2
Libertarian	Mark Paul Williams	4,611	2.2
Independent	Joseph Michael Harding (write-in)	32	nil
Total votes		201,162	100
Turnout			
Democratic hold			

United States House of Representatives elections, 2012
Party	Candidate	Votes	%
Democratic	Jackie Speier	203,828	78.9
Republican	Debbie Bacigalupi	54,455	21.1
Total votes		258,283	100
Turnout			
Democratic hold			

United States House of Representatives elections, 2014
Party	Candidate	Votes	%
Democratic	Jackie Speier	114,389	76.7
Republican	Robin Chew	34,757	23.3
Total votes		149,146	100
Turnout			
Democratic hold			

United States House of Representatives elections, 2016
Party	Candidate	Votes	%
Democratic	Jackie Speier	231,630	80.9
Republican	Angel Cardenas	54,817	19.1
Total votes		286,447	100
Turnout			
Democratic hold			

United States House of Representatives elections, 2018
Party	Candidate	Votes	%
Democratic	Jackie Speier	211,384	79.2
Republican	Cristina Osmeña	55,439	20.8
Total votes		266,823	100
Turnout			
Democratic hold			

United States House of Representatives elections, 2020
Party	Candidate	Votes	%
Democratic	Jackie Speier	278,300	79.3
Republican	Ran S. Petel	72,705	20.7
Total votes		351,005	100
Turnout			
Democratic hold			

== Books ==
- This Is Not the Life I Ordered: 50 Ways to Keep Your Head Above Water When Life Keeps Dragging You Down, by Deborah Collins Stephens, Michealene Cristini Risley, Jackie Speier, and Jan Yanehiro, 2007, ISBN 978-1573243056
- Undaunted: Surviving Jonestown, Summoning Courage, and Fighting Back, by Jackie Speier, 2018, ISBN 978-1503903609

== Personal life ==
Speier's first marriage was to Steven Sierra, an emergency-room doctor, in 1987. In 1988, they had a son, Jackson Kent, while she was a member of the California State Assembly. Sierra died in a car crash in 1994 at age 53. At the time, Speier was two months pregnant with their second child, a daughter named Stephanie. Stephanie is now a reporter for ABC's local affiliate in the San Francisco Bay Area.

In 2001, Speier married Barry Dennis, an investment consultant.

Speier is Roman Catholic.

== See also ==
- Women in the United States House of Representatives

U.S. House of Representatives
Preceded by Tom Lantos	Member of the U.S. House of Representatives from California's 12th congressional district 2008–2013	Succeeded by Nancy Pelosi
Preceded by Anna Eshoo	Member of the U.S. House of Representatives from California's 14th congressional district 2013–2023	Succeeded by Eric Swalwell
Party political offices
Preceded by Lois Frankel as Chair of the Democratic Women's Working Group	Chair of the Democratic Women's Caucus; 2019–2023; Served alongside: Lois Frankel, Brenda Lawrence	Succeeded by Lois Frankel
U.S. order of precedence (ceremonial)
Preceded by Jerry McNerney as Former U.S. Representative	Order of precedence of the United States as Former U.S. Representative	Succeeded by Todd Tiahrt as Former U.S. Representative
