= This Is Not the Life I Ordered =

- Book cover
- Author: Deborah Collins Stephens, Michealene Cristini Risley, Jackie Speier, Jan Yanehiro
- Illustrator: John Grimes
- Cover artist: Jessica Dacher
- Language: English
- Subject: Self-help
- Genre: Non-fiction
- Publisher: Conari Press
- Publication date: March 2007
- Publication place: United States
- Media type: Hardcover
- Pages: 220
- ISBN: 1-57324-305-1

This Is Not the Life I Ordered: 50 Ways to Keep Your Head Above Water When Life Keeps Dragging You Down is a collaborative non-fiction inspirational self-help book written by Deborah Collins Stephens, Michealene Cristini Risley, Jackie Speier, and Jan Yanehiro. The book was first published in a hardcover format in 2007, by Conari Press. The first printing of the work was for thirty-five thousand copies, and a second printing is planned.

== About the authors ==
The four authors were all friends prior to writing the book. Jackie Speier is a Congresswoman from California, and was a candidate for Lieutenant Governor of California in 2006. Speier survived five gunshot wounds when she was shot by members of Peoples Temple in 1978 when she traveled to Jonestown with Congressman Leo J. Ryan. Jan Yanehiro is a broadcast journalist, and co-hosted Evening Magazine which aired on San Francisco's KPIX. Yanehiro is a co-executive producer of "Pacific Fusion", a television magazine program featuring Asian American lifestyle, which airs on KRON.

Michealene Cristini Risley was vice-president, group director of licensing and character development, at Sega Corporation. She is also the founder and president of Fresh Water Spigot, a creative content company based in Portola Valley, California. Deborah Collins Stephens is the cofounder and managing partner of the Center for Innovative Leadership. She is also the author of One Size Fits One and co-authored The Maslow Business Reader, with Abraham H. Maslow.

== Contents ==
In the book, the authors share advice gained from personal experiences on topics including family life, work, and love - and the difficulties of balancing these issues. As the title suggests, the book offers fifty ways in which the reader can stay focused and upbeat when misfortune strikes. The book is structured topically, with each chapter dealing with different types of issues such as dealing with misfortune, managing mistakes, understanding money and how to network with other women. Each chapter concludes with a "WIT (Women in Transition) Kit," which contains action plans and exercises related to the previous section. The chapter "Understanding Money and a Women’s Worth" provides "straightforward directives" on topics such as net worth, tax returns and how to create a financial plan.

== Reception ==
This Is Not the Life I Ordered reached the best seller list of the San Francisco Chronicle for the second time in June 2007. The book also appeared on the NCIBA bestseller list, and was featured on the "Sacramento 07 Books" list, by the Professional BusinessWomen of California organization. This Is Not the Life I Ordered received a positive review in ForeWord Magazine, where the reviewer noted that the work: "is more about 'turning ‘woe is me’ into action' than coddling."

== See also ==
- Women's health
- Women's studies
