= You the Jury =

- Presented by: Jeanine Pirro
- Country of origin: United States
- Original language: English
- No. of seasons: 1
- No. of episodes: 2

Production
- Running time: Approx. 60 minutes
- Production companies: Renegade 83; Ember Dot

Original release
- Network: Fox
- Release: April 14, 2017

You the Jury is an American reality prime time court show which aired on Fox as a live program, where high-profile civil cases were re-enacted with lawyers known for working on high-profile cases, along with a live audience and viewer voting about their opinion of whether they agree or disagree with the defendant (although any decision made by the show had no legal effect). Premiering on April 7, 2017, the series was hosted by former New York State jurist and current Fox News Channel host Jeanine Pirro.

The series was canceled after two episodes had aired.

== Cast ==
- Jeanine Pirro - Host
- LaDoris Cordell - Judge

The show intended to cycle through six attorneys known for working on high-profile cases. Only three appeared defending or prosecuting in the two released episodes. These attorneys include:

- Charla Aldous
- Jose Baez (Episode 1 and Episode 2 defending)
- Mike Cavalluzzi
- Benjamin L. Crump (Episode 2 prosecuting)
- Areva Martin
- Joe Tacopina (Episode 1 prosecuting)

== Episodes ==
No.	Title	Original release date	Prod. code	US viewers (millions)
1	"Aruba"	April 7, 2017	YTJ-108	1.54
TBA Plaintiff: Danielle Unglesbee (with Tacopina) vs. Defendant: Gary Giordano (with Baez)
2	"Online Racism"	April 14, 2017	YTJ-104	1.20
TBA Plaintiff: Sydney Shelton (with Crump) vs. Defendant: Gerod Roth (with Baez)
