= LaDoris Cordell =

American judge (born 1949)

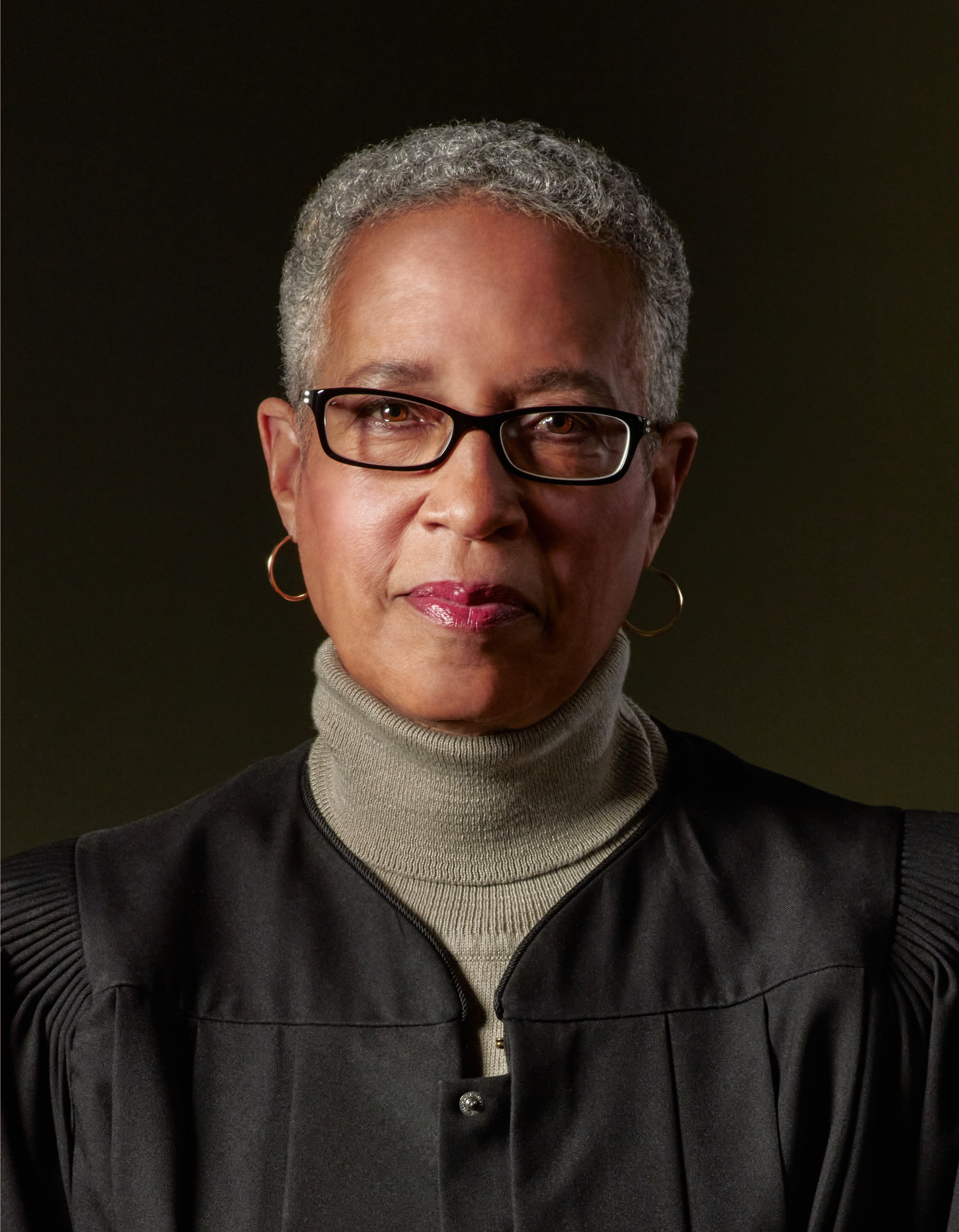

Judge of the Superior Court, Santa Clara County, San Jose, California
- In office June 1988 – February 2001

Judge of the Municipal Court, Santa Clara County, San Jose, California
- In office April 1982 – June 1988
- Appointed by: Jerry Brown

Personal details
- Born: LaDoris Louise Hazzard; November 19, 1949 (age 76) Bryn Mawr, Pennsylvania, U.S.
- Education: Antioch College (BA); Stanford University (JD)
- Website: Official website

LaDoris Hazzard Cordell (born November 19, 1949) is an American retired judge of the Superior Court of California, and a retired Independent Police Auditor for the City of San José, California.

As the Assistant Dean for Student Affairs at Stanford Law School (1978–82), Cordell developed an admissions program that led to a dramatic increase in the number of African American and Latino students at the law school. Within a year, Stanford Law School went from last to first place in the enrollment of students of color among major law schools.

Cordell was the first female African American judge in Northern California, and the first African American Superior Court judge in Santa Clara County, California. For more than a decade, she taught judicial conduct and ethics at B. E. Witkin Judicial College of California.

== Education ==
Before becoming a lawyer, Judge Cordell graduated from Antioch College in 1971 with a bachelor of arts. She graduated from Stanford Law School in 1974 with a juris doctor.

== Career ==
In 1975, Cordell was the first person in the Western United States to serve as the Earl Warren Intern at the NAACP Legal Defense and Education Fund. From 1976 to 1982, she practiced as a private attorney in East Palo Alto, specializing in criminal defense law, personal injury law, family law, and federal civil rights law. From 1978 to 1982, she was assistant dean for Student Affairs at Stanford Law School.

In 1982, California governor Edmund Gerald “Jerry” Brown, Jr. appointed Cordell to be a municipal court judge for the County of Santa Clara; she was the first California judge to order breath devices installed into the cars of drivers convicted of driving while under the influence of alcohol, and was presiding judge from 1985 to 1986.

In 1988, she was elected to become a judge for the Santa Clara County Superior Court, where she served as supervising judge for the probate court from 1994 to 1995; supervising judge of the family court from 1990 to 1992, and presiding judge of the superior court appellate department in 1993.

In 1990, Cordell founded the African American Donor Task Force to increase Black participation in the national bone marrow registry.

In 1996, all proceeds from Cordell's first artwork exhibition (Chiaroscuro: An Exhibition of Works on Paper) were donated to the Support Network for Battered Women's crisis services for African American women and their children. In 1998, 1999, and 2000, sales of calendars featuring legal cartoons drawn by Judge Cordell generated several thousand dollars for Legal Advocates for Children & Youth (LACY); a nonprofit legal service for Santa Clara County's youth. And in 2002, a second art exhibit and auction of her artwork and cartoon calendar raised over $13,000 for the East Palo Alto Mural Art Project.

From 2001 to 2009, Cordell served as Stanford University's vice provost and special counselor to the president for campus relations, where she supervised the Office for Campus Relations. In a campaign in which she refused monetary contributions, she was elected to the Palo Alto City Council in 2004, where she served until 2008. From 2010 to 2015, she served as Independent Police Auditor (IPA) for the City of San Jose, CA.

In 2014, Cordell co-founded the African American Composer Initiative (AACI); an organization whose mission is to bring the music of these past and present composers to the world through live concerts, and online recordings.

In 2015, Cordell was a member of the Blue Ribbon Panel on Transparency, Accountability, and Fairness in Law Enforcement. In the wake of revelations that 14 San Francisco Police Department (SFPD) officers had exchanged numerous racist, and homophobic text messages, the panel was established as an advisory body to the District Attorney of San Francisco, George Gascón. Composed of three retired judges from outside the city, and supported by attorneys from seven Bay Area law firms, the panel's final report with 72 findings and 81 recommendations was accepted by the City and County of San Francisco's Board of Supervisors.

Also in 2015, Cordell was the Chairwoman of the 26-member Blue Ribbon Commission on Improving Custody Operations. The commission was established after 3 correctional guards allegedly beat to death mentally ill inmate Michael Tyree in the Santa Clara County jail. The commission's final report included 120 recommendations to protect inmates' rights, and was accepted by Santa Clara County's Board of Supervisors.

In 2018, Cordell led the opposition to the voter recall campaign of fellow Stanford Law School graduate, and Santa Clara County Judge, Aaron Persky. After Persky's sentencing of Stanford University student Brock Turner to 6 months in the county jail for the January 18, 2015 sexual assault and attempted rape of an unconscious 22-year-old woman (People v. Turner), a public backlash led to the successful June 5, 2018 recall of Persky.

In the aftermath of a racially charged incident involving a Black female Santa Clara University professor, and campus police officers in August 2020, Cordell conducted an audit of the university's Public Safety Services Department (PSSD). While she did not participate in the investigation, Cordell urged the university to implement her 22 recommendations “as quickly as possible.”

Also in 2020, Cordell was appointed to the San Francisco District Attorney’s Innocence Commission; a panel of five experts volunteering their time to evaluate cases where an incarcerated person asserts that they were wrongfully convicted. Established under recalled DA Chesa Boudin, the San Francisco Board of Supervisors unanimously called on newly appointed DA Brooke Jenkins to preserve the commission in 2022.

From 1969 to December 17, 2020, non-residents faced jail time or fines up to $1,000 for visiting the City of Palo Alto’s Foothills Park. Represented by the ACLU of Northern California, Cordell was a plaintiff in the successful lawsuit to lift the residents-only restriction.

Upon publication of her book in 2021, Her Honor: My Life on the Bench...What Works, What's Broken, and How to Change It, Cordell was interviewed as the guest on the KQED radio program Forum, and discussed a number of the problems she considered to be present in the legal system. She described her book as a “primoir”; a combination of a primer and a memoir.

In 2022, Cordell was featured in The Recall: Reframed; a short documentary by Rebecca Richman Cohen that takes issue with the “Recall Persky” campaign.

In July 2024, San Mateo County, California hired Cordell to conduct a fact-finding investigation into HR complaints against the County Sheriff's Office. In the resulting 408-page Report of Independent Investigation released on November 12, 2025, Cordell concluded: “Lies, secrecy, intimidation, retaliation, conflicts of interest, and abuses of authority are the hallmarks of the [Christina Corpus] administration. This investigator takes no pleasure in recommending that Sheriff Corpus step down and that [her Chief of Staff] Victor Aenlle’s employment with the Sheriff’s Office be terminated immediately. Nothing short of new leadership can save this organization."

In a March 2025 letter to the chairperson of the San Francisco District Attorney’s Innocence Commission, Judge Cordell cited the reason for her resignation: "The place for a prosecutor to disagree with a judge’s ruling is in the courtroom, not on social media and not in the streets, pandering to voters. District Attorney Brooke Jenkins’ incendiary attacks on San Francisco’s judiciary are anathema to judicial independence and they jeopardize the safety of our judges."

On Constitution Day, September 17, 2025, Judge Cordell was one of 100 retired California judges to sign a Declaration of Judicial Independence. Alarmed over escalating personal threats to judges and the erosion of public trust, the signatories pledged to "not allow irresponsible and false attacks on California’s judiciary to go unanswered [and] to use every lawful and appropriate means necessary to protect not only California’s independent judiciary, but liberty and justice for all of those whose lives depend upon its existence."

Cordell is a frequent legal commentator for news outlets including CNN, MSNBC, and NPR. She is quoted in the New York Times, the Wall Street Journal, and the Los Angeles Times; is a Commonwealth Club of California moderator, and appeared as the presiding judge on an unscripted, prime-time court show on FOX; You the Jury.

== Awards ==
Cordell has received 43 awards and honors, including:

- the Chief Justice Earl Warren Civil Liberties Award from the ACLU of Northern California;
- the Crystal Gavel Award from the California Association of Black Lawyers’ Judicial Section;
- induction into Stanford University’s Multicultural Hall of Fame, and
- the Silicon Valley Black Legends Hall of Fame, (Law & Justice Award).
