= Dave Pine =

American politician (born 1958)

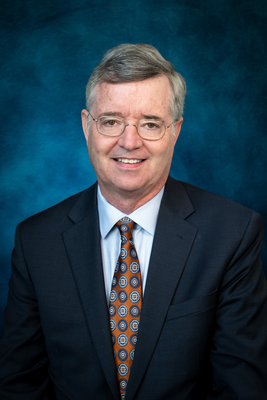

President of the San Mateo County Board of Supervisors
- In office January 3, 2023 – January 9, 2024
- Preceded by: Don Horsley
- Succeeded by: Warren Slocum
- In office January 9, 2018 – January 8, 2019
- Preceded by: Don Horsley
- Succeeded by: Carole Groom
- In office January 7, 2014 – January 6, 2015
- Preceded by: Don Horsley
- Succeeded by: Carole Groom

Member of the San Mateo County Board of Supervisors from the 1st district
- In office May 24, 2011 – January 7, 2025
- Preceded by: Mark Church
- Succeeded by: Jackie Speier

Member of the New Hampshire House of Representatives
- In office 1977–1979

Personal details
- Born: December 22, 1958 (age 67) Massachusetts
- Party: Democratic
- Spouse: Jane Pine
- Children: 2
- Education: Dartmouth College (BA); University of Michigan (JD)
- Website: www.davepine.com

Dave Pine (born 1958) is an American politician and attorney. Pine was formerly a member of the San Mateo County Board of Supervisors for District 1, which includes the eastern two-thirds of South San Francisco and all of San Bruno, Millbrae, Burlingame, and Hillsborough.

== Early life and education ==
Dave Pine was born in Massachusetts and grew up in New Hampshire, where his father worked as a professor and his mother was a teacher. He has two siblings.

While a freshman at Dartmouth College, Pine ran for and won a seat in the New Hampshire House of Representatives and at age 19, was one of the youngest ever elected. Pine served in the house from 1977 to 1979. After Dartmouth, Pine attended the University of Michigan Law School. He was a summer intern at Fenwick & West in Palo Alto (now located in Mountain View). After graduating in 1985, Pine accepted a position at a corporate law firm, representing Silicon Valley start-up tech companies.

== Career ==
=== Silicon Valley ===
Pine left Fenwick & West in 1990 to join a tech start-up called Radius, Inc, and later worked for the tech start-up @Home Network.

=== Politics ===
==== 2002 California State Assembly election ====
In 2002, Pine ran for the California's 19th State Assembly district, and poured more than $762,000 of his own money into his campaign. Pine called for campaign finance reforms including public campaign financing and for campaign donations under $1000 to be tax-deductible. His campaign was mostly self-financed. Pine criticized opponent Gina Papan for accepting a $365,000 campaign contribution from her father Lou Papan. Despite outspending each of his opponents, Pine finished a distant 3rd place with just 19% of the vote.

==== School boards ====
In 2003, Pine ran unopposed for a seat on the Burlingame School District Board of Trustees and served until 2006, when he was board president. In 2007, Pine was elected to the San Mateo Union High School District Board of Trustees.

=== 2011 San Mateo County Board of Supervisors ===
Pine won the May 3, 2011 all-mail-ballot special election for the District 1 seat on the San Mateo County Board of Supervisors. Before the election date had even been set, Pine and opponents Richard Holober, Terry Nagel, and Gina Papan had already declared their candidacy. Demetrios Nikas and Michael Stogner later entered the race. Final election results were certified by the San Mateo County Elections Office on May 9, 2011. Out of a total of 88,903 votes cast, Pine received 23,856 (27.8%)

San Mateo County Supervisor District 1, May 3, 2011
Candidate	Votes	%
Dave Pine	23,856	27.8%
Richard Holober	22,299	25.1%
Gina Papan	21,796	24.5%
Terry Nagel	8,683	9.8%
Michael Stogner	6,269	7.1%
Demetrios Nikas	2,870	3.2%

Pine was re-elected in 2012, 2016, and 2020.

Pine left office on January 7, 2025, succeeded by Jackie Speier.
