= San Mateo-Foster City School District =

School district in California

Address
- 1170 Chess Dr; Foster City, California Foster City, San Mateo County, California, 94404
- Coordinates: 37°33′N 122°18.5′W

District information
- Type: Public
- Motto: Live, Lead, Learn
- Grades: K (TK) – 8
- President: Audrey Ng
- Vice-president: Shara Watkins
- Superintendent: Diego R. Ochoa
- Schools: 20
- NCES District ID: 0634920

Students and staff
- Students: 10,357 (2022-23)
- Teachers: 1,172
- Staff: 413

Other information
- Website: smfcsd.net

San Mateo-Foster City School District is a school district in San Mateo and Foster City, California. It consists of twenty schools: three middle schools (Grades 6–8), fourteen elementary schools (TK/K–5), and three schools with all grades (K–8). With a total enrollment of approximately 12,500 students (in 2015–16), it is the largest school district in San Mateo County. Students in the San Mateo-Foster City School District continue on to the San Mateo Union High School District.

== History ==
San Mateo-Foster City School District locations
1 Abbott
2 Audubon
3 Baywood
4 Bayside
5 Beresford
6 Borel
7 Bowditch
8 Brewer Island
9 Charter Square
10 College Park
11 District Office
12 Fiesta Gardens
13 Foster City
14 George Hall
15 Highlands
16 Knolls
17 Laurel
18 LEAD
19 Meadow Heights
20 North Shoreview
21 Parkside
22 San Mateo Park
23 Sunnybrae

=== Measure L ===
Measure L was passed in February 2008, and provided funds to modernize and repair schools in the district.

=== Measure P ===
Measure P was placed on the November 2013 ballot, but failed to pass. Measure P would have funded capital programs to add a fifth grade to Bowditch Middle School and reopen Knolls Elementary, but debates on Measure P exposed a rift between Foster City and San Mateo residents who felt that Measure P provided disproportionate benefits to the smaller Foster City. Final voting showed support for Measure P in Foster City was outweighed by opposition in San Mateo.

=== Measure X ===
Measure X was passed in November 2015, and committed to:

Phase I
- Building a new elementary school in Foster City (Charter Square site)
- Building new classrooms and gyms at Abbott and Borel Middle Schools
- Building a new gym at Bayside Academy
Phase II (planning to start in 2019)
- Building new classrooms and replacing administration building at Bowditch Middle School
- Building new classrooms and new multipurpose rooms to George Hall and Sunnybrae
- Building a new neighborhood elementary school at College Park

The school at Charter Square is anticipated to be completed in early 2019 at an estimated (in 2016) cost of US$61,000,000 (equivalent to $81,830,000 in 2025). After Measure P failed to pass, Measure X was written with input from an eight-member committee which held nearly 100 public meetings from 2014 to 2015 to come up with recommendations to increase district capacity while maintaining equal opportunities for all students. Rather than reopen Knolls Elementary, Measure X included the creation of a new elementary school at College Park, drawing students from the surrounding North Central neighborhood. The current elementary school at College Park, which had served neighborhood children prior to its conversion to a Mandarin-language immersion school, had a history of poor academic performance.

In November 2018, the District announced that due to the rising cost of construction, the elementary school at Charter Square would not be built, but acquisition of the land from developer Westlake Urban, who had previously operated a shopping mall at the site, would continue. The final cost of the acquisition and the construction was estimated to exceed the total project $61 M budget by $11 M. The final cost of land acquisition is anticipated to be $30.1 M.

=== Measure Y ===
Measure Y, proposing an extension of an existing parcel tax which generated $7 million annually, failed to reach the two-thirds supermajority required to pass in an all-mail ballot held in March 2017.

=== Measure V ===
Measure V, proposing a parcel tax of approximately $298 per property to generate a projected $10 million annually, passed with 67.9% of the vote, just over the required two-thirds majority of those voting in the November 2018 election.

== Schools ==
List of San Mateo-Foster City School District Schools
Name	Type	Grades	Address	City	Special Curriculum	Image
Abbott (Note: California Distinguished School)	Middle	6–8	600 W. 36th Avenue	San Mateo	Spanish-English Immersion & Global Studies Program (Note: Continuation from Fiesta Gardens)	
Audubon	Elementary	TK–5	841 Gull Avenue	Foster City		
Bayside Academy	Elementary/Middle	K–5, 6–8	2025 Kehoe Avenue	San Mateo	STEAM (K–5); STEM (6–8) (Note: Science, Technology, Engineering (Arts) & Mathematics); Mandarin Immersion (Note: At the middle school level, as a continuation from College Park)	
Baywood	Elementary	TK–5	600 Alameda de las Pulgas	San Mateo		
Beach Park	Elementary	K–5	1058 Shell Blvd.	Foster City		
Beresford	Elementary	K–5	300 W. 28th Avenue	San Mateo		
Borel	Middle	6–8	425 Barneson Avenue	San Mateo		
Bowditch	Middle	6–8	1450 Tarpon Street	Foster City		
Brewer Island	Elementary	TK–5	1151 Polynesia Drive	Foster City		
College Park	Elementary	K–5	1001 Bermuda Drive	San Mateo	Mandarin Immersion	
Fiesta Gardens	Elementary	K–5	715A Indian Avenue	San Mateo	Spanish-English Immersion	
Foster City	Elementary	TK–5	461 Beach Park Boulevard	Foster City		
George Hall	Elementary	TK–5	130 San Miguel Way	San Mateo		
Highlands	Elementary	TK–5	2320 Newport Street	San Mateo		
Laurel	Elementary	TK–5	316 W. 36th Avenue	San Mateo		
LEAD (Note: Formerly known as Horrall. LEAD stands for Literacy, Enrichment, Academics & Digital Arts)	Elementary	TK–5	949 Ocean View Avenue	San Mateo		
Meadow Heights	Elementary	TK–5	2619 Dolores Street	San Mateo		
North Shoreview	Elementary/Middle	K–8	1301 Cypress Street	San Mateo	Montessori	
Parkside	Elementary/Middle	K–8	1685 Eisenhower Street	San Mateo	Montessori	
San Mateo Park	Elementary	TK–5	161 Clark Drive	San Mateo		
Sunnybrae	Elementary	TK–5	1031 S. Delaware Street	San Mateo	International Baccalaureate	

=== Bowditch Middle ===
One of the schools is Bowditch Middle School. It has 6th, 7th, and 8th graders. Bowditch was named after Nathaniel Bowditch and consists of more than 1,000 students. There is a principal, and two assistant principals. Bowditch is a big school, with more than 40 classrooms. They are more commonly known as the Buccaneers, and have an orchestra, band, soccer, flag football, track and more.

=== Knolls Elementary ===
Knolls Elementary, at 525 42nd Avenue in San Mateo, is on the southern edge of the district. It was closed in 1989, but reopened temporarily in 2011 after refurbishment and modernization using Measure L funds to temporarily house Fiesta Gardens students while that site was undergoing renovations, which were completed in 2013.

=== Bayside Academy ===
Bayside, at 2025 Kehoe Ave in San Mateo, is a K-8 school. It hosts the Mandarin Immersion and GATE (Gifted And Talented Education) for middle school. It also has a new gym built recently.

== Demographics ==
San Mateo-Foster City School District Enrollment
Year	Total	African American	American Indian or Alaska Native	Asian	Filipino	Hispanic or Latino	Pacific Islander	White	Two or More Races	Not Reported	Male	Female
2017–18	11837	110	13	2940	431	4124	254	2941	979	45	6141	5696
2016–17	11970	132	12	2951	447	4097	279	3091	913	48	6185	5785
2015–16	11977	148	13	2918	506	4094	287	3110	867	34	6119	5858
2014–15	11858	164	17	2754	519	4093	307	3159	825	20	6061	5797
