= Robert Foucrault =

American coroner

Robert Foucrault is the coroner for San Mateo County, California. He joined the coroner's office in 1992 and was promoted to Chief Deputy Coroner in 1998. As deputy coroner, he assumed the duties when coroner Adrian "Bud" Moorman died on April 10, 2001, and was appointed to the coroner's office on June 4, 2002.

== Biography ==
Robert Foucrault was born in 1962 or 1963.

Foucrault began working for the San Mateo County Coroner's Office in 1992 as an investigator. By June 1998, Foucrault had become the chief deputy coroner of San Mateo County, California.

In 2000, Foucrault began running the coroner's office after Adrian Moorman became ill; Moorman died in April 2001. Foucrault was elected for the position in 2002. In January 2007, Jerry Hill, the president of the San Mateo County Board of Supervisors, sent a letter to Foucrault condemning lewd conduct in his office. In October, a woman sued Foucrault for allegedly keeping her son's heart. Foucrault faced a challenge from Stacie Nevares, his former assistant, in the 2010 election. His tenure included handling the San Bruno pipeline explosion, a limousine fire on the San Mateo–Hayward Bridge, and Asiana Airlines Flight 214.
