= Jan Yanehiro =

Japanese-American broadcast journalist

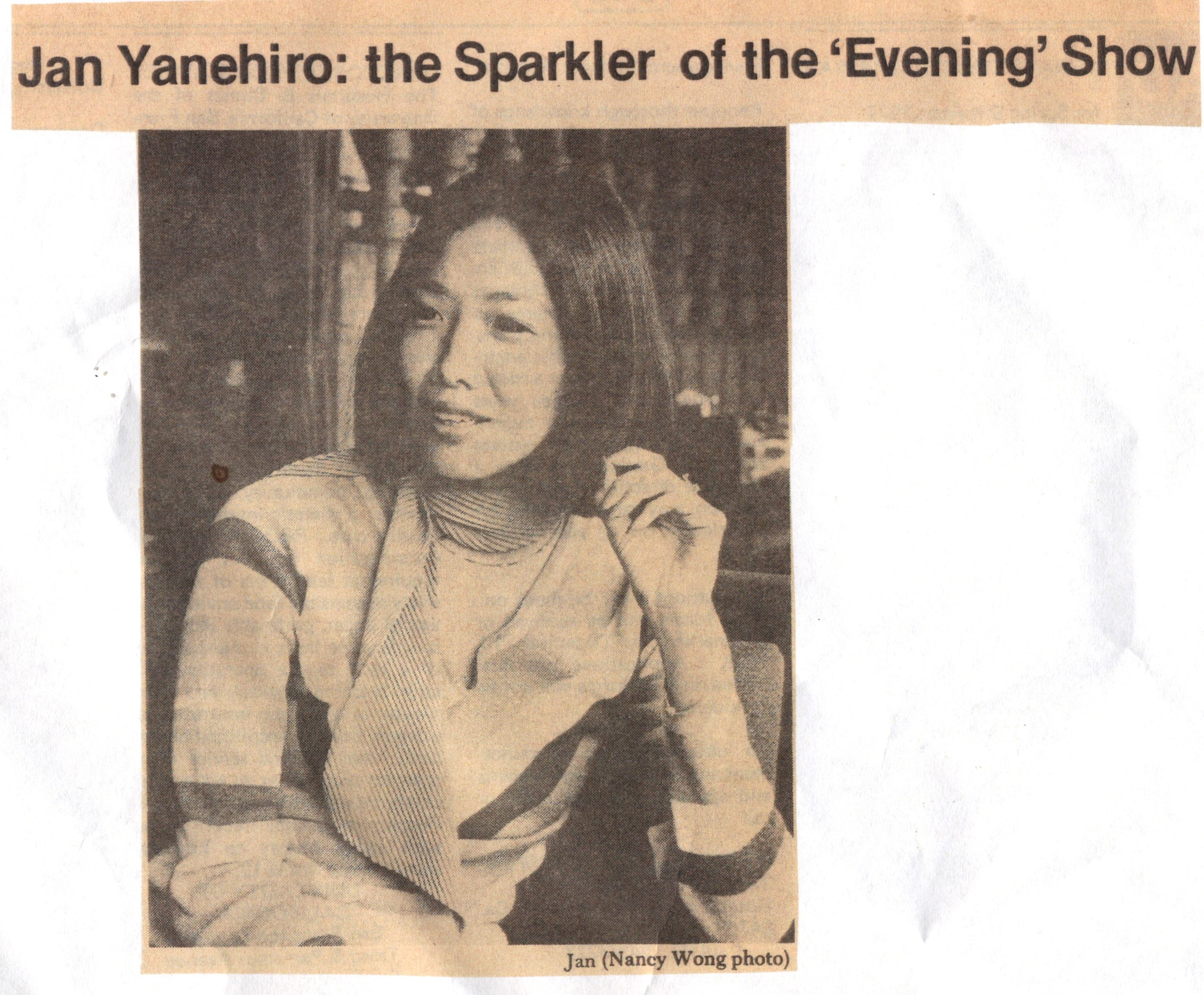
Yanehiro in 1976

Jan Yanehiro is a Japanese-American broadcast journalist.

== Personal life ==
Yanehiro earned a bachelor's degree in journalism from California State University, Fresno in 1970. She first worked as a flight attendant before getting a job on radio station KFRC (defunct) in San Francisco. Yanehiro is among the first native-born Asian-American female journalists.

Yanehiro had three children with her late husband John Zimmerman.

She became Director of the School of Communications & Media Technologies at Academy of Art University in San Francisco in 2008. She continues to host charity events and travels the world giving lectures.

== Radio and Television career ==
Yanehiro started her career in radio at KFRC (defunct). In 1975, she was hired by KPIX-TV to help develop and co-host a new, groundbreaking half-hour non-news magazine series. Initially called "Evening Show: MTWTF", Evening Magazine debuted August 9, 1976. Owing to its success it was franchised to television markets across the United States, who produced their own versions, primarily known as PM Magazine.

Yanehiro remained with the original Evening Magazine throughout its 14-year run, 1976–1990. From 1998 to 2001, she co-hosted HGTV's "Appraise It!" for its 5-season run.

Over the years Yanehiro has hosted and produced documentaries for KVIE and KCSM-TV. She has also hosted a series on radio station KCBS.

Yanehiro served as the narrator of the 1996 documentary "Starting Over: Japanese Americans After the War" about the aftermath of the Internment of Japanese Americans during WWII.

== Other business and community activities ==
She is the president of production company Jan Yanehiro, Inc., a partner of Fair Advantage, a director of Bank of Marin, a board member on Kristi Yamaguchi's Always Dream Foundation, a board member of the Center for the Pacific Rim at the University of San Francisco, and a board member of the National Board of Visitors at California State University, Fresno.

Yanehiro is also a member of the Asian American Journalists Association, the National Academy of Television Arts and Sciences, and has previously served on the board of directors of the US-Japan Council and is a member of the organization's Legacy Council.

== Achievements ==
She has received several Emmys for her work, received the Eleanor Roosevelt Humanitarian Award from the United Nations of San Francisco, was inducted into the Academy of Television and Radio Hall of Fame in New York City, and became a Silver Circle Inductee of the National Academy of Television Arts and Sciences in 2003. She was also recognized as a Woman of Distinction by the Girl Scouts of the United States of America, and honored as an Outstanding Alumnus by California State University, Fresno.

She received an honorary doctorate from the Academy of Art University in May 2018.

== Books (as co-author) ==
- Having a Baby (1984)
- After Having a Baby (1988)
- This Is Not The Life I Ordered (2007)
