= San Mateo County Board of Supervisors =

Type
- Type: Unicameral
- Term limits: 3 terms (12 years)

Leadership
- President: Noelia Corzo since 2026
- Vice President: Ray Mueller since 2026
- Supervisor, First District: Jackie Speier since 2025
- Supervisor, Second District: Noelia Corzo since 2023
- Supervisor, Third District: Ray Mueller since 2023
- Supervisor, Fourth District: Lisa Gauthier since 2025
- Supervisor, Fifth District: David Canepa since 2017

Structure
- Seats: 5
- Political groups: Officially nonpartisan: Democratic (5)
- Length of term: 4 years, three term limit

Elections
- Voting system: Two-round system
- Last election: November 5, 2024
- Next election: TBD

Website
- https://www.smcgov.org/bos

The San Mateo County Board of Supervisors is the five-member elected body that supervises the operation of San Mateo County, California. Board members represent one of five districts of roughly equal population within the county, elected, since a 2012 charter change, only by voters in their own district. The current board members are Jackie Speier (District 1), Noelia Corzo (District 2), Ray Mueller (District 3), Lisa Gauthier (District 4), and David Canepa (District 5).

== Election results ==
=== 2010 ===
District 2 Election, June 8, 2010
Candidate	Votes	%
Carole Groom	71,549	75.4
Daniel Kaul	23,381	24.6
Total votes	94,930	100.0
Turnout	{{{votes}}}	23.7%

District 3 Election, June 8, 2010
Candidate	Votes	%
Don Horsley	40,568	39.1
April Vargas	24,534	23.6
John Hickey	16,699	16.1
Matt Grocott	15,269	14.7
Michael Stogner	6,731	6.5
Total votes	103,801	100.0
Turnout	{{{votes}}}	26.0%

District 3 Runoff Election, November 2, 2010
Candidate	Votes	%
Don Horsley	98,146	56.4
April Vargas	75,875	43.6
Total votes	174,021	100.0
Turnout	{{{votes}}}	50.2%

=== 2011 ===
An all-mail-ballot special election was held to fill the vacancy created when Supervisor Mark Church resigned to assume office as San Mateo County Chief Elections Officer & Assessor-County Clerk-Recorder on January 3, 2011. The six candidates were San Mateo Union High School District Board President Dave Pine, San Mateo County Community College District Board of Trustees President Richard Holober, Millbrae City Council member Gina Papan, Burlingame Mayor Terry Nagel, retired aerospace engineer Demetrios Nikas, and victim advocate Michael Stogner.

District 1 Special Election, May 3, 2011
Candidate	Votes	%
Dave Pine	23,856	26.8
Richard Holober	22,299	25.1
Gina Papan	21,796	24.5
Terry Nagel	8,683	9.8
Michael Stogner	6,269	7.1
Demetrios Nikas	2,870	3.2
Total votes	88,903	100.0
Turnout	{{{votes}}}	26.0%

=== 2012 ===
Warren Slocum replaced termed-out District 4 Supervisor Rose Jacobs Gibson in January 2013 in the last at-large vote for Supervisor due to the passage of Measure B, mandating supervisorial elections by voters of the same district.

District 4 Election, June 5, 2012
Candidate	Votes	%
Warren Slocum	37,542	38.4
Shelly Masur	20,989	21.4
Kirsten Keith	14,853	15.2
Carlos Romero	8,707	8.9
Memo Morantes	7,989	8.2
Andy Cohen	4,723	4.8
Ernesto "Ernie" Schmidt	3,085	3.2
Total votes	97,888	100.0
Turnout	{{{votes}}}	29.0%

District 4 Runoff Election, November 6, 2012
Candidate	Votes	%
Warren Slocum	131,015	54.7
Shelly Masur	108,373	45.3
Total votes	239,388	100.0
Turnout	{{{votes}}}	66.2%

=== 2022 ===
Both District 2 Supervisor Carole Groom and District 3 Supervisor Don Horsley were termed out. San Mateo-Foster City School District Trustee Noelia Corzo beat Belmont City Councilmember Charles Stone to replace Groom and Menlo Park City Councilmember Ray Mueller beat San Carlos City Councilmember Laura Parmer-Lohan to replace Horsley.

District 2 Election, June 7, 2022
Candidate	Votes	%
Charles Stone	13,470	45.84%
Noelia Corzo	12,635	43.00%
Cameron Rolfe	3,282	11.17%
Total votes	35,195	100.0
Turnout	{{{votes}}}	40.36%

District 3 Election, June 7, 2022
Candidate	Votes	%
Ray Mueller	13,888	34.45%
Laura Parmer-Lohan	12,778	31.70%
Virginia Chang Kiraly	7,986	19.81%
Steven Booker	5,659	14.04%
Total votes	47,048	100.0
Turnout	{{{votes}}}	45.11%

District 2 Runoff Election, November 8, 2022
Candidate	Votes	%
Noelia Corzo	22,246	51.74%
Charles Stone	20,747	48.26%
Total votes	53,211	100.0
Turnout	{{{votes}}}	61.23%

District 3 Runoff Election, November 8, 2022
Candidate	Votes	%
Ray Mueller	35,887	62.22%
Laura Parmer-Lohan	21,790	37.78%
Total votes	70,514	100.0
Turnout	{{{votes}}}	67.79%

=== 2024 ===
District 5 Supervisor David Canepa is up for reelection to his third term and both District 1 Supervisor Dave Pine and District 4 Supervisor Warren Slocum are term limited.

==== District 1 ====
The incumbent is Dave Pine, who has represented the district since 2011 and was re-elected in 2020. He is term limited in 2024.

===== Candidates =====
====== Declared ======
- Jackie Speier, former U.S. Representative from California's 14th congressional district (2008-2023), former member of the California State Senate (1998- 2006), former member of the California State Assembly (1986-1996), former member of the San Mateo County Board of Supervisors (1980-1986)

====== Withdrew ======
- Emily Beach, Burlingame city councilmember
- Gina Papan, Millbrae city councilmember

====== Potential ======
- James Coleman, South San Francisco city councilmember
- Anders Fung, Millbrae city councilmember
- Maurice Goodman, Millbrae city councilmember
- Linda Mason, former San Bruno city councilmember
- Rico Medina, San Bruno mayor
- Ricardo Ortiz, Burlingame city councilmember

====== Declined ======
- Irving Torres, housing advocate

==== District 4 ====
The incumbent is Warren Slocum, who has represented the district since 2013 and was re-elected in 2020.

===== Candidates =====
====== Declared ======
- Lisa Gauthier, East Palo Alto city councilmember

====== Potential ======
- Ian Bain, former Redwood City city councilmember
- Paul Bocanegra, juvenile justice advocate
- Drew Combs, Menlo Park city councilmember
- Antonio Lopez, East Palo Alto city councilmember
- Shelly Masur, former Redwood City city councilmember and candidate for state senate in 2020
- Cecilia Taylor, Menlo Park city councilmember

====== Declined ======
- Alicia Aguirre, Redwood City city councilmember
- Giselle Hale, former Redwood City city councilmember

==== District 5 ====
The incumbent is David Canepa, who has represented the district since 2017 and was re-elected in 2020.

===== Candidates =====
====== Declared ======
- David Canepa, incumbent Supervisor
