= NCFC =

The abbreviation NCFC may refer to:

== Association football clubs ==
- Nairn County F.C.
- Nanjing City F.C.
- Newport County A.F.C.
- Newry City A.F.C.
- Newry City F.C.
- North Carolina FC
- North Carolina FC Youth (NCFC Youth)
- Norwich City F.C.
- Notts County F.C.

== Athletic Conferences ==
- Northern California Football Conference (NCFC)

== Other uses ==
- Neuro-cardio-facial-cutaneous syndromes

== See also ==
- NCAFC (disambiguation)
