= Coyote Point Recreation Area =

Park in San Mateo County, California, US

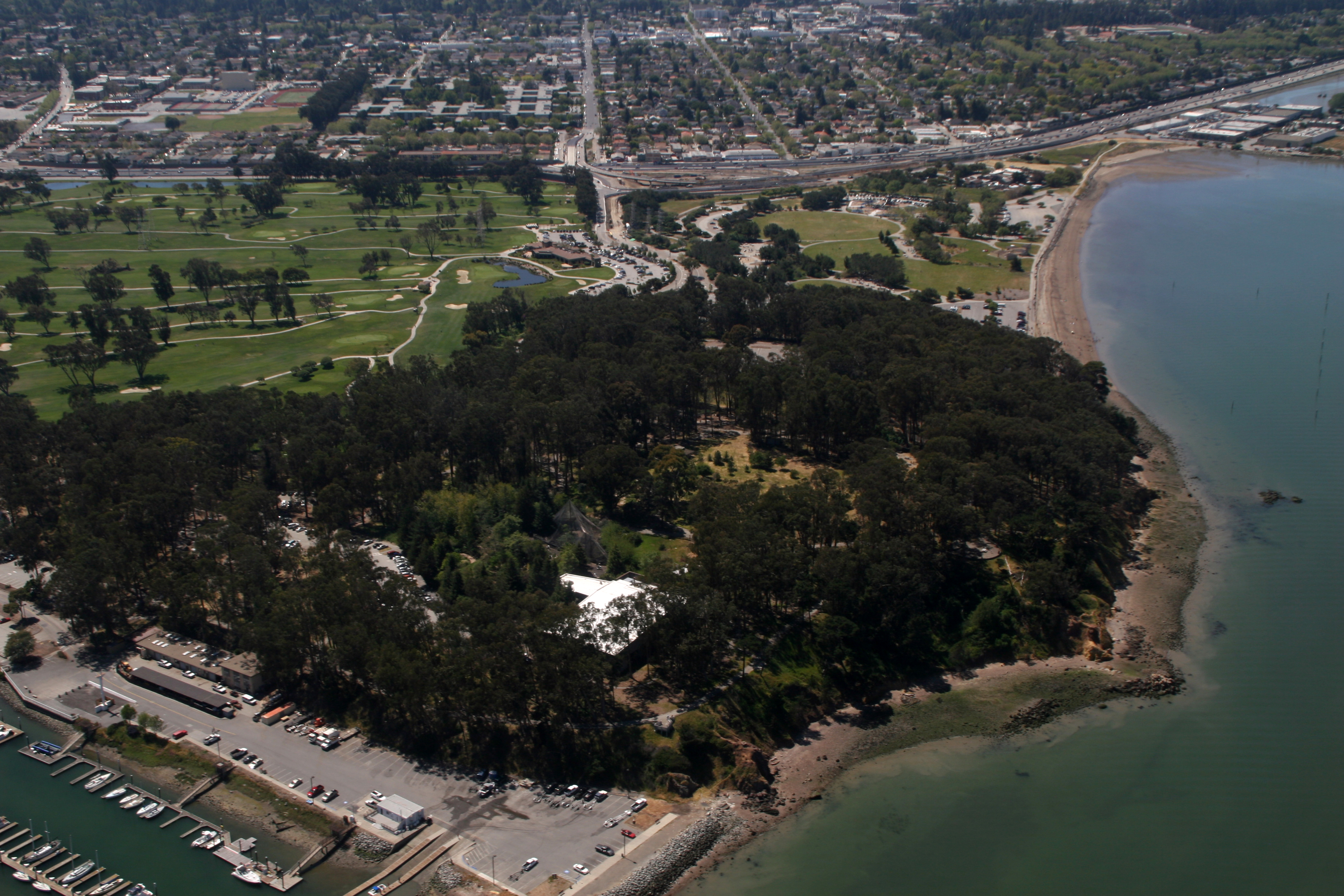
- Coyote Point from the air. Peninsula Avenue retreats into the center background after crossing the Bayshore Freeway (US 101), which runs from left to right in the upper portion of the picture. The marina, at lower left, runs almost directly north-south. Beyond the trees, in the upper left, is the adjoining Poplar Creek Golf Course.

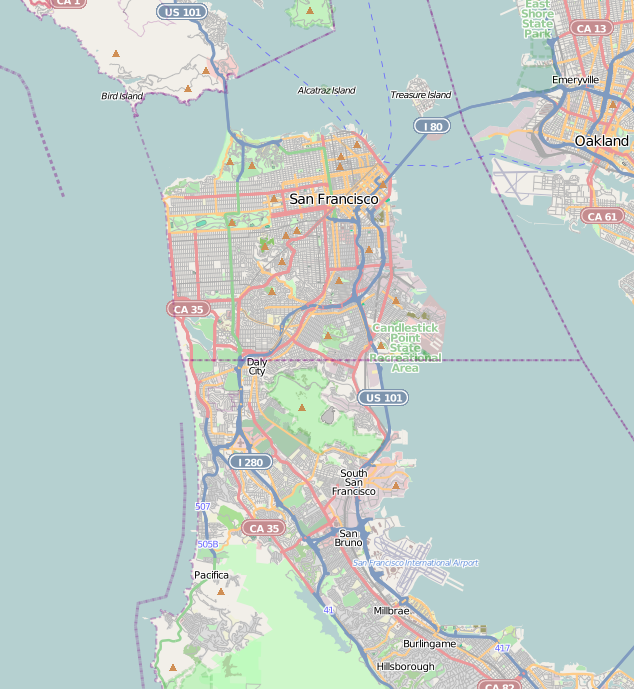
- Location within San Francisco Location within San Francisco Bay Area Location within California
- Type: Parkland, woodland, museum & zoo
- Location: San Mateo County, California, USA
- Coordinates: 37.5893796°N 122.3260810°W
- Area: 670 acres (270 ha)
- Created: 1962
- Operator: San Mateo County, California
- Open: All year

Coyote Point Recreation Area is a 670-acre (270 ha) park operated by San Mateo County, California in the United States. Located on San Francisco Bay, it is south of San Francisco International Airport on the border of Burlingame and San Mateo. Facilities within the park include a large playground, the CuriOdyssey junior museum, a sandy bathing beach, a marina and yacht club, hiking trails, and picnic areas. In addition, the San Mateo County Sheriff's office has a shooting range on-site for training of law enforcement. It is adjacent to the Peninsula Humane Society and the municipal Poplar Creek Golf Course.

The distinctive point, covered by a grove of eucalyptus trees, can be seen from airplanes approaching San Francisco International Airport and is a good location for aircraft spotting and birdwatching. The site has been used for the large Pacific City amusement park in the early 1920s, as the basic training facility for the Pacific branch of the United States Merchant Marine service during World War II, and as the campus for College of San Mateo during the decade that followed the war. The county completed its acquisition of the park lands in 1962.

== History ==
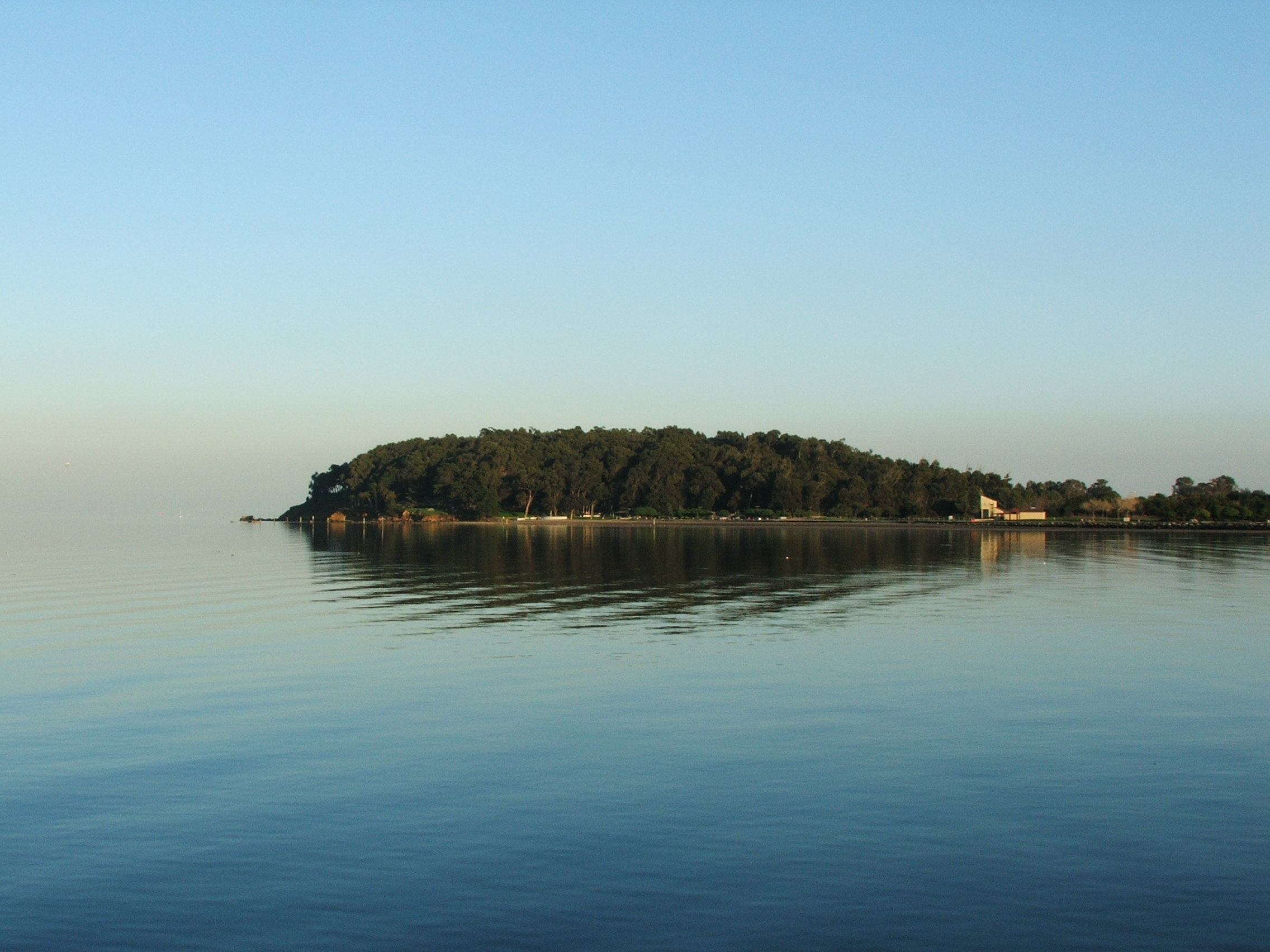
Coyote Point from the water

=== Precolumbian ===
Coyote Point was originally an island in San Francisco Bay rising to a height of 80 ft (24 m) above mean sea level with a marsh connecting it to the mainland. Because it has no fresh water, it is doubtful that Native Americans lived here, but shell mounds on the point indicate that it was at least occasionally used, possibly for special ceremonies or feasts; skeletal human remains were discovered in 1987 during routine dredging of the marina and dated to be approximately 4,000 years old, indicating a long presence of humans at the Point.

=== Spanish settlement ===
Coyote Point, is mentioned on maps before 1895 as San Mateo Point or San Matheo Point, was part of the Presidio and Mission lands until it passed to Mexico. The Governor of Mexico then granted the land, then known as Rancho San Mateo, to Cayetano Arenas, from whom the name can probably be traced. The Arenas family sold it to the firm of Mellus and Howard, and William Davis Merry Howard purchased it from the firm in 1850. After his death in 1856, the land passed to his brother George, who ordered a road and pier built on the land. At approximately the same time, Chinese immigrants established a fishing village near Coyote Point to harvest bay shrimp for San Francisco restaurants in the 1860s.

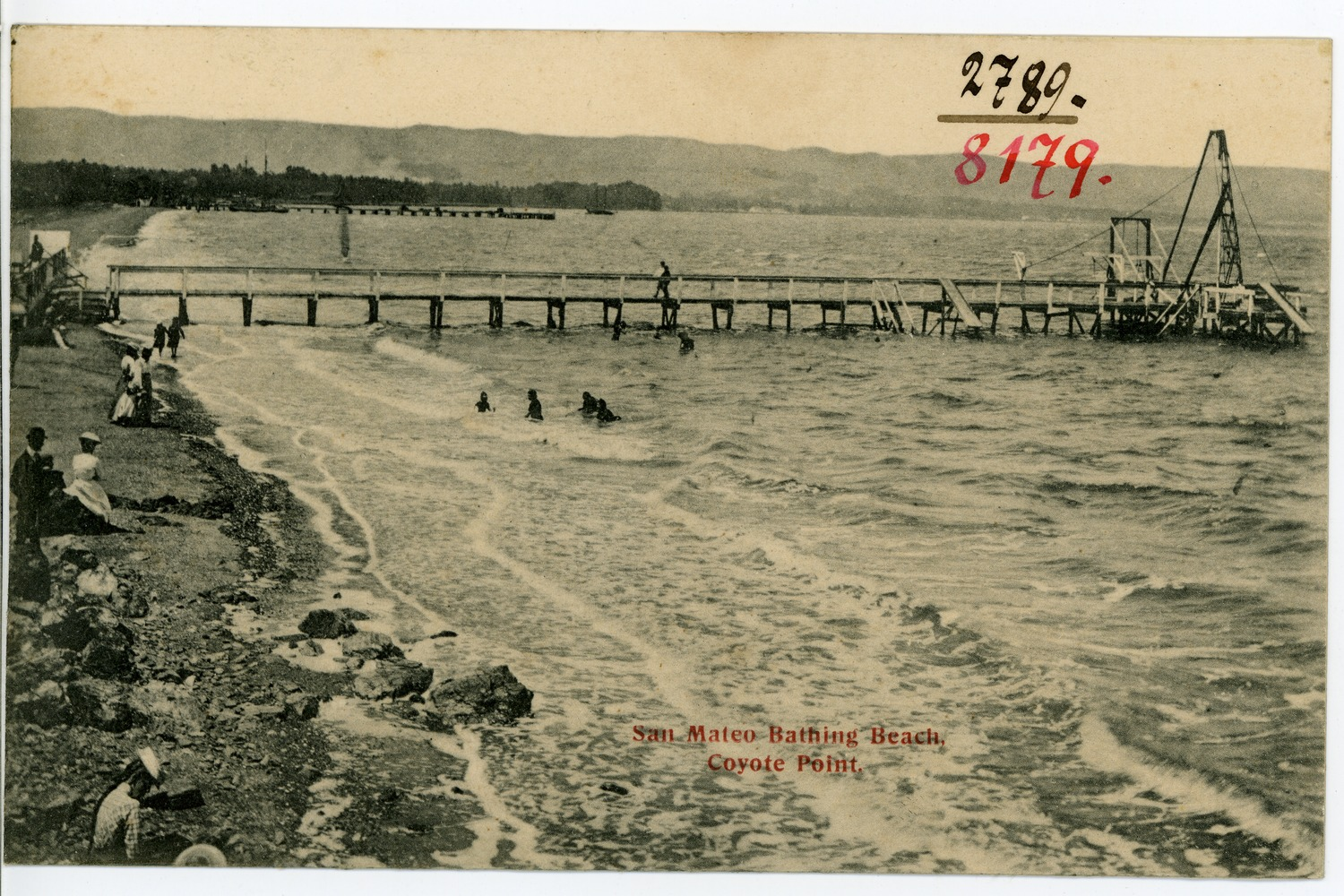
Coyote Point pier and bathing beach, view directed WSW towards Burlingame, 1906

By 1868, the pier at Coyote Point was operating for freight and lumber loading; it also served as a receiving point for sand that would be used in the construction of Crystal Springs Dam from 1888 to 1890. Under the Howard family, the marsh between the island and the mainland (now the Poplar Creek Golf Course) was reclaimed to create dairy pasture. They also built a bathhouse and pool on the beach in 1880, and had eucalyptus, cypress and pine trees planted on the knoll by noted horticulturist John McLaren between 1880 and 1882.

By 1890, the beach at Coyote Point near the pier was famed locally as the best in Burlingame and San Mateo, which made it the target of "sand pirates", who would truck away sand and sell it to artificial stone manufacturers in San Francisco. The land remained in the Howard family until it was sold to the county and the federal government in 1942.

=== Pacific City Amusement Park ===
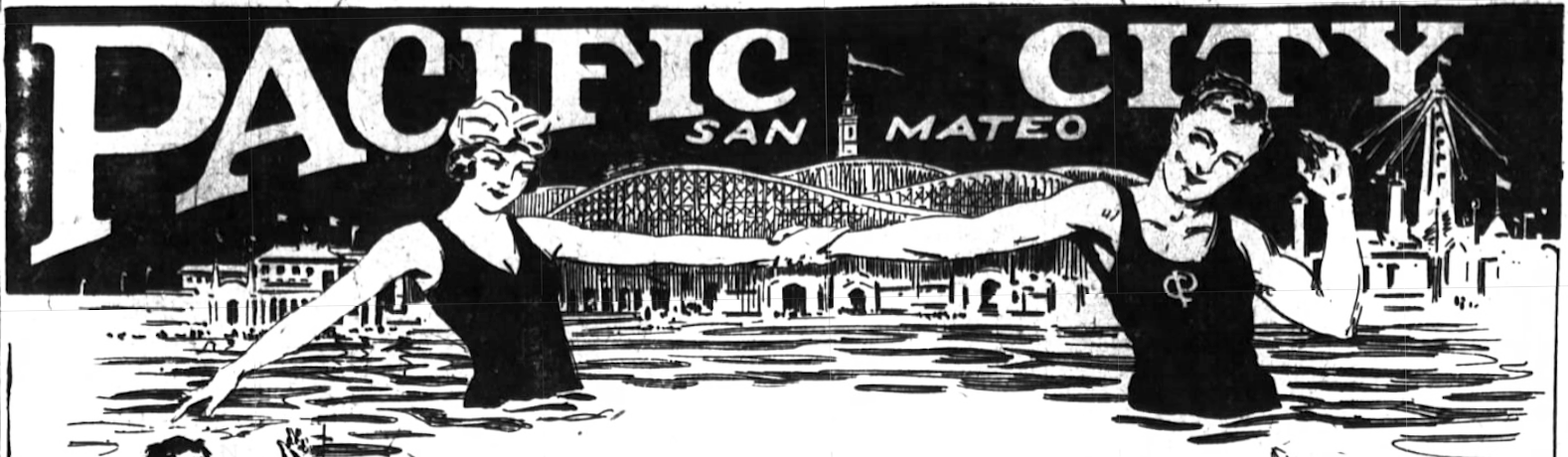
Advertising banner for the 1923 opening, published in the San Francisco Chronicle

On July 1, 1922, a group of promoters opened the "Pacific City Amusement Park", which occupied approximately 90 acres (36 ha) along the beach leased from the Howard family. Dubbed the "Coney Island of the West", the park included a beach (with trucked-in sand), boardwalk, children's playground, scenic railway, merry-go-round, Ferris wheel, dancing pavilion, and several food concessions. A crowd estimated at more than 100,000 people visited Pacific City on July 4 of that year, drawing comparisons to Atlantic City.

Although it was reputed to have had one million visitors in aggregate over the first season (1922), a fire during the second season destroyed about one quarter of the development, and it opened only briefly for a third season. The reasons given for the closure were strong afternoon winds and sewage contamination in the bay.

==== Genesis ====
The name and site were first proposed in September 1921 at San Mateo City Hall by Nat Messer, a San Francisco real estate dealer who pitched the idea to the Three Cities Chamber of Commerce (3CCC). The Pacific City Corporation (PCC), which developed the site, was led by a three-member board of directors composed of A.H. Dougall, Jr.; Arnold C. Lackenbach; and David J. Stollery. Stollery was serving as the secretary for PCC's largest creditor, the William H. Howard Estate Company. PCC was supported by the 3CCC, led by manager Daniel C. Imboden for the cities of San Mateo, Burlingame, and Hillsborough; 3CCC had been organized in 1921 with one of its stated priorities to be "the development of the San Mateo Beach" and was satisfied "that the building of Pacific City would well repay the membership of the Chamber for the money and time expended." At the time, the planned opening date was May 30, 1922, Decoration Day.

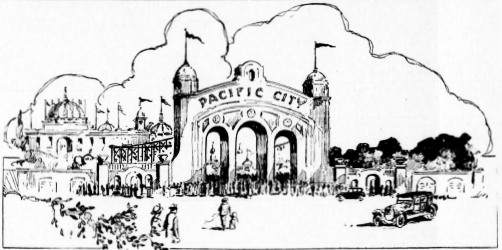
"Sixty-foot Ornate Structure at San Mateo's New Beach Resort Through Which Thousands Will Enter in Search of Pleasure."

The land was acquired for US$200,000 (equivalent to $3,850,000 in 2025) from the William H. Howard Estate Company in February 1922; at the time, it was the largest real estate transaction in San Mateo County. The site of Pacific City stretched for 3,000 ft (910 m) north from Coyote Point, including 90 acres (36 ha) of land and 250 acres (100 ha) covered by water. The Pacific City Corporation bragged in April 1922 that an investment of US$473,000 (equivalent to $9,100,000 in 2025) in total had been made so far, including land, construction, and equipment.

By late May, it was clear the new park would not be open in time for the holiday, although the work was nearing completion, including a 60 ft-high (18 m) entry gate with an illuminated sign, which would be visible to cars traveling on the Bayshore Highway. D. Wooster Taylor resigned from his position as superintendent of the children's playground at Golden Gate Park (now the Koret Children's Quarter) to manage Pacific City. Opening day was set for Saturday, July 1; that last week of June, workers hurried to put the finishing touches on the new park.

==== Attractions ====
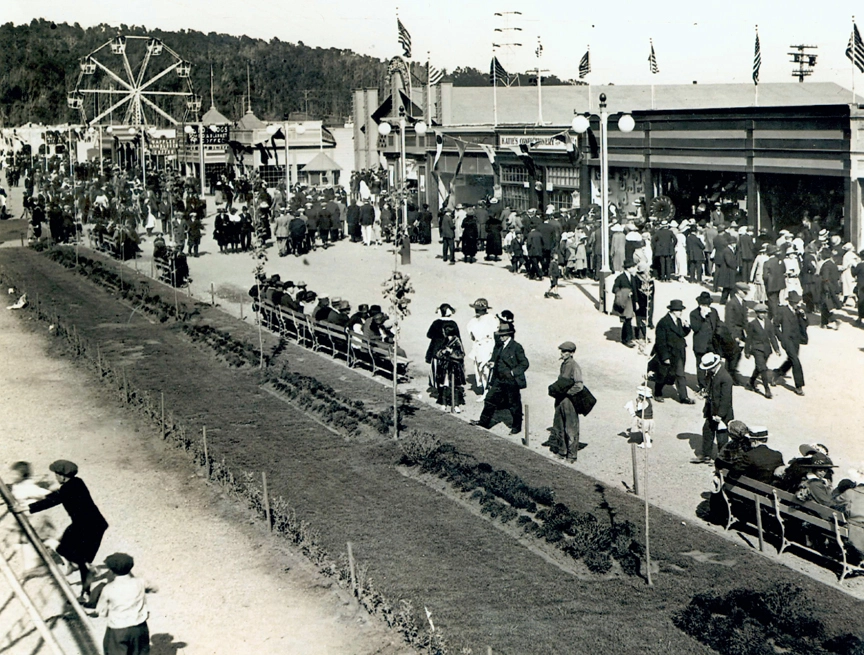
Pacific City boardwalk

Visitors to Pacific City rode the Southern Pacific Peninsula Commute trains to Burlingame, where Fageol shuttles would take them to the park for an additional 5 cents, the San Mateo Interurban, or the ferry from San Francisco, which tied up at the pier originally built by the Howard family, rebuilt and extended for Pacific City. The park was open daily until midnight. Parking for 5,000 automobiles was also provided.

Rides at Pacific City included The Whip, Dodg-em cars, a Dentzel menagerie carousel, a 22-inch narrow-gauge railway, a Ferris wheel, a shoot the chutes that ended with a splash in the Bay, and a "scenic railroad" (a wooden roller coaster designed by John A. Miller) called The Comet, which included an 80 ft (24 m) drop and was billed as the largest, fastest coaster west of Detroit. Ground was broken for Comet on April 21, 1922.

When not on rides, visitors could choose from bathing on the beach or dancing in a large wooden pavilion; hunger was satiated by concessionaires vending hot dogs and pigs-in-the-blanket. An old ferry, the Ocean Wave, was tied up to the pier to serve as a floating restaurant as well. In addition to regular live music performances, Harry Houdini entertained crowds during the first season with masterful escapes.

The opening weekend, which stretched through Independence Day, was a smashing success. More than 51,000 attended on Sunday, July 2 (estimates put the crowd at 60 to 75,000), and more than 100,000 attended on July 4. Daily attendance continued to exceed 20,000 on the weekends. Prominent citizens of Burlingame, Hillsborough, and San Mateo wrote a series of three newspaper articles, published two weeks later in mid-July, outlining their plans to take advantage of the publicity from Pacific City. 3CCC manager Imboden described plans to build temporary housing nearby. San Mateo mayor Thomas J. Brady wrote of that city's plans to acquire the Kohl estate, which would later become Central Park. By the time the season closed, more than one million had visited Pacific City.

==== Financial peril ====
The first signs of financial ill-health began in September 1922, when PCC was sued over the failure to pay back a small promisorry note. In December 1922, the Howard Estate filed suit to foreclose on the property over non-payment of a US$90,000 promissory note that had been signed by Dougall and Lackenbach; the first payment of $5,000, due the previous March 22, had not been made as scheduled and the only payment that had been received was $1,000 the preceding October. 3CCC brokered an agreement in which a three-member committee was appointed to investigate and report on the financial status of PCC in February 1923; 3CCC President John J. McGrath, who was one of the appointees, warned "that we will not stand for one local creditor or stockholder in Pacific City to lose a penny ... if they jockey and humbug, we are in position to make their investment worth about ten cents [on the dollar]." Lackenbach fired back days later: "... you have unwittingly placed the management of Pacific City in a very unfavorable light by reason of this article. It is not only unjust, but has absolutely no foundation. The management of Pacific City has at all times strenuously held that any reorganization or refinancing of Pacific City must first contemplate the payment of creditors in full with interest from the maturity of their claims."

Remnants of Pacific City

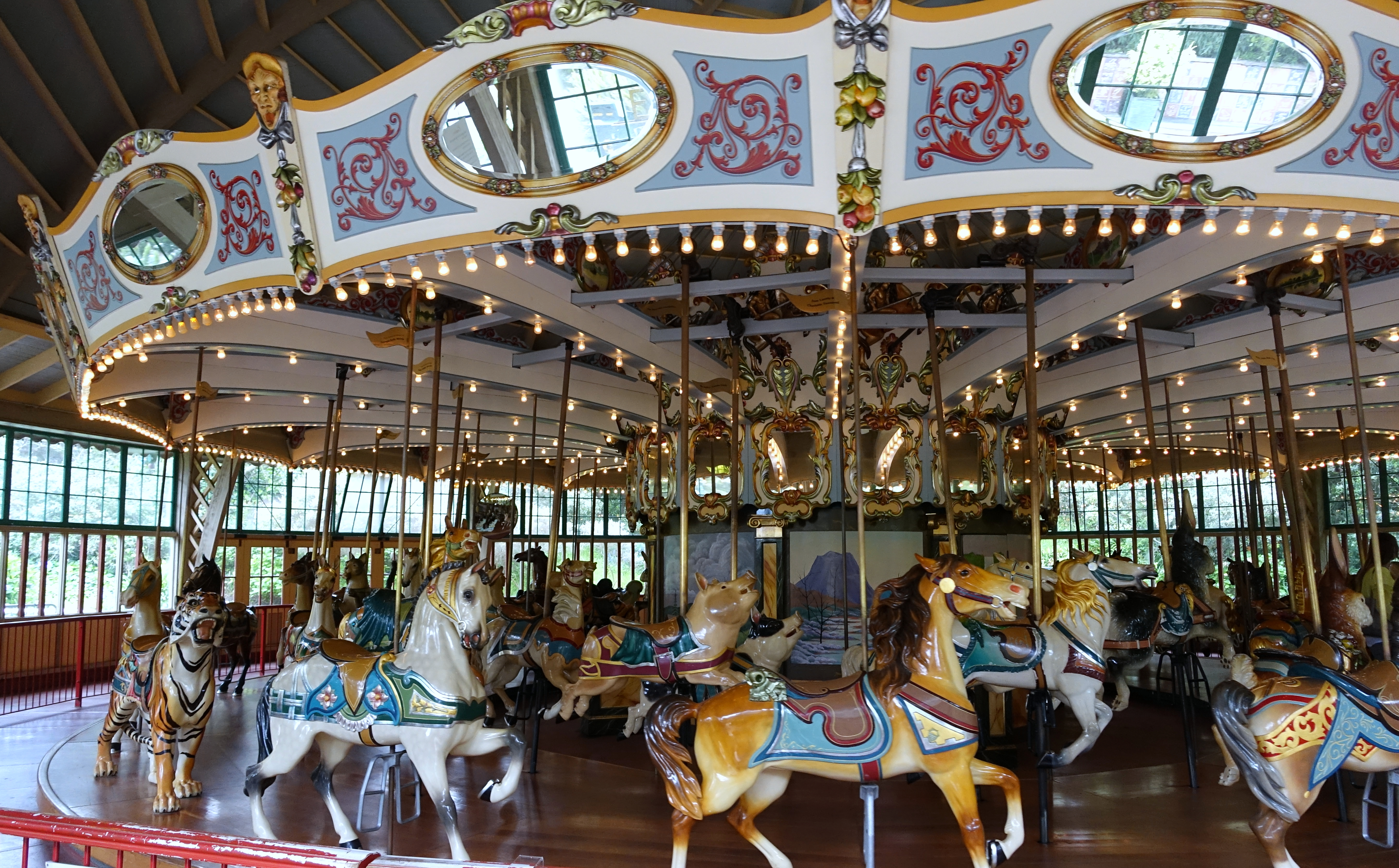
Dentzel carousel at the San Francisco Zoo (2015), originally built in 1921 for Pacific City

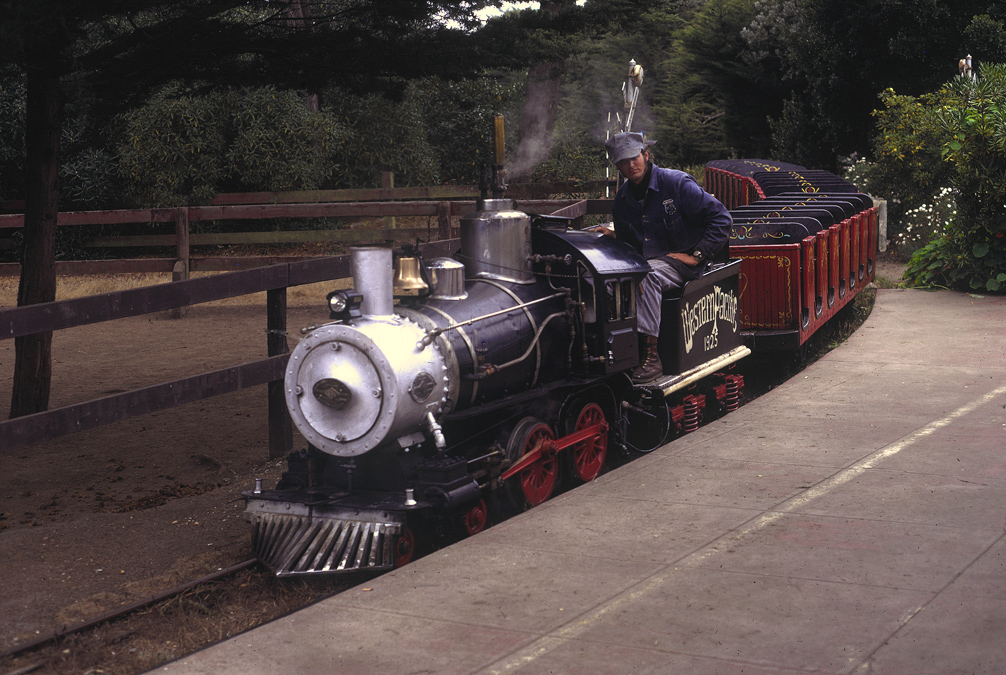
Little Puffer steam train at the SF Zoo (1971); the 4-4-0 locomotive was originally built c. 1904 by the Miniature Railway Company

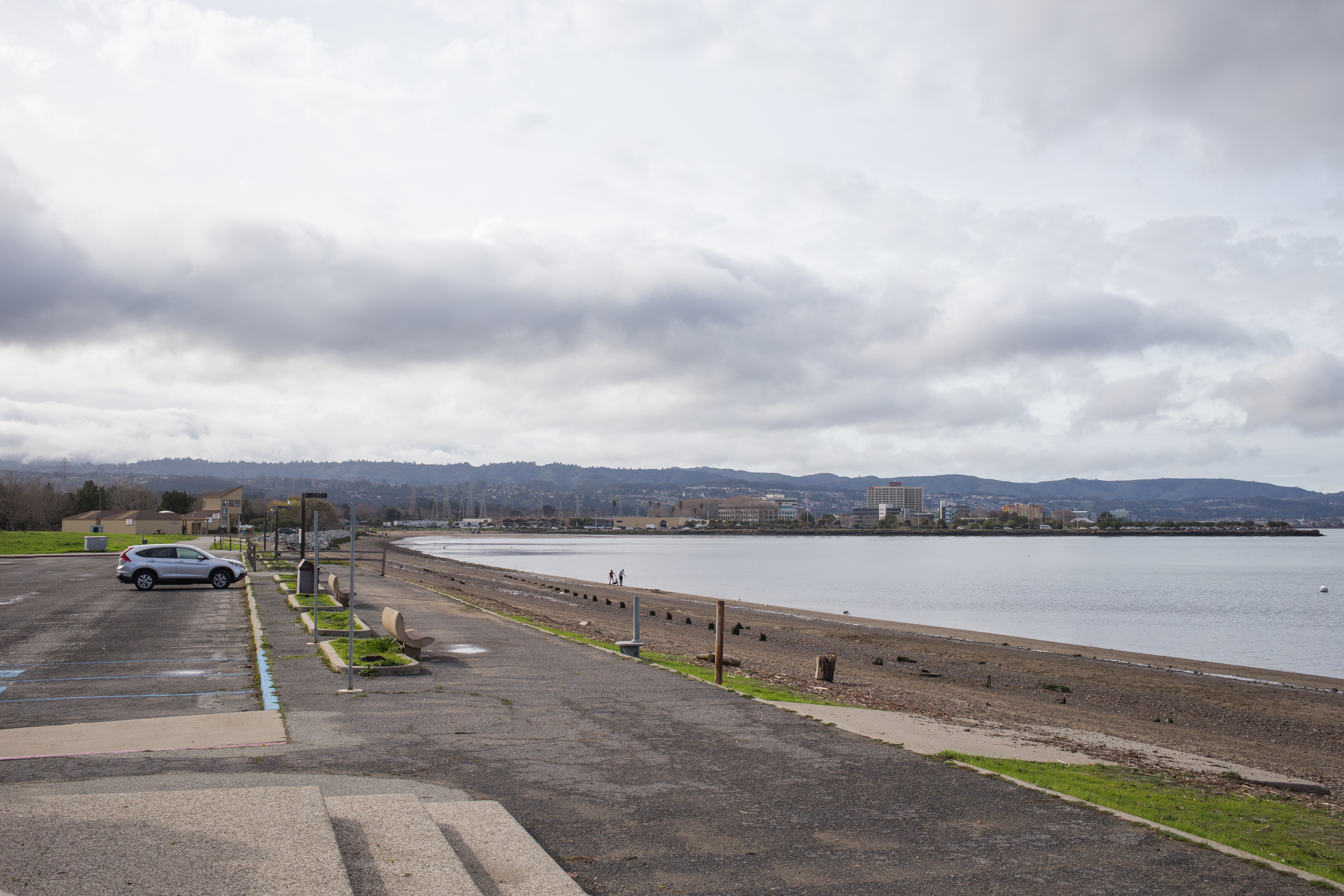
View of Coyote Point Promenade (2016); Pacific City boardwalk pier foundations were still embedded in the sandy beach.

To calm the situation, 3CCC stated they supported both the Howard Estate and PCCC, but if the foreclosure suit was successful, it would antagonize many investors, who likely would lose their stakes. The resort opened on May 19, 1923, due in part to the uncertainty about the resort's future. Despite the cold weather, approximately 135,000 visitors had been recorded by June 2. A fire destroyed "The Canyon", a restaurant, and the "Pig-in-the-Blanket" lunch stand on July 28, 1923. The fire, which started in the lunch stand, blazed out of control as low water pressure on-site and disconnected telephone lines hampered the initial response. Significant confusion regarding the proper jurisdiction also delayed the arrival of firefighters: a messenger was sent to the Burlingame fire department, which informed the messenger that Hillsborough might be responsible; Hillsborough in turn directed the messenger to San Mateo, and by the time firefighters arrived, both structures were fully engulfed in flames.

By late March 1924, the creditors of Pacific City had assumed control and announced the company would be reorganized under the leadership of Edmond Levy. Plans were made to open the resort on July 1, 1924, but the opening was delayed until July 4. Admission to the park itself was made free that year, with a small fee for automobile parking. In March 1925, San Mateo County Superior Court Judge George H. Buck granted the Howard Estate's foreclosure petition, forcing the site to liquidate its assets.

==== Legacy ====
The carousel which operated there, as well as the "little puffer" miniature train ride, can still be enjoyed at the San Francisco Zoo. The Dentzel Carousel Company built the menagerie carousel for Pacific City, and it was moved to what was then Fleishhacker Zoo in 1925; it has since undergone restoration in 1978, 1994, and 2000.

Historians have traced the train back to a class built and operated originally at the 1904 Louisiana Purchase Exposition by the Miniature Railway Company. This particular train was known to have run along the Santa Cruz Beach Boardwalk as the Bay Shore Limited between 1907 and 1915 before it was sold for scrap to a Ford dealer in San Francisco. After running at Pacific City, it was hidden in Burlingame for two years to avoid being impounded, then sold to Herbert Fleishhacker for his eponymous zoo in 1925, where it ran until 1978, when it was stored to clear space for a new gorilla exhibit. The train was restored in 1997 by volunteers at the Golden Gate Railroad Museum and resumed passenger service at the zoo.

The Pacific City beach is known presently as the Coyote Point Promenade. An informational plaque with a summary of Pacific City history was placed by E Clampus Vitus in October 1999 near the present-day boardsports rental shop. Rehabilitation of the beach is being performed in two phases; the first phase, covering the western half, was completed in 2014 and rebuilt the portion of the San Francisco Bay Trail that ran along the shoreline, along with placing rock revetment to protect the trail and rebuilding the public access ramps to the Bay. The second phase is scheduled to be completed in spring 2022, and will include parking reconfiguration and a new beach. During the eastern promenade work, the remnants of 35 wooden piers that once supported the Pacific City Boardwalk were removed, as they posed a tripping hazard to beachgoers.

=== Educational use ===
In 1936, the Howard Company proposed to sell the 65 acres (26 ha) to the cities of San Mateo, Burlingame, and Hillsborough for US$65,000 (equivalent to $1,510,000 in 2025); although the proposal was rebuffed, it led to negotiations to acquire the wooded knoll of Coyote Point itself in addition to the ex-Pacific City land. The first steps were taken in 1940 to convert the area to a park, when San Mateo County's Parks and Recreation Department purchased 727 acres (294 ha) from the Howard family, of which 329 acres (133 ha) were underwater. The purchase included 7,000 ft (2,100 m) of shoreline.

In 1942, the federal government purchased 10 acres (4.0 ha) of land on Coyote Point for one of three Merchant Marine Cadet Basic schools, the Pacific Coast Cadet Corps (the other two were for the Atlantic Coast Cadet Corps at Kings Point, New York and the Gulf Coast Cadet Corps at Pass Christian, Mississippi). The merchant marine training program had been shortened from 48 to 18 months, in three stages:

1. Basic School (lasting 3 months, serving as Fourth Class Cadet-Midshipmen at Kings Point, San Mateo, or Pass Christian)
2. Shipboard experience (6 months, Third Class aboard merchant vessels)
3. Academy (9 months, Second and First Class at Kings Point)

The Pacific Coast Merchant Marine Cadet Basic School had started aboard the ex-riverboat Delta Queen on 1 July 1941; enrollment quickly outgrew the ship, and the school moved to land-based facilities on Treasure Island. With the outbreak of war, enrollment exceeded the capacity of facilities on Treasure Island and US$450,000 (equivalent to $8,867,000 in 2025) was appropriated to enlarge the school in May 1942. Plans were swiftly drawn up by Cdr. Ralph M. Sheaf, and construction began on the facilities at Coyote Point on June 25, 1942. The campus was built in a cleared area of the Knoll. The Basic School at San Mateo Point opened on August 15, 1942 and was officially dedicated on August 21, 1943 with a capacity of 528 cadets. Cadets regularly practiced "abandon ship" drills, climbing to the top of a three-story tower and jumping feet-first into the Bay, sometimes into water deliberately fouled with oil and set afire. By June 1944, 4,111 had completed basic training at San Mateo Point, but budget cuts forced the school's closure by January 1947.

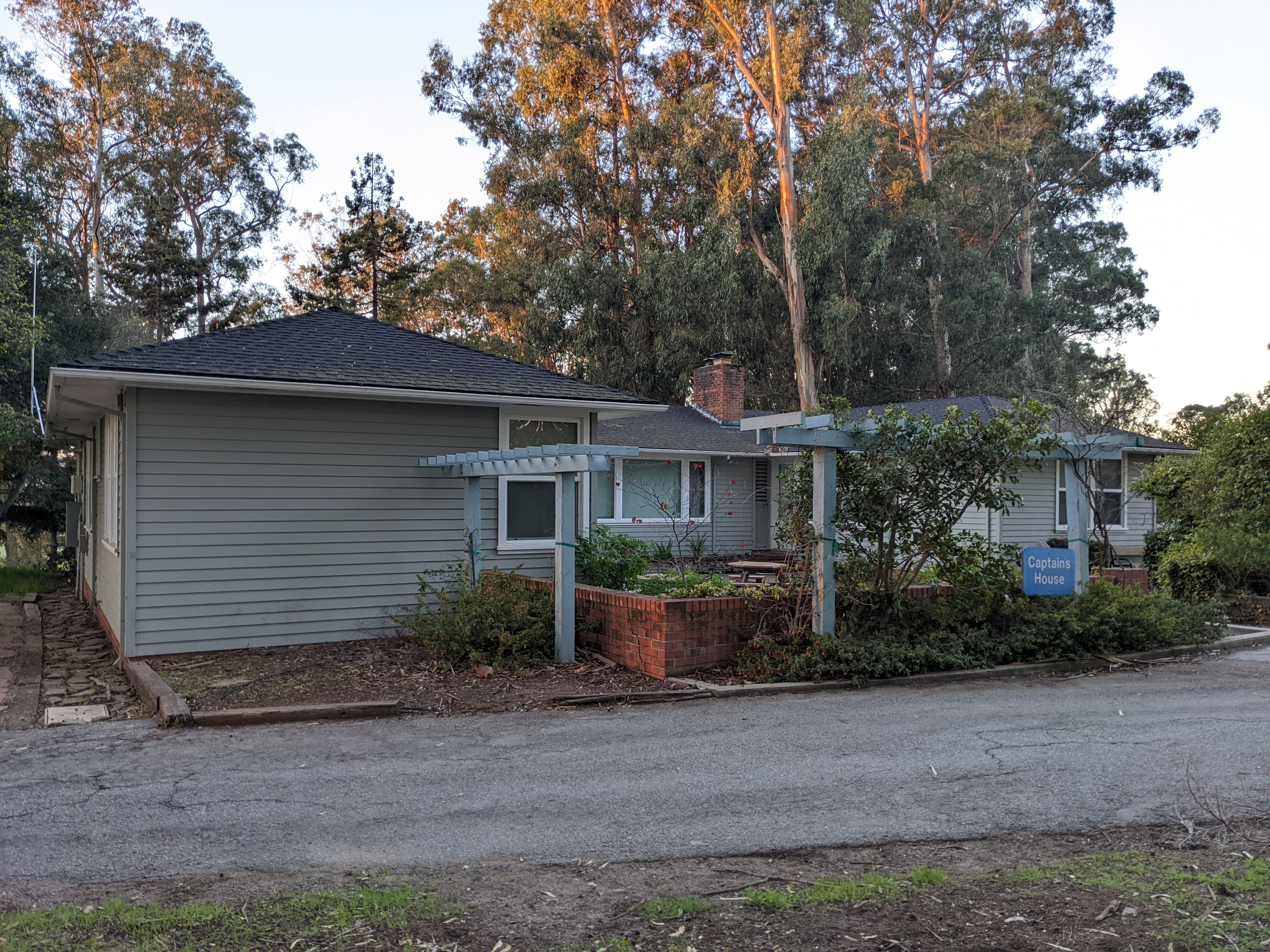
Commandant's House (now Captain's House), 2021

In 1946, the Cadet School buildings were purchased by San Mateo Junior College to serve as the main college campus, accommodating the expected influx of students taking advantage of the GI Bill after the war. The entrance to the Coyote Point campus featured two pillars topped with eagles, leftover from the Cadet School. Under an agreement with the county, when enrollments had decreased to a certain level, the land and buildings would revert to the county. However, Elon Hildreth, who became the new president of San Mateo Junior College in 1952, loved the site and lobbied to have Coyote Point established as the College's permanent site; Hildreth moved into the Commandant's House, which was renamed the President's House, and had served as the residence for the commanding officer of the Maritime Academy. After Hildreth resigned in 1956, he was replaced by Julio Bortolazzo, who turned the college's efforts to a new campus at its present site in the San Mateo Highlands. The new campus opened in 1963, and Coyote Point reverted to the county.

=== Park ===
At the time, the county acquired 402 acres (163 ha), of which 350 acres (140 ha) were underwater. A master plan was prepared in 1971. Under Ralph Shaw, Director of Parks and Recreation, and his successor, Harry Dean Jr., the park's trail system was laid out. Dean recounted: "After a while, Coyote Point was my favorite park. When I came to the county, the Point was just a small beach and a few picnic areas ... the park had to be designed around the already existent rifle range, the museum and the marina." By the time Dean retired in 1991, Coyote Point was the most-visited park in the county park system, welcoming more than 500,000 visitors per year. Since the initial acquisitions, an additional 80 acres (32 ha) have been acquired from the Ideal Cement Company, bringing the present size of the park to 687 acres (278 ha), of which 538 acres (218 ha) are underwater.

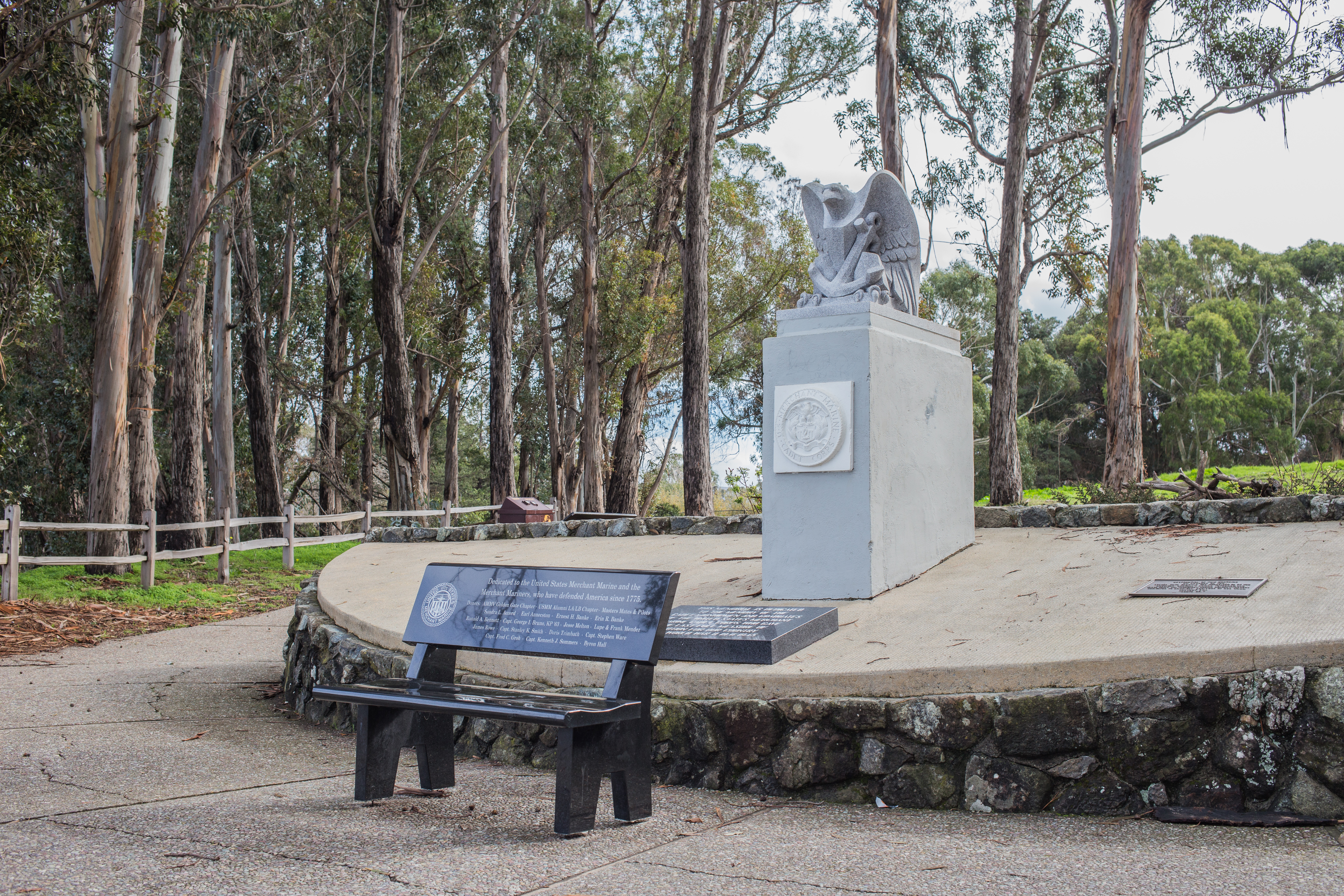
Merchant Marine Memorial

A large globe and anchor were kept at the Cadet School and remained during its time as the Junior College as a memorial; the anchor was later moved to a spot near the Marina. In 1974, a new Merchant Marine Memorial was installed at an overlook facing north from the Knoll; it was extensively restored and re-dedicated on December 2, 2011. Improvements included new stone walls, new plaques, a replacement eagle statue, and the addition of a section of chain and anchor, donated from a Victory ship of the Suisun Bay Reserve Fleet.

== Facilities ==
Selected locations in Coyote Point
- Facilities
- Buildings
- Points of interest
1 Magic Mountain Playground
2 Equipment rental / snack stand
3 Bathing beach
4 Shooting range
5 Captain's House
6 Merchant Marine Memorial
7 CuriOdyssey
8 Coyote Point Marina
9 Coyote Point Yacht Club
10 Cadet School anchor
11 Poplar Creek Golf Course clubhouse
12 Peninsula Humane Society

Coyote Point is divided into three sub-areas:

1. Peninsula Beach Shoreline, which occupies the flat western part of the park, extending east to the access road for the beach parking lot near the shooting range
2. The Knoll & Eucalyptus Area, which is the elevated, forested bluff that occupies the central section of the park
3. Coyote Point Marina and Shoreline Meadow/Marsh, which is the eastern portion that includes the marina, yacht club, and connects to the city of San Mateo's Shoreline Parks system to the south

The park contains many trails for walking and bicycling, and includes sections of the San Francisco Bay Trail. The Tour de Peninsula bicycle race starts and ends within the park. In addition, there are many small picnic areas throughout the park, eight larger picnic areas available by registration, the Captains House Conference Facility, the Coyote Point Pistol and Rifle Range, CuriOdyssey, the Magic Mountain Playground and the Coyote Point Marina.

There is a large parking lot on the Knoll, near the Captain's House and former site of the Castaway restaurant; before it was paved, it served as the football field for the College of San Mateo.

=== Shooting range ===
Quarrying for the shooting range began in 1961 and it was completed in 1962; the range was initially open to the public and was one of the first safety ranges approved by the National Rifle Association, but it later was limited to law enforcement personnel only. The range was operated by the county parks department until 1997, when it was turned over to the San Mateo County Sheriff's Office. It serves as the primary qualification and training facility for 24 law enforcement agencies. In 2017, a new indoor pistol training facility was completed using funds from private donors. The existing outdoor rifle range was refurbished in 2018 and 2019 using funds provided by the same donors.

Since then, it has been reopened to the public, operating three nights per week. All brass and lead are trapped and contained on-site and recycled to prevent contamination of the park. Public shooting is operated by the Coyote Point Rifle & Pistol Club.

=== The Castaway ===
The Castaway Restaurant was in the northwest section of the Knoll. It opened in 1964 with nautical theming and featured valet parking due to its location within the park; by the 1970s, The Castaway was advertising its tiki theme. The restaurant shut down in 1997 for a planned renovation to add a second story; however, the building subsequently was vandalized and burned and torn down in February 2008.

=== Coyote Point Marina and Yacht Club ===
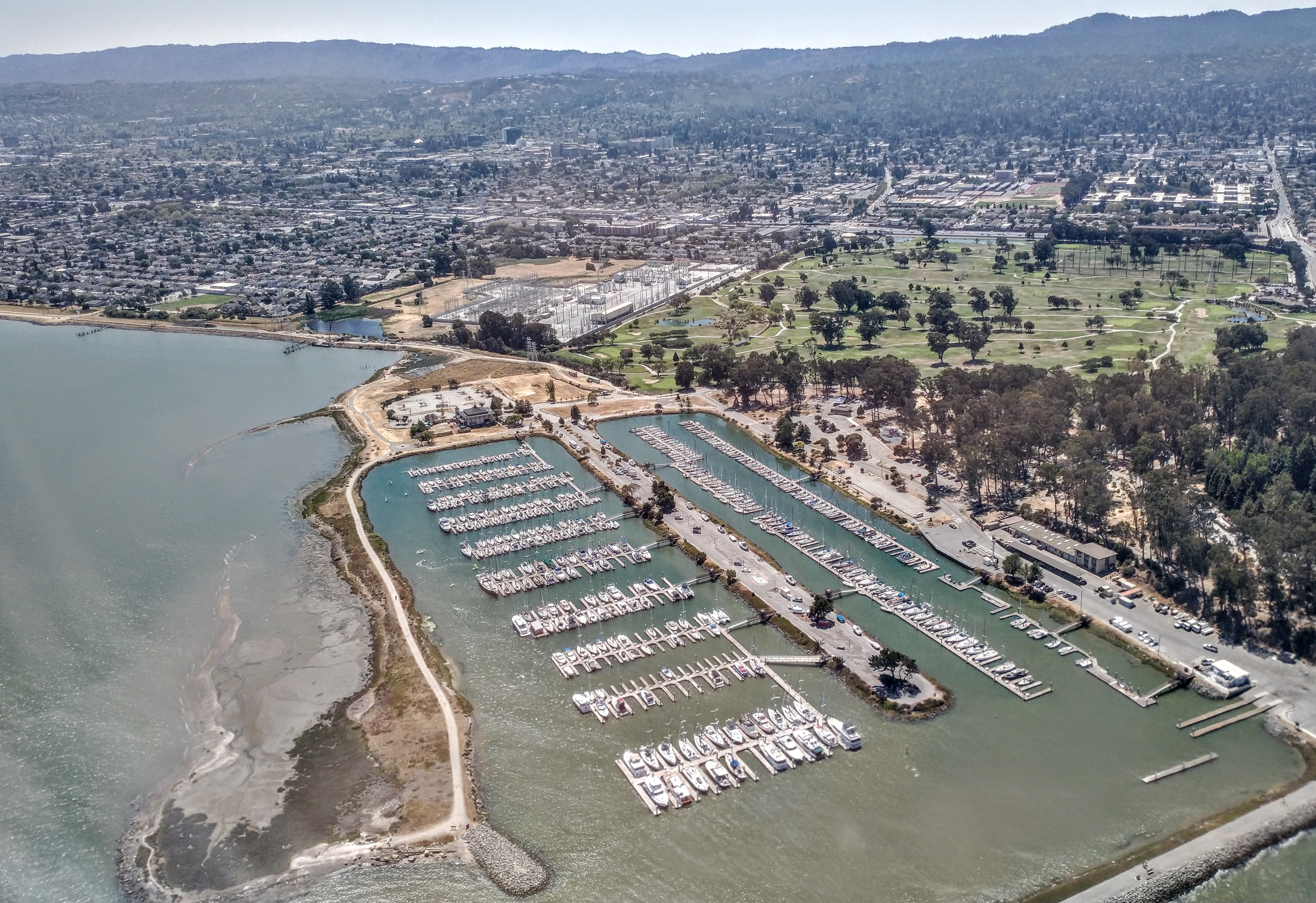
Aerial view of Coyote Point Marina (2021); the CPYC building is visible at the southern end of Basin 2.

The harbor on the east side of Coyote Point was dredged in the 1930s; the spoils were placed in the middle of the new harbor, forming the divider between the two basins. The narrower Basin 1 is to the west of Basin 2. A third basin has been planned but not built; rubble from the first, demolished San Mateo Bridge (1929–1967) was placed along the eastern property line and would define the limit of the Basin 3. The Coyote Point Yacht Club (CPYC) was formed on July 20, 1941, and initially held its meetings at the old San Mateo city hall near the downtown railroad station; a permanent clubhouse was built on jetty in the new basin and completed in the mid-1940s. Work on the new CPYC building was started on September 23, 1967, and completed by March 2, 1968. The current building includes a dining room with a seated capacity of 300. CPYC sponsored its first Shark Derby, a shark-fishing competition, in 1947; the Derby gained fame in 1948 when President Harry S Truman made a fifteen-minute stop at Burlingame to visit.

Passengers from Japan Air Lines Flight 2 were ferried to the Yacht Club after the DC-8 made an unscheduled landing in the water nearby.

=== CuriOdyssey ===
CuriOdyssey, formerly the Coyote Point Museum for Environmental Education is a hands-on science museum and native animal zoo located in the park at 1651 Coyote Point Drive in San Mateo, California, United States. The museum was incorporated in April 1953 as the San Mateo County Junior Museum using a surplus Quonset hut.

- The Main Concourse Science Exhibits offer a variety of hands-on science exhibits that allow children and families to experience natural phenomena up-close.
- The Wildlife Habitats consist of 25 naturalistic habitats that house over 50 non-releasable animals native to California, including a bobcat, river otter, snakes, golden eagles, Channel Island fox, banana slugs, turtles, owls, snowy egret, tarantula, Western toads, herons, turkey vultures, raccoons, and others.
- The Aviary is a 4,000-square-foot (370 m^{2}) walk-through facility that houses over a dozen non-releasable, native California birds.
- The Invertebrate Corner houses a variety of native invertebrates including a California blond tarantula, black widow spider, dermestid beetles and others.
- The Gardens cover about 1.3 acres (0.53 ha) and consist of a variety of plants, some native. They include a hummingbird garden, butterfly habitat, and the Nature's Marketplace Garden which features native plants used by Native Californians.

== Gallery ==
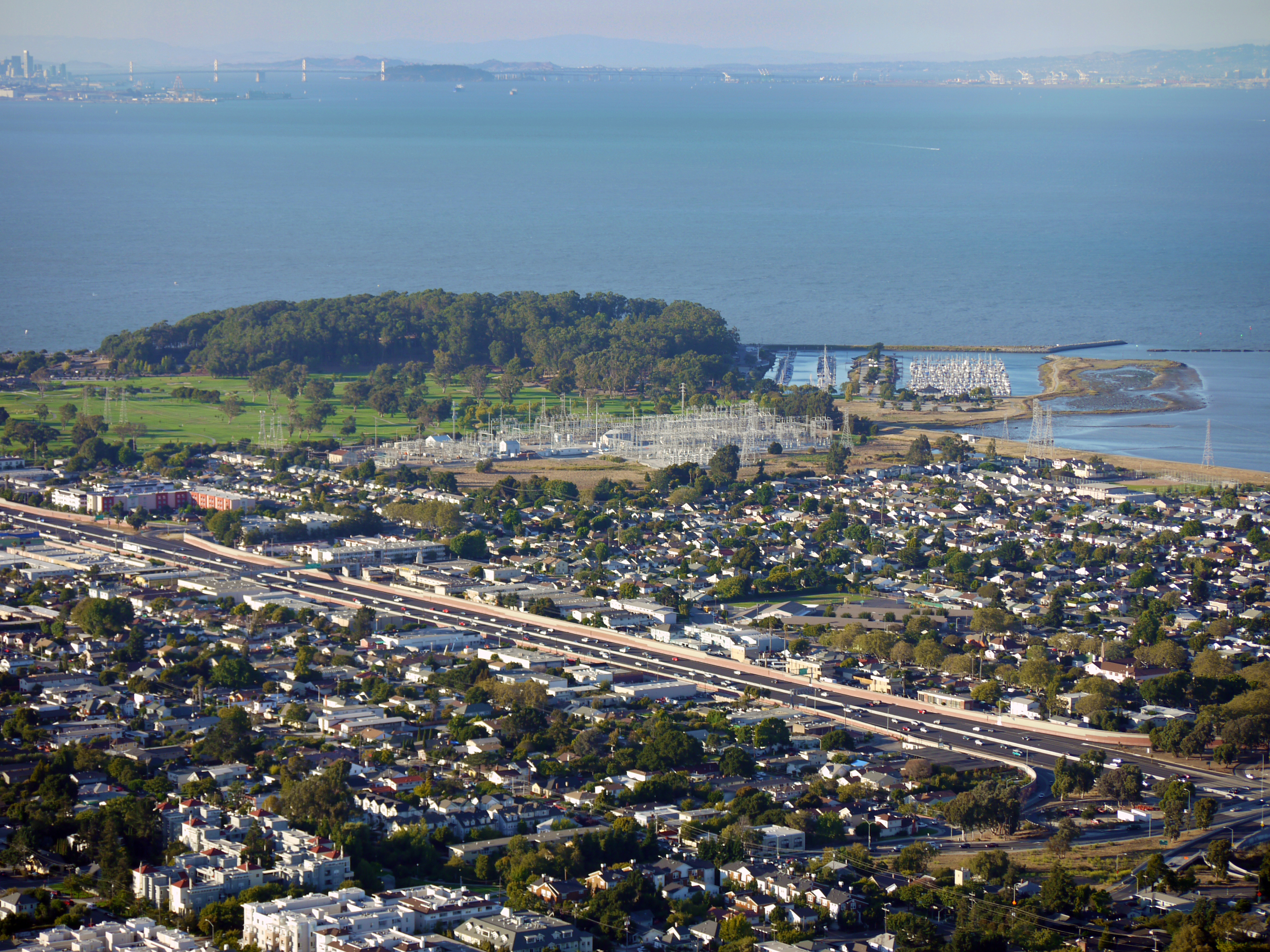
Coyote Point is covered in eucalyptus trees

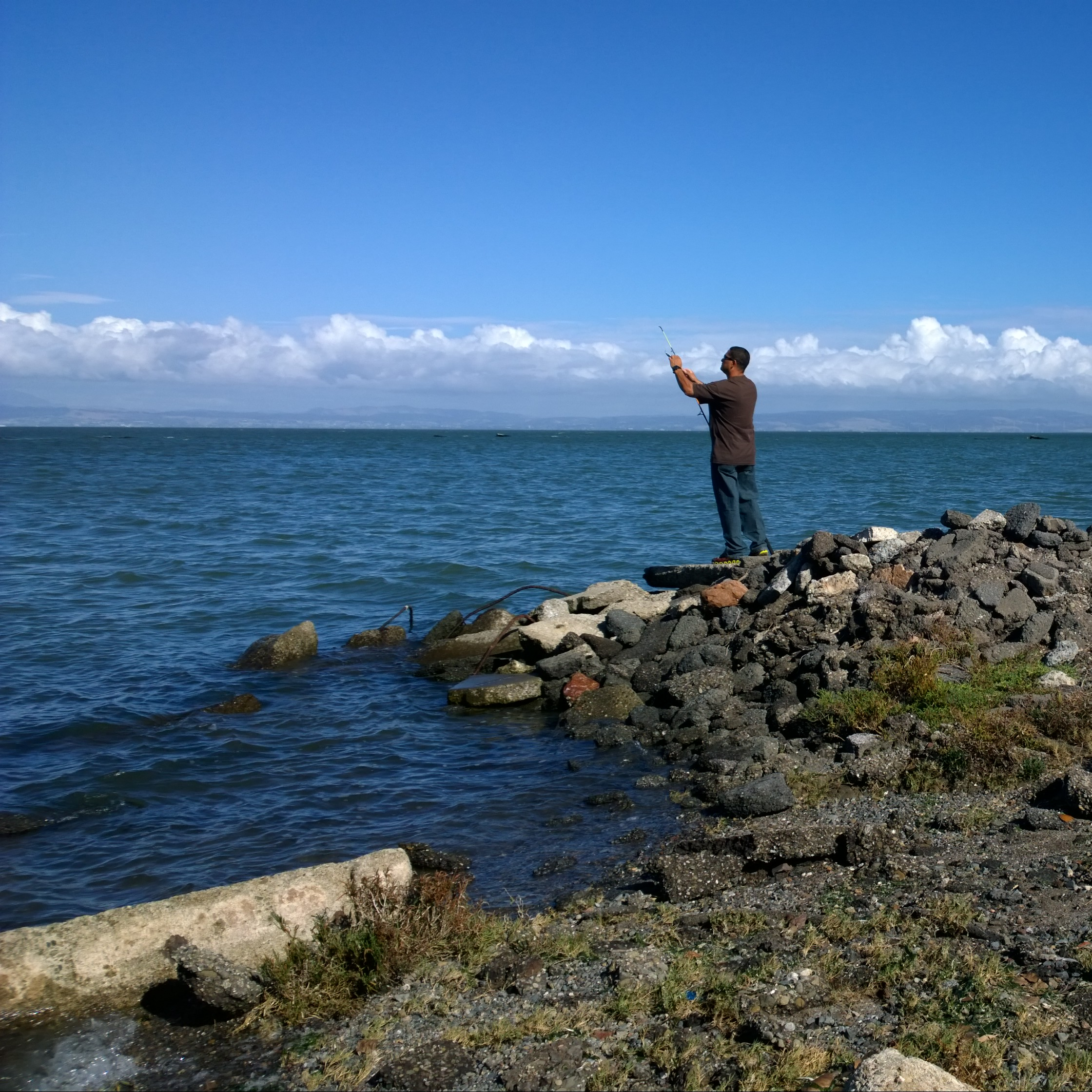
Fisherman at Coyote Point

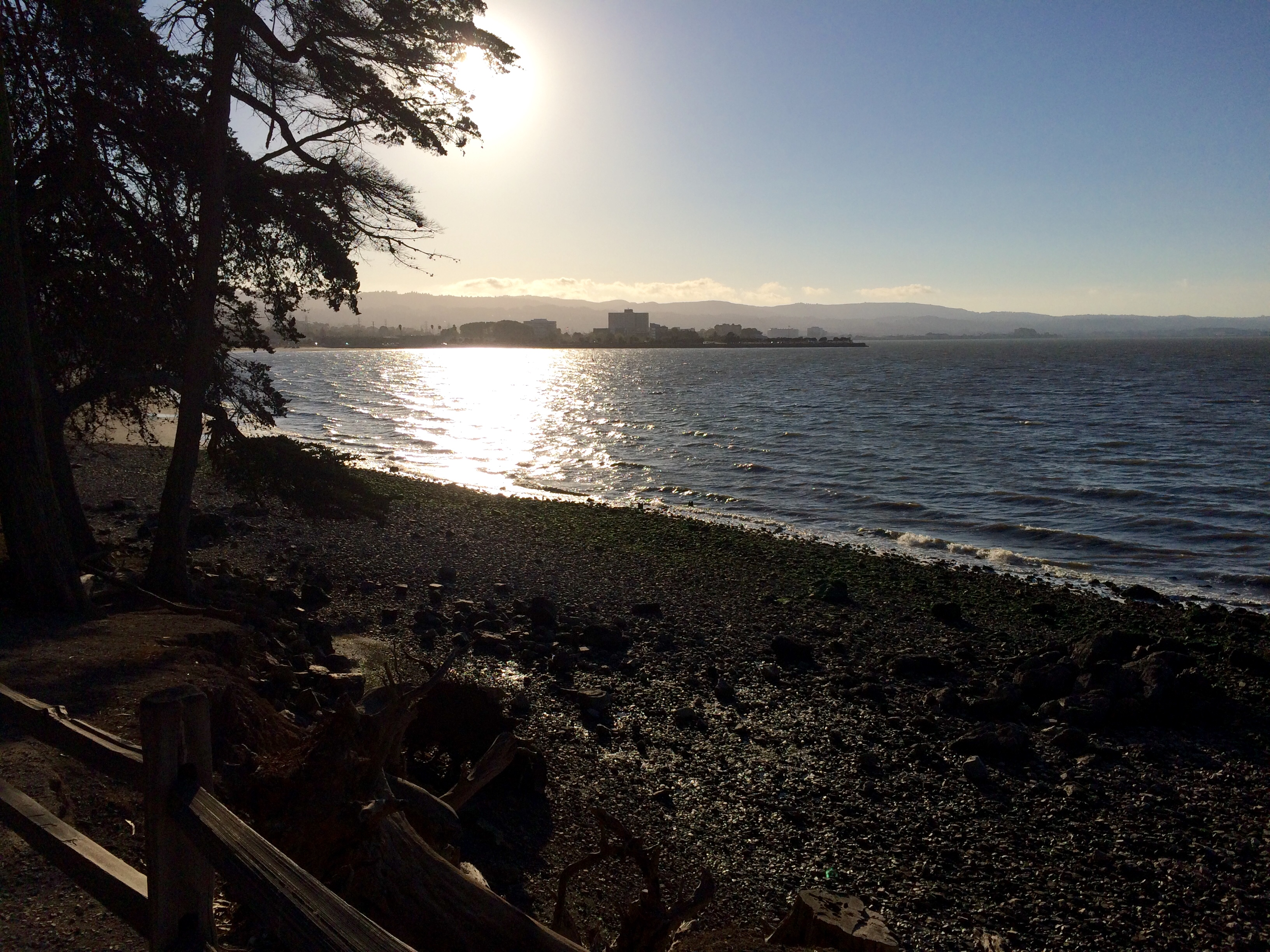
View from Coyote Point facing Burlingame

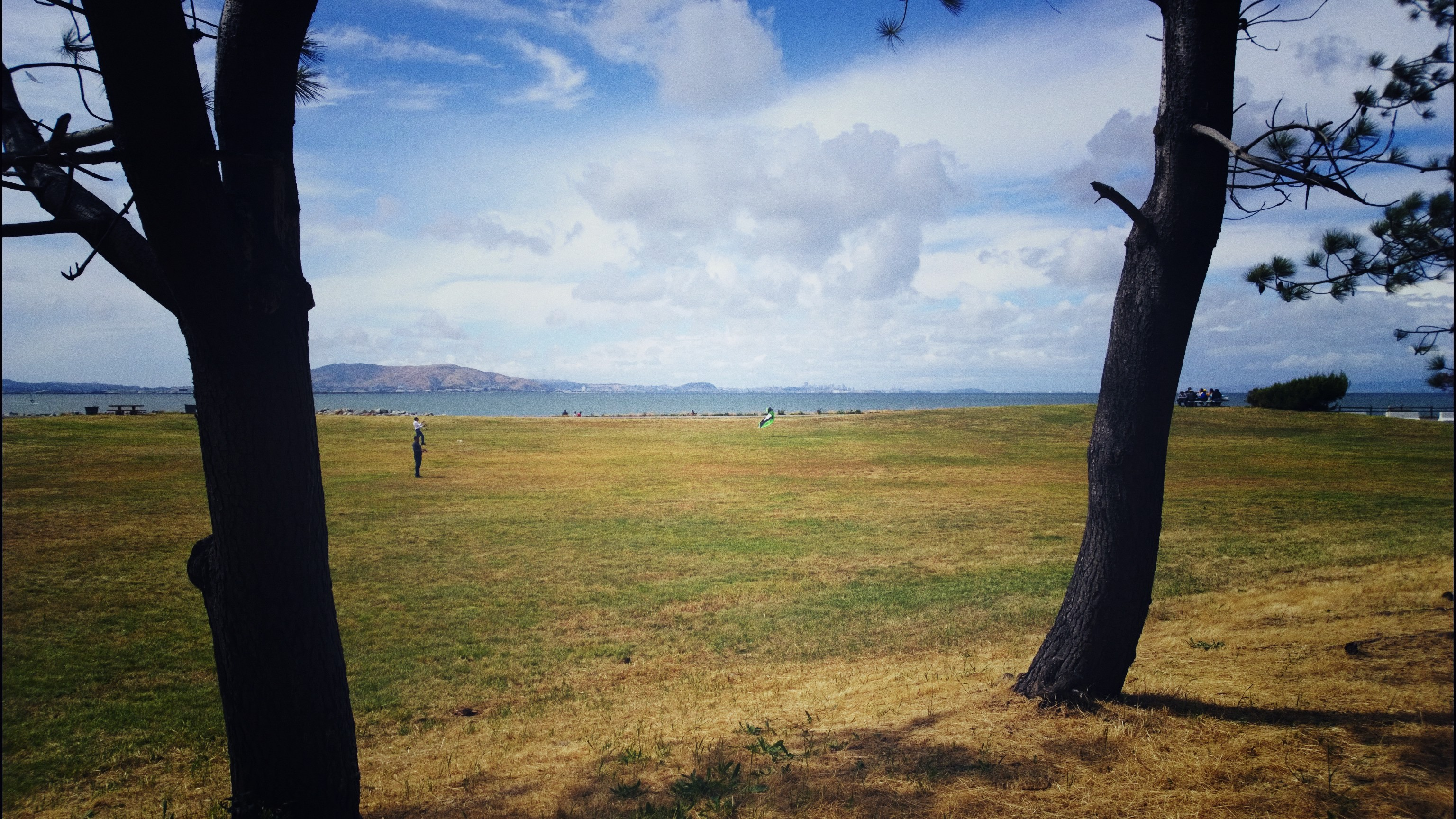
Steady breezes and open space facilitate kite flying (San Bruno Mountain in background)

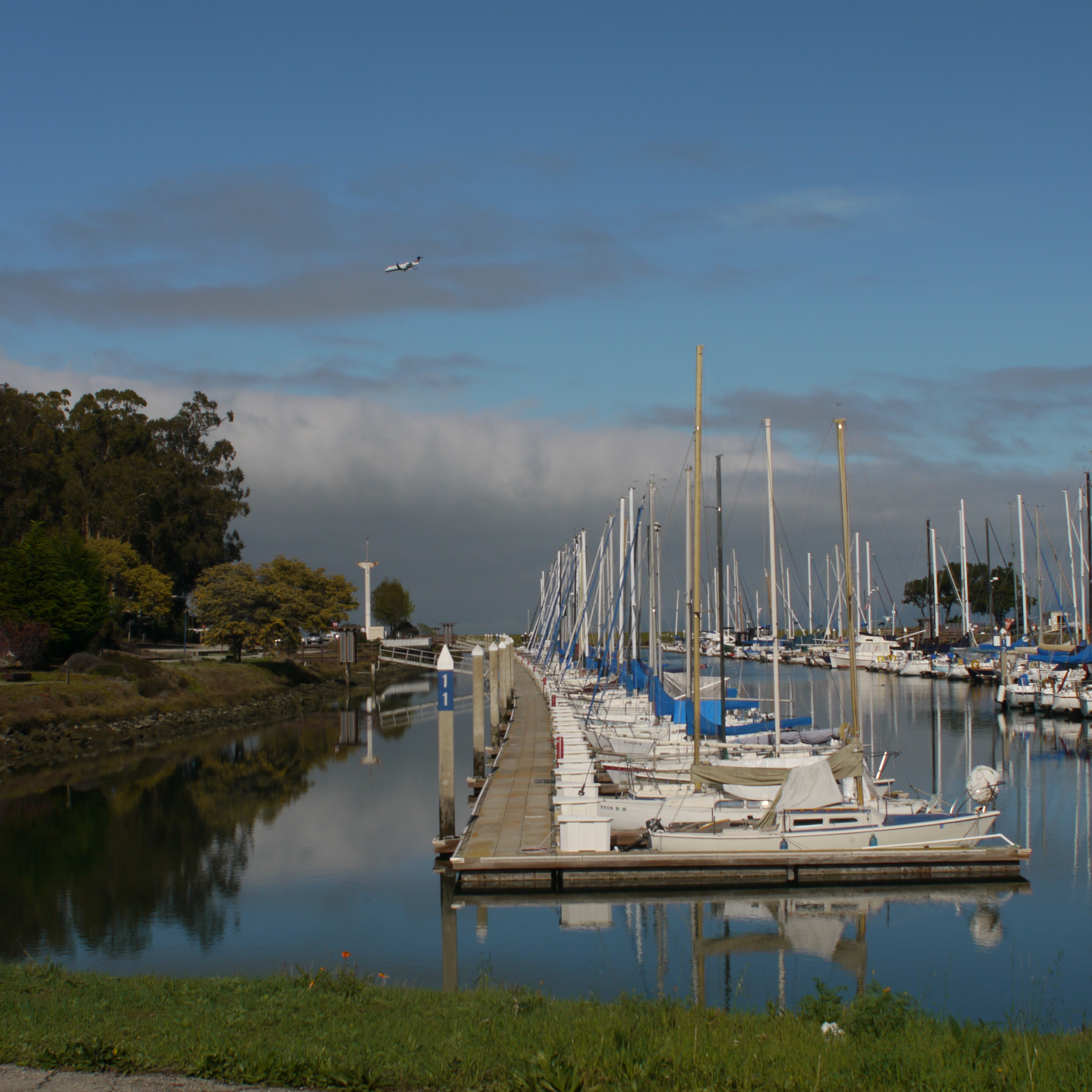
Slips at Coyote Point Marina

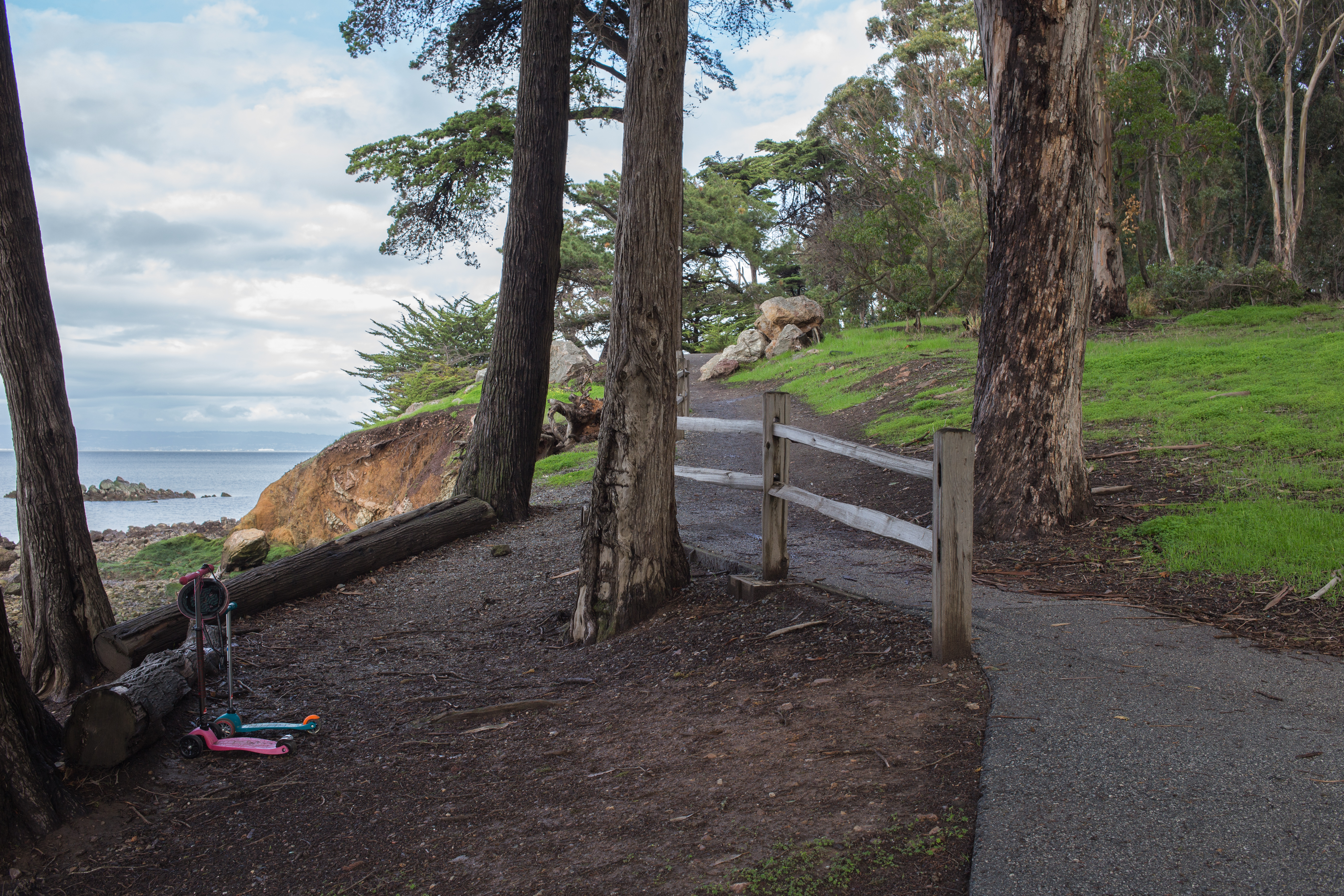
The Bluff Trail along the Bay shoreline

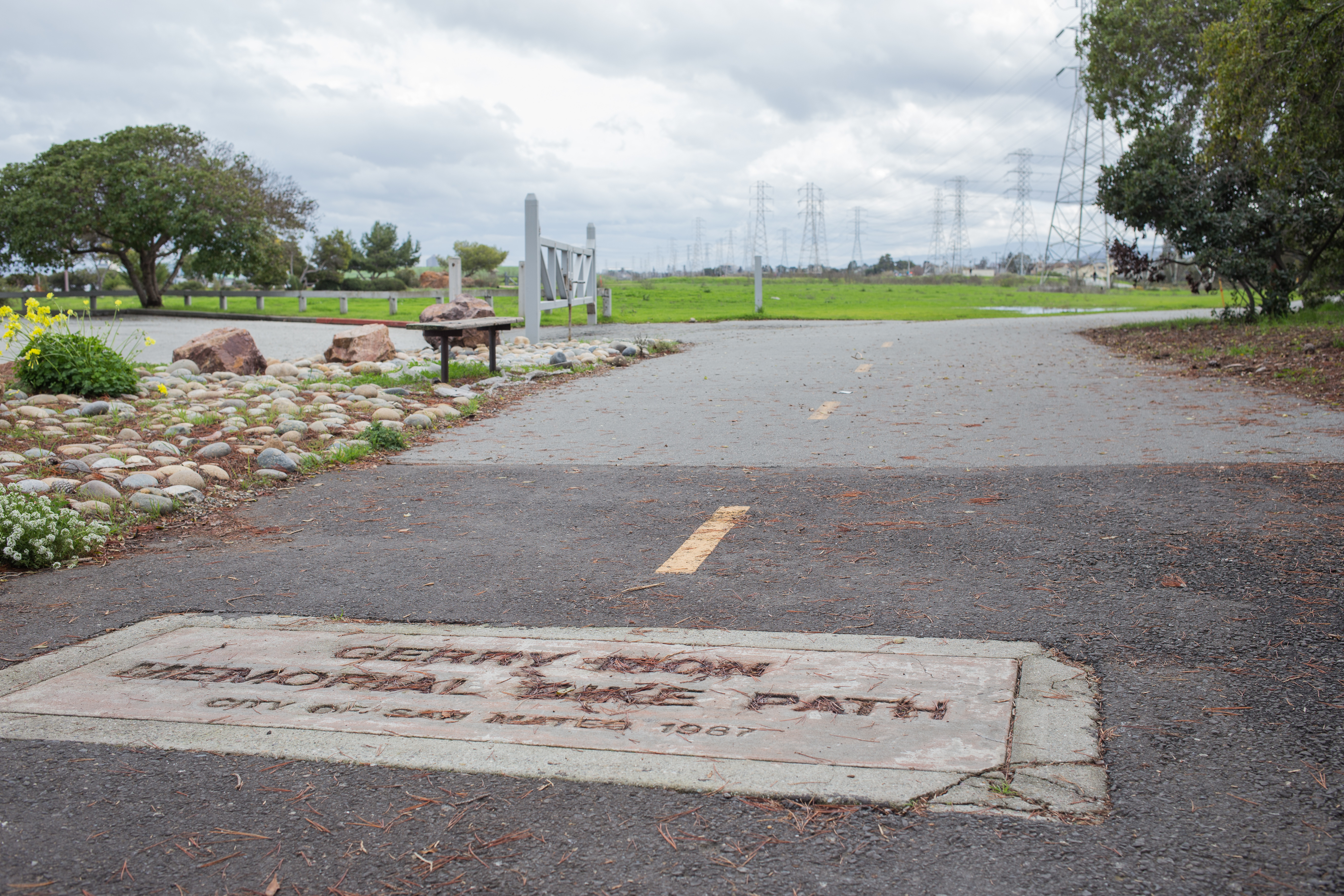
The Bay Trail runs along Coyote Point Drive

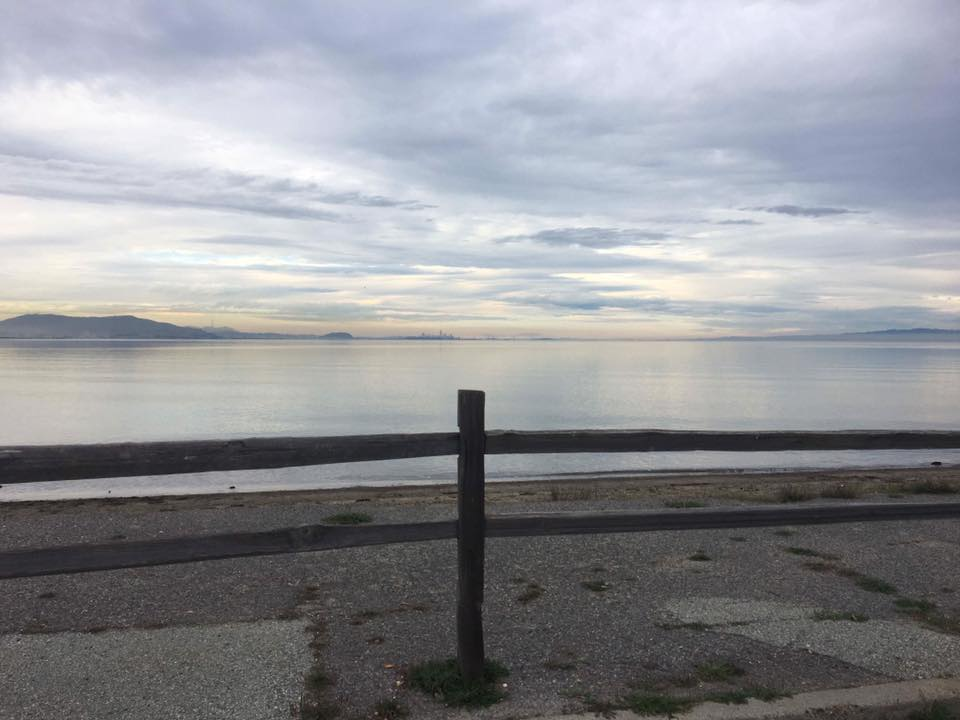
Coyote Point looking toward San Francisco city
