= Bortolazzo =

Bortolazzo is a surname. Notable people with the surname include:

- Julio Bortolazzo (1915–2006), American academic administrator
- Ken Bortolazzo (fl. from 2006), American sculptor
