= College of San Mateo =

Community college in San Mateo, California, US

- Former name: San Mateo Junior College
- Motto: Gateway to Achievement
- Type: Public community college
- Established: 1922; 104 years ago
- Parent institution: San Mateo County Community College District
- President: Manuel Alejandro Pérez
- Students: 13,180 (2022–23)
- Location: San Mateo, California, United States; 37°32′10″N 122°20′10″W
- Campus: 153 acres; Suburban
- Colors: Blue and White
- Nickname: Bulldogs
- Sporting affiliations: Coast Conference; Northern California Football Conference; 3C2A
- Website: collegeofsanmateo.edu

- Location within San Francisco Bay Area Location within California Location within the United States

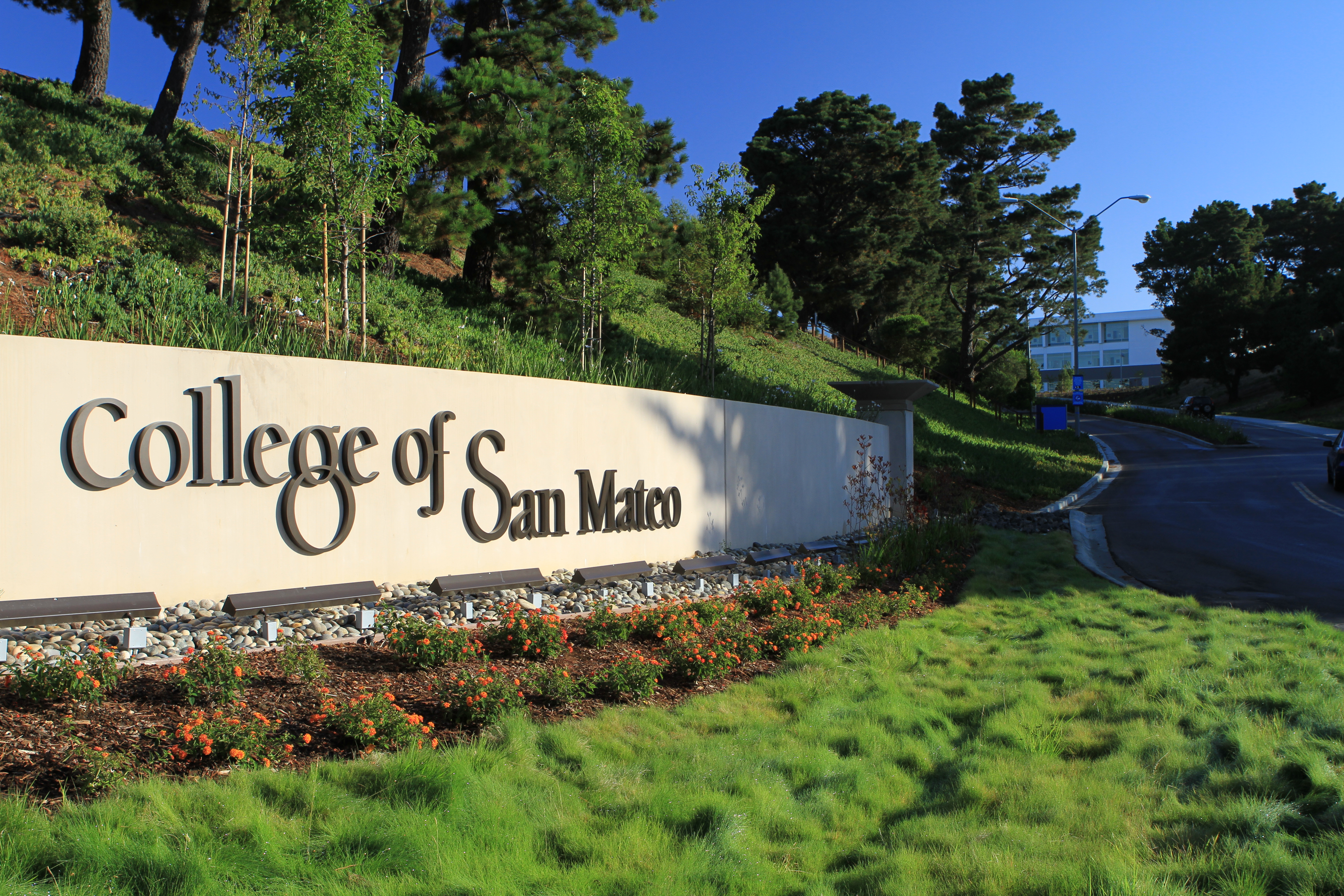
Entrance to the College of San Mateo

College of San Mateo (CSM) is a public community college in San Mateo, California. It is part of the San Mateo County Community College District. College of San Mateo is located at the northern corridor of Silicon Valley and situated on a 153-acre site in the San Mateo hills. The college currently serves approximately 15,000 day, evening and weekend students. The college offers 69 A.A./A.S. degree majors and 81 certificate programs.

== History ==
William L. Glascock, the principal of San Mateo High School, first proposed a junior college for San Mateo in the early 1920s as an alternative to the traditional four-year college. Tuition at four-year institutions cost up to US$1,000 (equivalent to $19,000 in 2025) per year at the time; at the junior college, students could instead live at home while earning credit equivalent to the freshman and sophomore years of a four-year school. The college was initially founded as the San Mateo Junior College (SMJC) after being approved by voters on March 31, 1922. The first classes started on August 22 of that year in a building shared with San Mateo High School. The first registered student was Marjorie Brace, who could not attend Stanford because of the high cost of tuition. She joined an initial class of 30 students, which would grow to 48 by the end of the academic year. The typical target for students graduating from the junior college was either Berkeley or Stanford; although the junior college was "in a valley between two mountains of conceit—Stanford and the University of California" as described by early faculty, the curriculum at San Mateo was designed to allow graduating students to continue studies at the larger four-year institutions.

The school colors of blue and white were chosen, according to anecdotes from early graduates, either from the colors of those two targets (white from Stanford, blue from Berkeley), or because those were the leftover ribbon colors from a student tasked with decorating a dance. The origins of the bulldog mascot are similarly murky: either all other animals had already been chosen by other colleges, or a local kennel which specialized in raising English bulldogs offered to have one of their animals, Rival Goldstone, appear at sporting events.

Second year students would haze incoming freshmen in one of the earliest traditions at SMJC, which required first year male students to carry decorated wooden paddles. Sophomore students would stop first-years so they could "frequently and strenuously [apply the paddle] for any of a dozen real or imagined infractions." Hazing culminated in an all-day event held semi-annually called The Brawl, which was filmed by Fox Movietone News on February 19, 1928. Incoming dean Charles S. Morris ended physical hazing in 1931.

Dean Morris had a fatal heart attack in 1952, and students and faculty members began proposing a name change for SMJC. Proposed names included San Mateo College, San Mateo City College, and Peninsula College, but the name was finally changed to College of San Mateo on April 14, 1954, in part because the initials (CSM) would also honor the memory of Dean Morris.

=== Enrollment ===
Enrollment at SMJC grew rapidly from the initial class of 30 in 1922: 137 students enrolled in 1923, and the freshman class alone was 102 in 1924. SMJC reached enrollments of 430 students (250 freshmen) in 1926 and 480 students in 1927, when classes moved back to the Baldwin campus. It was the only junior college on the Peninsula until 1935 and attracted commuter students from San Francisco (who used San Francisco and San Mateo Electric Railway and/or Peninsula Commute trains), San Jose, and the East Bay. By 1935, enrollment had reached 1,500, but fell back to 1,000 when San Francisco Junior College opened that fall.

The first classes for workers to develop additional skills were offered in 1932, when a vocational class in aeronautics started. An Adult Program was introduced in 1936 for evening classes at the Baldwin campus, and 500 students signed up by the end of the first week. By 1943, 5,073 were enrolled in evening classes. During World War II, enrollment dropped as many potential students were serving in the military instead; SMJC shifted to teaching servicemen and radar courses. Unused land at Delaware was planted with crops as a victory garden. The college set up a Community Canning Center in June 1944 and had produced 108,000 cans by the end of the year. Enrollment rebounded after the war; although there were only 35 graduates in 1945, there were 1,800 students enrolled in 1946 and 2,400 in 1947, with 307 graduating in 1949. 5,621 attended classes on September 30, 1963, the first day of classes at the new College Heights campus.

As initially founded, SMJC served students matriculating from the San Mateo Union High School District; Jefferson Union and Half Moon Bay were added in 1937; Sequoia Union and South San Francisco followed in the 1960s; and the college served all San Mateo County residents by 1976, when the La Honda-Pescadero Unified School District joined.

=== San Mateo Community College District ===
By then, two more campuses had opened in what had become the San Mateo County Community College District alongside the College of San Mateo: Cañada College (1968, Redwood City) and Skyline College (1969, San Bruno). Julio Bortolazzo is credited with the expansion of what had become the College of San Mateo into the three-college District. In 1956, he formed a 27-member Citizens Committee to study potential sites for a new campus for CSM. The final report filed by the Committee concluded that San Mateo County needed more than one community college.

County voters overwhelmingly approved a $5.9 million bond issue in 1957 based on Committee recommendations, which provided funds to purchase the present-day College Heights campus for CSM as well as the site for Skyline College. In 1962, the parcel for Cañada College was purchased. Voters approved another bond of $12.8 million in March 1964, which provided funds to construct Cañada College (opened 1968) and Skyline College (opened 1969).

San Mateo Junior College/College of San Mateo campus locations
1 Baldwin (1922; 1927–1955)
2 Kohl (1923–1927)
3 Delaware (1939–1963)
4 Coyote Point (1947–1963)
5 College Heights (1963–present)

=== Facilities ===
Upon opening, San Mateo Junior College initially shared facilities with San Mateo High School at what was known as the Baldwin campus, at Baldwin Avenue and San Mateo Drive (then called Griffith Avenue) near downtown San Mateo. One year after opening, San Mateo Junior College moved to the mansion built for Charles Polhemus and later purchased by William Kohl in what is now Central Park. At the Kohl mansion, classes were held in parlors and bedrooms, the veranda was enclosed to serve as the library, assemblies were held in the grand dining room, the women's gymnasium and locker room was created from the kitchen, and a student store opened in the former wine cellar in 1926. The Junior College soon outgrew the Kohl mansion, and temporary buildings (including tents) were erected in Central Park to hold classes.

In 1927, the high school moved to its present location at Delaware and Poplar, and the Junior College moved back to the Baldwin campus. However, enrollments rose rapidly, and by 1935, the Baldwin campus was hosting 1,500 students in a building designed for 500. Later that year, SMJC purchased 30 acres (12 ha) at North Delaware and Peninsula which had previously been occupied by Pacific Studios, a silent film production lot, for US$67,500 (equivalent to $1,590,000 in 2025).

In 1939, science classes started at new buildings on the Delaware campus to relieve overcrowding at the main Baldwin campus. However, after the start of World War II, work on the new campus was suspended. After the war, the college added a third location by leasing the training facility originally constructed for the United States Merchant Marine during World War II at Coyote Point. The Merchant Marines had vacated the Coyote Point facility by January 1947 due to budget cutbacks, and SMJC started offering courses there in September. Different subjects were taught at each of the three sites: science, mathematics, and shop courses at Delaware; art and business at Baldwin; other subjects at Coyote Point. The haste with which Coyote Point had been pressed into service soon became evident; steam pipes for heating developed leaks and airplane traffic to nearby San Francisco International Airport repeatedly interrupted instruction in classrooms built with inadequate insulation.

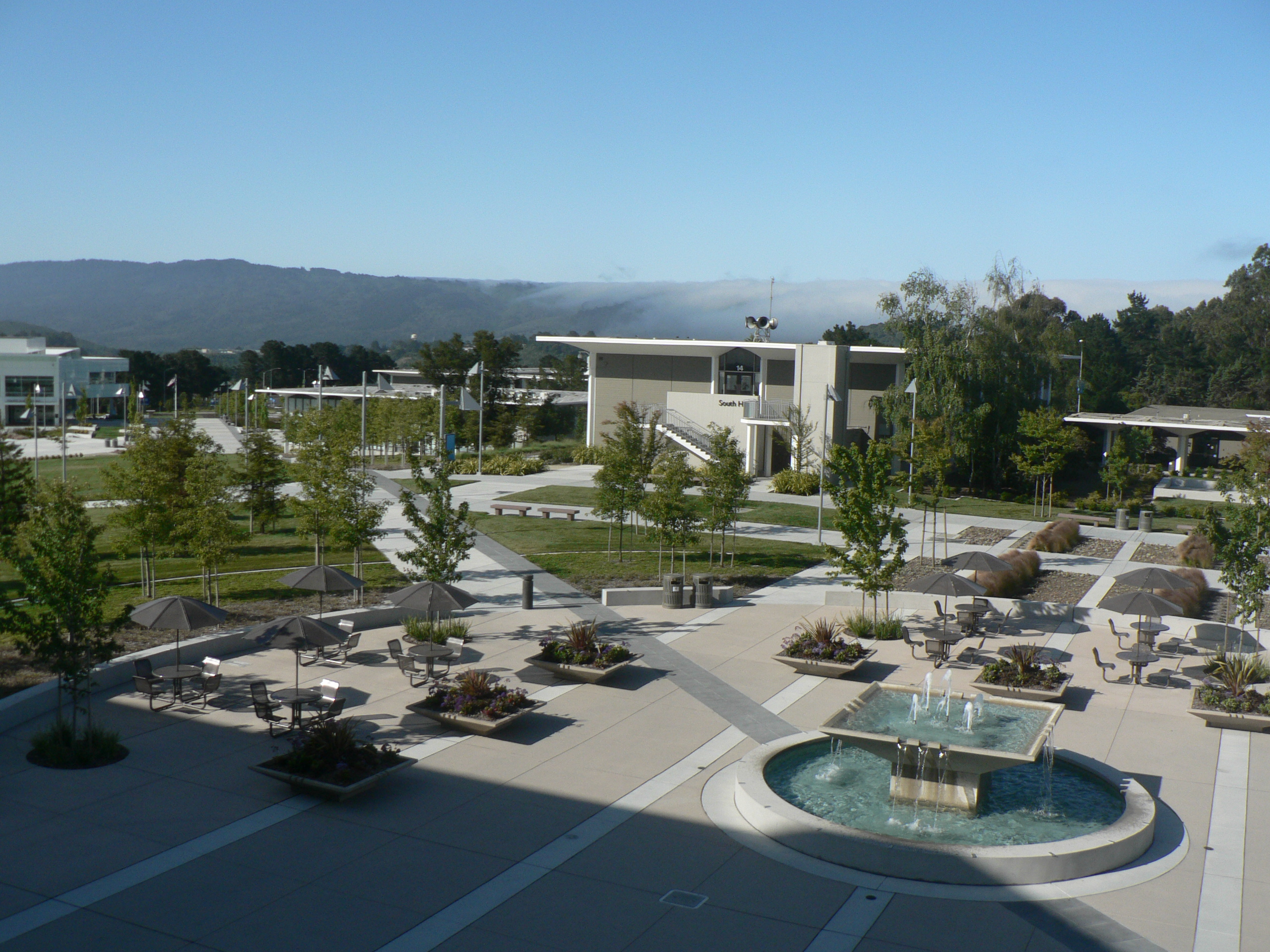
College of San Mateo campus in 2012

A bond issue in 1957 overwhelmingly passed by County voters allowed the college to consolidate into a single site, at what is now known as the College Heights campus. The 153-acre (62 ha) parcel was purchased at a bargain price of $7,280 per acre with the help of an eminent domain lawsuit. Ground was broken at College Heights on October 21, 1960, and the new campus opened on September 30, 1963, one year behind schedule. CSM sold off the Delaware campus on February 21, 1963, for $2.3 million, and the last day at Coyote Point was September 6, 1963. Although classes at started at College Heights, work continued; the new library opened on November 15, and the new campus was dedicated on December 8 of that year. The new campus at College Heights cost nearly $19.5 million; it was refurbished in the 2000s funded by bond measures, including seismic upgrades and a new College Center.

=== Leadership ===
Leaders of SMJC/CSM
Name	Began	Ended	Notes
William Glascock (Note: Superintendent)	1922	1937	
Robert J. "Hoppy" Hopkins (Note: Dean)	1922	1931	
Charles S. "Jum" Morris	1931	1952	Elevated to president and Superintendent in 1937.
Elon Hildreth (Note: President)	1952	1955	Contract was not renewed due to dispute over CSM location; Hildreth proposed a continued presence at Coyote Point.
Julio Bortolazzo	1956	1968	
Robert Ewigleben	1968	1971	
David Mertes	1971	1978	
Lois A. Callahan	1979	1991	First woman president of CSM. Resigned as president to accept position as Chancellor of the San Mateo County Community College District.
Peter Landsberger	1992	1999	Resigned in 1999 to join Los Angeles Community College District.
Shirley J. Kelly	1999	2006	
Michael Claire	2006	2019	Appointed interim Chancellor of SMCCCD in 2019.
Jennifer Taylor-Mendoza	2021	2023	Term started July 1, 2021. Resigned August 23, 2023. Assumed West Valley College presidency August 24, 2023 (West Valley Mission CCD)
Richard Storti	2023	2024	Acting President
Manuel Alejandro Pérez	2024	Present	Term started July 1, 2024.

== Academics ==
=== Accreditation ===
College of San Mateo is accredited by the Accrediting Commission for Community and Junior Colleges.

=== Transfer programs ===
CSM offers transfer admission guarantees with seven of the nine UC campuses, nearly all of the CSU campuses and many private colleges in California.

=== Career and technical programs ===
The college offers more than 75 programs in career areas including multimedia, green technologies, cosmetology, nursing, broadcasting, accounting, computer and information science, fire technology and dental assisting.

=== High school programs ===
San Mateo Middle College is an alternative high school program serving grades 11 and 12 which operates on the CSM campus. Middle College students take three high school classes on campus with high school teachers and fill the remainder of their schedule with college courses. Middle College students come from the San Mateo Union High School District; students in the Cabrillo Unified School District may also be eligible to participate with approval of the Middle College principal.

In Fall 2016, another alternative high school program, Jumpstart was put on the CSM campus, allowing high school students to finish their credits on an online program, and to give them an opportunity to take classes on campus. This allows for students to receive credit for both their high school and college graduation requirements.

== Athletics ==
CSM's championship intercollegiate athletic teams compete at the highest community college level, offering student athletes an opportunity to participate in a team experience. The college offers the following men's sports: football, baseball, track & field, cross country and swimming; and the following women's sports: softball, basketball, track & field, cross country, sand volleyball, indoor volleyball, water polo and swimming.

Pitcher Scott Feldman walked on to the school's baseball team his freshman year. In two seasons, he went 25–2, with a 1.30 ERA and a strikeout-to-walk ratio of 8-to-1. "When Feldman pitched", said Bulldogs coach Doug Williams, "the game was 95% over." He earned Coast Conference Pitcher of the Year honors both as a freshman in 2002 and as a sophomore in 2003, and was also an All-American both years. "He has a gift", Williams said.

=== Athletics Hall of Fame ===
In 2011, CSM established an Athletics Hall of Fame. Among the notable inductees are John Madden, former professional football coach, analyst and broadcaster; Archie Williams, 1936 Olympic gold medalist; and Bill Ring, former professional football player. Names of all of the inductees are on display in CSM's Hall of Fame Plaza.

== Notable alumni ==
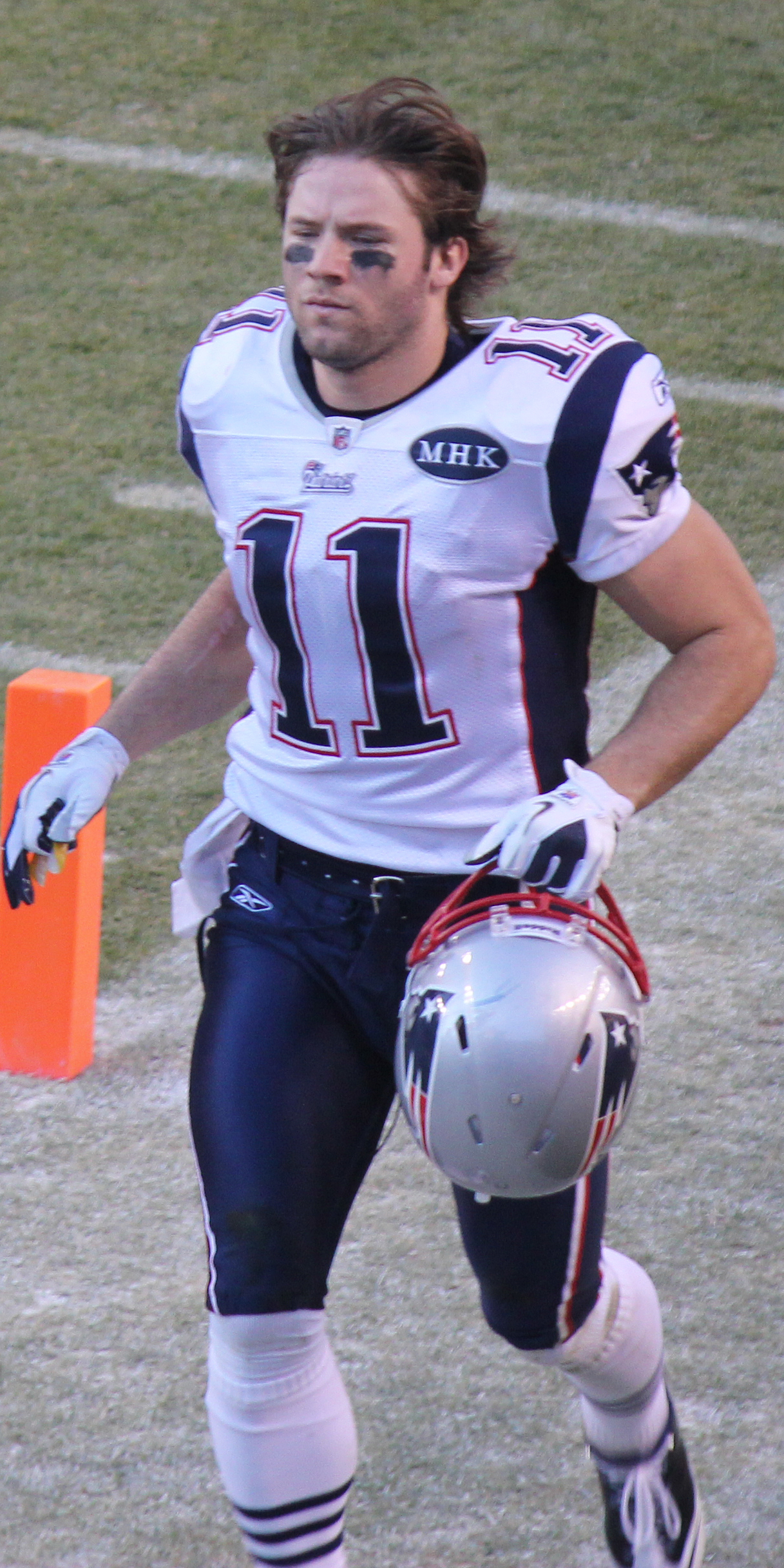
Julian Edelman

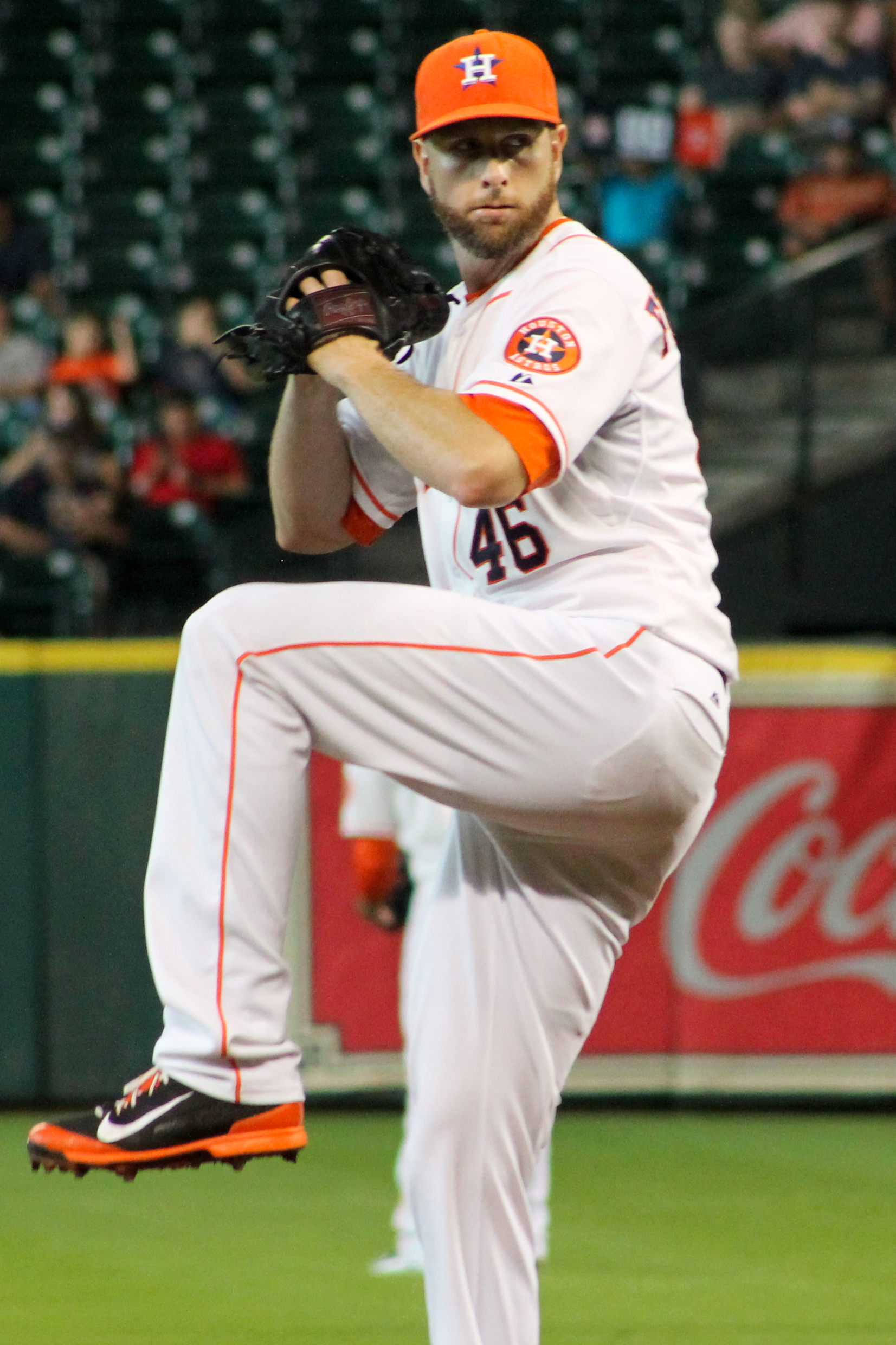
Scott Feldman

- Jeremy Anderson, sculptor
- Jeanne Bates, actress
- Ryan Boschetti, professional football player
- Gregory Buckingham, Olympic swimmer
- Lindsey Buckingham, Fleetwood Mac band member
- Dana Carvey, actor/comedian
- Julian Edelman, professional football player
- Keith Hernandez, professional baseball player
- Scott Feldman, professional baseball player
- Liz Figueroa, politician
- Warren Furutani, politician
- Jennifer Granholm, former governor of Michigan
- Merv Griffin, television personality, actor, singer
- Dennis Haysbert, actor
- Jan Henne, Olympic swimmer
- Jerry Hill, politician
- Tom Huening, politician
- Keala Keanaaina, professional football player
- John Lescroart, author
- Phil Lesh, Grateful Dead band member
- Dick Lotz, professional golfer
- John Madden, professional football coach and sportscaster
- Paul McClellan, professional baseball player
- Bob McClure, professional baseball player
- Guy McIntyre, professional football player
- Jon Miller, San Francisco Giants broadcaster, member of Baseball Hall of Fame
- Antonio Narcisse, professional football player
- Daniel Nava, professional baseball player
- Greg Proops, comedian
- Bill Ring, professional football player
- Edward V. Roberts, director, California State Department of Rehabilitation
- Steve Shafer, professional football coach
- Kurtwood Smith, actor
- James Elms Swett, US Marine Corps fighter pilot; Medal of Honor recipient
- Ted Tollner, college and professional football coach
- Matangi Tonga, professional football player
- Tom Torlakson, State Superintendent of Public Instruction
- J. Craig Venter, scientist, human genome researcher
- Dick Vermeil, professional football coach and sports analyst
- Bill Walsh, professional football coach
- John Wetteland, professional baseball player
- Archie Williams, U.S. Air Force officer, Olympic runner, and teacher

== See also ==
- California Community Colleges system
- Cañada College, a community college located in Redwood City
- City College of San Francisco, a community college located in San Francisco
- De Anza College, a community college located in Cupertino
- Foothill College, a community college located in Mountain View
- Skyline College, a community college located in San Bruno
