= Jeremy Anderson (artist) =

American artist (1921–1982)

Jeremy Radcliffe Anderson
- Born: October 28, 1921; Palo Alto, California, United States
- Died: June 19, 1982 (aged 60); Greenbrae, California, United States
- Education: San Mateo Junior College, California School of Fine Arts
- Occupations: Visual artist, educator
- Known for: Sculpture
- Movement: Abstract art, Funk art
- Spouse: Frances Webster Whitney (m. 1947–1982; his death)
- Children: 3

Jeremy Radcliffe Anderson (October 10, 1921 – June 19, 1982), was an American artist and educator, known for his wood sculptures. He was an influential mid-century fine art figure in San Francisco, California; and taught classes at San Francisco Art Institute.

== Early life, family, and education ==
Jeremy Radcliffe Anderson was born in 1921 in Palo Alto, California. His father Frederick "Fritz" C. Anderson (1889–1963) was a professor of Romance languages at Stanford University. Anderson graduated from Palo Alto High School. He continued his studied at San Mateo Junior College (now College of San Mateo). Anderson served in the United States Navy aboard the USS Gillis in the Aleutian Islands, during World War II.

In 1947, Anderson married Frances Webster Whitney, from Ross, California and Inverness, California. They had three children.

Anderson graduated from the California School of Fine Arts (later known as San Francisco Art Institute), and studied under Robert Boardman Howard. He was awarded the Rosenberg Traveling Fellowship in 1950, and traveled to France for a year.

== Career ==
In his early career Anderson made abstract sculpture; and in his later career his work started to have figures and humor, possibly a nod to funk art. Anderson was a semi-finalist for public art in the Golden Gateway Project in Marin County in 1961, winning a cash prize.

Anderson taught at San Francisco Art Institute (SFAI). One of his students at SFAI was Louise David Lieber. He was visiting faculty at the University of California, Davis (UC Davis) in 1975.

Anderson was a member of the Marin Society of Artists, and participated in their group exhibitions. He had a retrospective exhibition in 1967 at the San Francisco Museum of Art (now the San Francisco Museum of Modern Art); and solo exhibitions at Braunstein/Quay Gallery (October 1970, and December 1978) in San Francisco.

Anderson believed sculpture was concerned with what he called "everyday mystical experience." In this respect it was like "the contemplation of nature or of a wrestling bout, the experience that comes with boats or sports cars, or gambling, hunting and many similar seemingly irrational pursuits that, once experienced, lead the individual back for more."

== Death and legacy ==
After struggling with cancer, he died on June 19, 1982, at the age of 60 at Marin General Hospital in Greenbrae, California.

His work is included in museum collections, including at the University Art Museum at the University of California, Berkeley; the Pasadena Museum of Modern Art (now Norton Simon Museum, from the Betty and Monte Factor Family Collection), the San Francisco Museum of Modern Art, the Whitney Museum of Art, and the Smithsonian American Art Museum.
