= NCAFC =

NCAFC is a common acronym and may refer to:

== Sport ==
- Newport County A.F.C., a professional football club based in Newport, South Wales
- Newry City A.F.C., a semi-professional football club based in Newry, County Down

== Politics ==
- National Campaign Against Fees, now known as the Student Left Network, a U.K. organisation of activist students and education workers
