= Northern California Football Conference =

American college athletic conference

- Association: California Community College Athletic Association
- Commissioner: Craig Rigsbee
- Sports fielded: American football
- No. of teams: 30
- Region: Northern California
- Website: ncfcfootball.com

The Northern California Football Conference (NCFC) is a college athletic conference that operates under the California Community College Athletic Association (3C2A), the governing body for athletics in California's community college system. The conference organizes college football at the community college level in Northern California.

== Teams ==
=== National Division ===
==== National - Bay 6 ====
- College of San Mateo Bulldogs
- Diablo Valley College Vikings
- City College of San Francisco Rams
- Foothill College Owls
- Laney College Eagles
- San Jose City College Jaguars

==== National - Norcal ====
- Butte College Road Runners
- American River College Beavers
- Sierra College Wolverines
- College of the Redwoods Corsairs
- Shasta College Knights
- Santa Rosa College Bear Cubs

==== National - Valley ====
- Modesto Junior College Pirates
- Fresno City College Rams
- College of the Sequoias Giants
- Monterey Peninsula College Lobos
- Sacramento City College Panthers
- Reedley College Tigers

=== American Division ===
==== American - Golden Coast ====
- De Anza College Mountain Lions
- Coalinga College Falcons
- Merced College Blue Devils
- Hartnell College Panthers
- Cabrillo College Seahawks
- Gavilan College Rams

==== American - Pacific 7 ====
- Feather River College Golden Eagles
- Los Medanos College Mustangs
- College of the Siskiyous Eagles
- San Joaquin Delta College Mustangs
- Contra Costa College Comets
- Chabot College Gladiators
