= Tour de Peninsula =

Non-competitive bicycle ride in California

The Tour de Peninsula (TdP) was a 3, 22, 33, and 65-mile non-competitive bicycle ride that began and ended at Coyote Point Park in San Mateo, California.

Founded in 1995 by Mark Simon and Rick Sutton, the Tour de Peninsula took place every summer from 1995 until 2007. For many years the event was managed by Rohdyco. In 2008 the owners, San Mateo County Parks & Recreation Foundation, did not hold it, but in 2009 the ride resumed with Sutton once again an event director. The Tour de Peninsula was set to go ahead in 2016, however this event was canceled. No race has happened since.

The Tour de Peninsula drew more than 2,000 cyclists and benefited the San Mateo County Parks & Recreation Foundation through cyclist entrance fees. Participants received support along the ride route with water and snacks at rest stops staffed by volunteers, and a Tour de Peninsula "Dirty Shirt" (a T-shirt with fake mud spots on it) when they finished the ride.

While the ride took place, family members who were not on bicycles enjoyed a day in the park at Coyote Point Park where there was a spacious picnic area with inflatable children's games, and an exposition of event sponsors as well as small vendors. Post-ride activities included live music.

The names "Tour de Peninsula" and "Dirty Shirt" were light-hearted references to the competitive Tour de France and its Yellow Jersey, in order to stress the uncompetitive nature of the ride.
