= Julio Bortolazzo =

American administrator (1915–2006)

- Born: 1915; Santa Barbara, California
- Died: 2006 (aged 90–91)
- Education: Santa Barbara High School; Santa Barbara State College
- Occupation: Administrator

Julio Bortolazzo (1915–2006) was an American higher education administrator, and a pioneer in the development of community colleges in California.

Born in 1915 in Santa Barbara, California, he was the son of Italian immigrants Santo and Vittoria Bortolazzo (originally from Crespano del Grappa, Italy). Growing up in a mixed Italian and Hispanic section of Santa Barbara, he spoke Italian and Spanish before he learned English. He attended local public schools and graduated from Santa Barbara High School in 1932. He then attended Santa Barbara State College where he was active in tennis and student life (and won the men's tennis championship at least twice). He also played on the Santa Barbara State College baseball team.

He graduated from Santa Barbara State College in 1936 (and would later be granted an outstanding alumni award in 1967). After graduation, Bortolazzo started teaching as a social studies teacher at Santa Barbara Junior High (where he was remembered as a kind and inspirational teacher). While teaching at the secondary level in Santa Barbara, California, Bortolazzo earned a master's degree in Education from USC in 1939.

James B. Conant, the President of Harvard University, sat in on Bortolazzo's teaching one day at Santa Barbara High School and then offered him a scholarship to pursue doctoral study at Harvard. He paused his doctoral study to serve as a Lieutenant Commander in the US Naval Reserve during World War II. During the war, he was involved in officer education programs. After World War II ended, Bortolazzo returned to Harvard and finished his Ed. D. in 1949, with a dissertation entitled “An evaluation of instructional film usage in United States Navy training activities, other than air, World War II, with implications for post-war civilian education”.

He was then appointed superintendent of the Lake Oswego School District in Oregon in 1950. In 1952, Bortolazzo was appointed President of what was then known as “Stockton College” (a community college in Stockton, California). In 1955, the United States Operation Mission invited Bortolazzo to examine technical schools in Italy.

In 1956, Bortolazzo was appointed President of the College of San Mateo (a community college in San Mateo, California) which he would lead from 1956 to 68. He led the campus through a period of great expansion both in terms of facilities and number of students, thought at times he tangled with trustees and enforced a strict dress code for faculty and students (one trustee called him a “bulldozer with brains”). While President of the College of San Mateo, the US State Department's International Cooperation Administration invited Bortolazzo to Liberia as a consultant for industrial education in 1958. In 1960, Bortolazzo accompanied Harvard President James B. Conant as a consultant to support educational reforms in Italy in 1960. Bortolazzo was instrumental in the creation of two more community colleges in the San Mateo Community College District: Cañada College in Redwood City, California in 1968 and Skyline College in San Bruno, California in 1969.

Bortolazzo then returned to Stockton, California, in 1968, where he served an additional year as president of what was now called San Joaquin Delta College and led a successful bond campaign for 50 million dollars. The tennis courts at the college are named in his honor.

He returned to his native Santa Barbara as president of Santa Barbara City College from 1969 to 1970. He led the campus through infrastructure improvements, including the construction of a tennis facility at the adjoining Pershing Park. Blessed with an intense work ethic (and an early riser), he would come to work by 6 AM and sometimes scheduled telephone calls with faculty union leaders before that.

In 1971, he was appointed Chancellor of the South Carolina Technical College System. He lobbied for a transformation of the technical schools into community colleges from which African Americans would have an opportunity to transfer into the public universities. His tenure there was brief and stormy, and he resigned early.

Bortolazzo returned to Santa Barbara, CA for retirement and helped raise money to rebuild the Santa Barbara Municipal Tennis Stadium, often mentioning that he played the first match ever held in that stadium in 1937. He also played a leading role in the Municipal Unemployed Tennis Seniors group at the Santa Barbara Municipal Tennis Courts.

Dr. Julio Bortolazzo died in 2006.
