= Double House =

Double House may refer to:

== Places ==
- Double House, Utrecht, Netherlands
- McColloch-Weatherhogg Double House, Indiana, United States
- C.H. Baker Double House, Iowa, United States
- Walter M. Bartlett Double House, Iowa, United States
- F.E. Haley Double House, Iowa, United States
- Daniel T. Newcome Double House, Iowa, United States
- Susie P. Turner Double House, Iowa, United States
- Merrill Double House, Massachusetts, United States
- William Shay Double House, New York, United States
- Adams Street Double House, Ohio, United States

== Other ==
- Double House (manga), Japanese manga by Nanae Haruno
- Alternate term for Double monastery

== See also ==
- Duplex (building)
