= 1997 in architecture =

The year 1997 in architecture involved some significant architectural events and new buildings.

== Events ==
- September 26 – An earthquake strikes the Italian regions of Umbria and Marche, causing part of the Basilica of St. Francis at Assisi (constructed 1228–1253) to collapse.

== Buildings and structures ==
=== Buildings ===
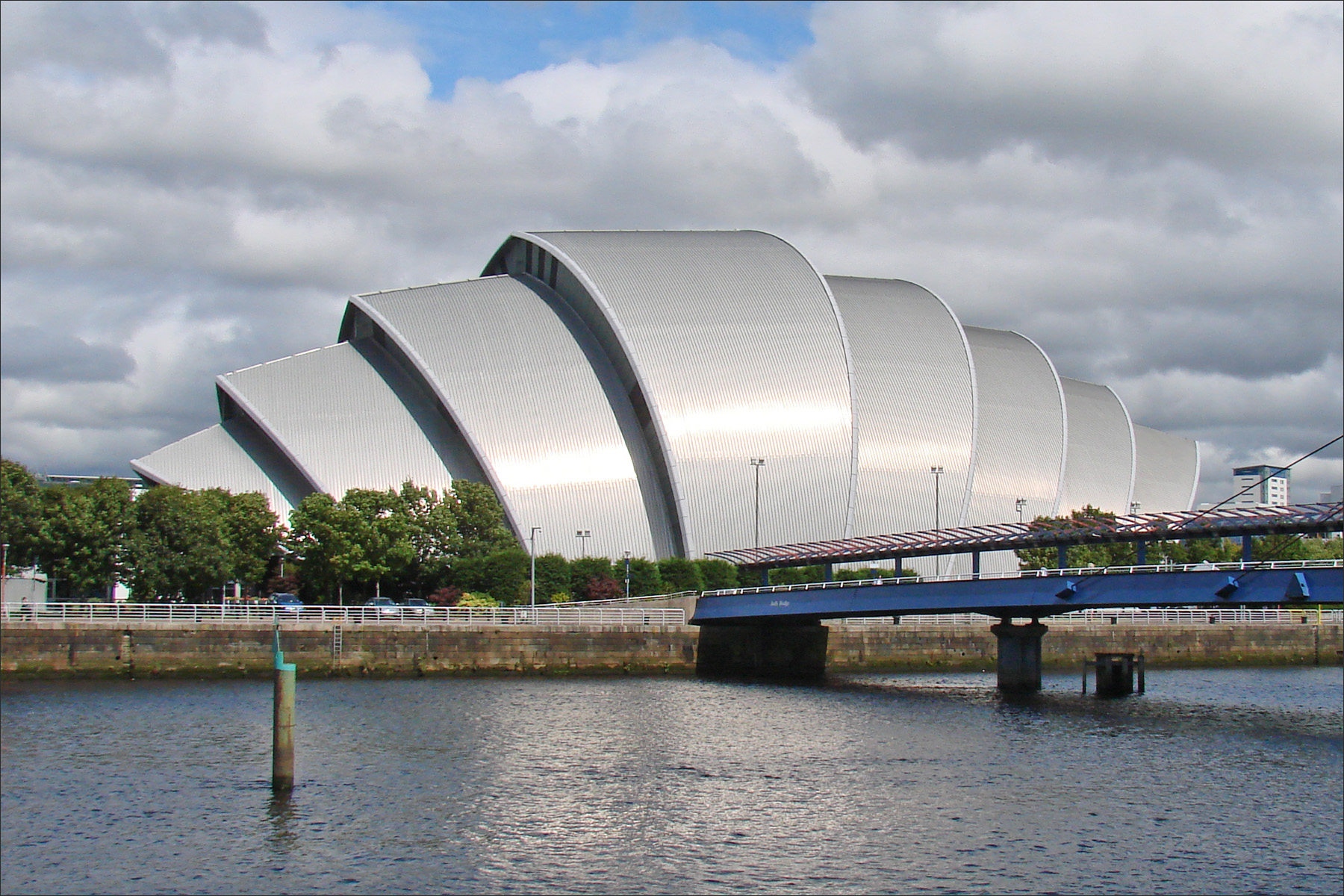
Clyde Auditorium in Glasgow, Scotland

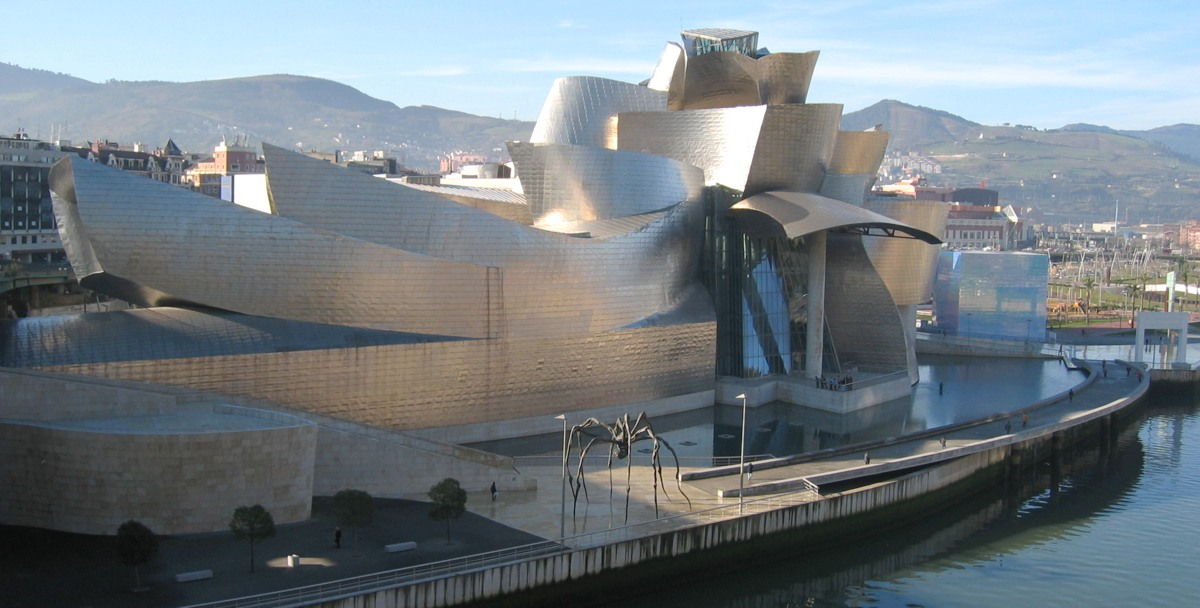
Guggenheim Museum Bilbao

- American Air Museum at the Imperial War Museum Duxford, England, designed by Foster and Partners, is officially opened (Stirling Prize 1998).
- British Library in London, designed by Colin St John Wilson, opens.
- Clyde Auditorium in Glasgow, designed by Foster and Partners, is completed.
- Commerzbank Tower in Frankfurt, designed by Norman Foster, is completed and becomes the tallest building in the European Union (1997–2012).
- The Sky Tower (Auckland) in New Zealand, the tallest free-standing structure in the Southern Hemisphere at 328 m (1,076 ft), designed by Craig Craig Moller Ltd, opens on March 3.
- The T & C Tower in Kaohsiung, Taiwan, designed by C. Y. Lee & Partners and HOK, is completed.
- Getty Center in Los Angeles, designed by Richard Meier.
- Shakespeare's Globe in London, a reconstruction of the Elizabethan Globe Theatre, is officially opened.
- Guggenheim Museum Bilbao, designed by Frank Gehry, opens to the public.
- Petronas Twin Towers in Kuala Lumpur, designed by César Pelli, are completed, constituting the world's tallest building until 2003.
- Fondation Beyeler in Riehen near Basel, Switzerland, designed by Renzo Piano, is opened.
- Kunsthaus Bregenz in Austria, designed by Peter Zumthor, is opened.
- Katuaq cultural centre, Nuuk, Greenland, designed by Schmidt Hammer Lassen Architects, opens on February 15.
- Nubian Museum in Aswan, inaugurated (Aga Khan Award for Architecture 2001)
- Crown Casino in Melbourne, Australia is completed.
- WoZoCo housing in Amsterdam, designed by Jacob and Nathalie de Vries and Winy Maas of MVRDV, is completed.
- Rudin House, Leymen, France, designed by Herzog & de Meuron, is completed.
- Rongomaraeroa, Museum of New Zealand Te Papa Tongarewa, Wellington, designed by Cliff Whiting, is opened.
- Station F at Abbey Mills Pumping Station in London, designed by Allies and Morrison, is completed.
- Refurbishment following 1992 Windsor Castle fire in England, designed by Giles Downes, is completed.

== Awards ==
- AIA Gold Medal – Richard Meier
- Architecture Firm Award – R.M. Kliment & Frances Halsband Architects
- Praemium Imperiale Architecture Laureate – Richard Meier
- Pritzker Prize – Sverre Fehn
- Prix de l'Académie d'Architecture de France – Imre Makovecz
- Prix de l'Équerre d'Argent – Jean-Marc Ibos and Myrto Vitart
- RAIA Gold Medal – Roy Simpson
- RIBA Royal Gold Medal – Tadao Ando
- Stirling Prize – James Stirling, Michael Wilford and Associates for Stuttgart Music School, Germany
- Thomas Jefferson Medal in Architecture – Jaime Lerner
- Twenty-five Year Award – Phillips Exeter Academy Library

== Deaths ==
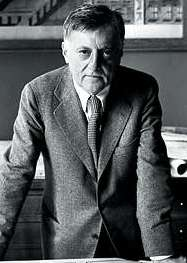
Aldo Rossi

- May 22 – Alziro Bergonzo, Italian architect and painter (born 1906)
- August 8 – Paul Rudolph (born 1918)
- September 4 – Aldo Rossi (born 1931)
