= Mission Rock, San Francisco =

Property development in San Francisco

Mission Rock
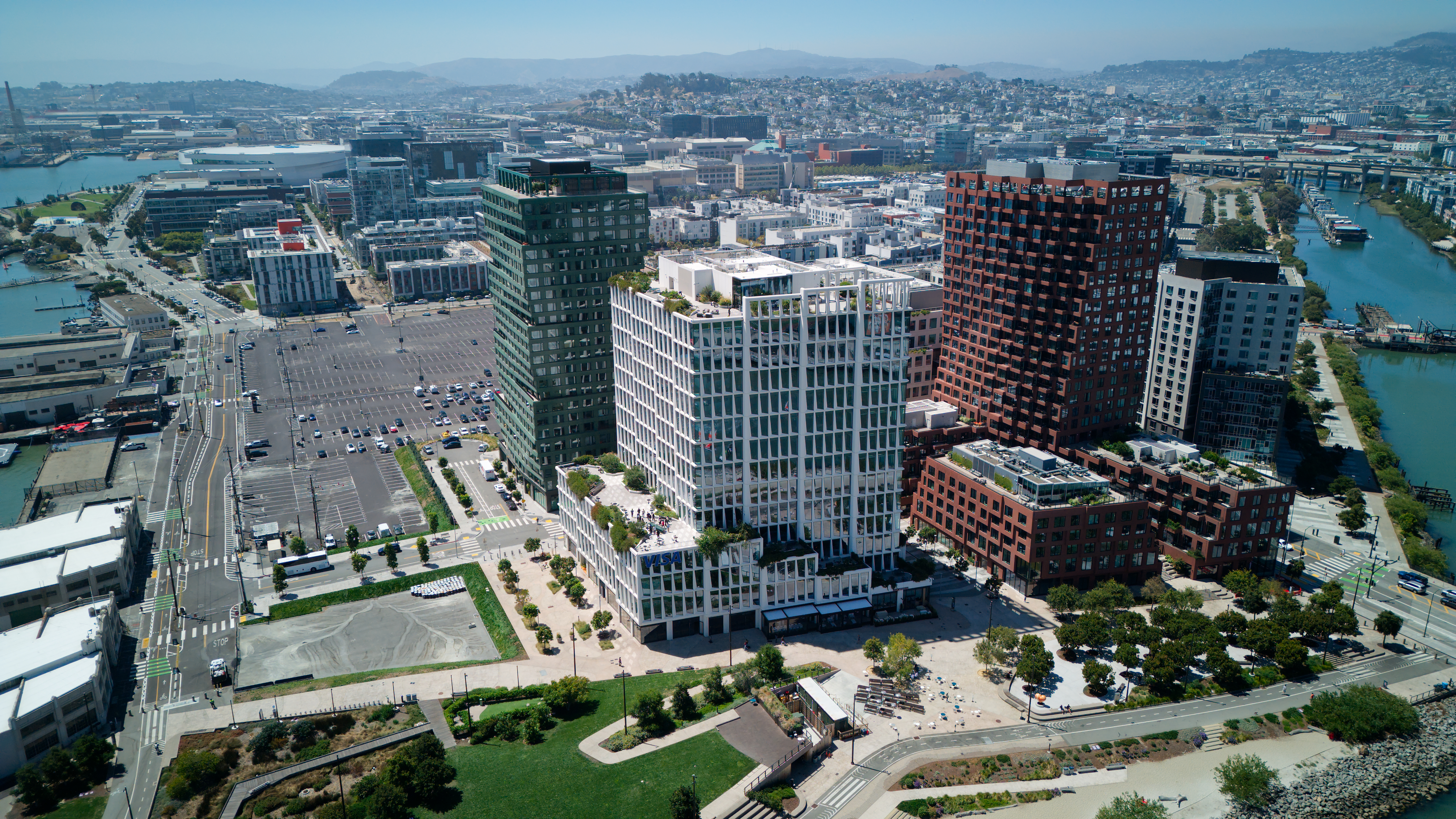
- Aerial photo of Mission Rock in July 2026

Project
- Opening date: June 24, 2024
- Developer: San Francisco Giants; Tishman Speyer
- Website: missionrock.com

Location
- Interactive map of Mission Rock, San Francisco
- Coordinates: 37°46′28″N 122°23′18″W
- Country: United States
- State: California
- City-county: San Francisco

Mission Rock is a mixed-use development in the Mission Bay neighborhood of San Francisco, California.

It is located across McCovey Cove from Oracle Park, and is connected to China Basin Park.

In 2009, the Port of San Francisco chose the San Francisco Giants to develop the land across from their home stadium, Oracle Park. After voters approved the raising of building height limits to allow the development in 2015, the Giants elected Tishman Speyer to co-develop the project in 2018. The Canyon, the development's first residential building, was designed by MVRDV and was completed in 2024. The building's opening ceremony on June 24, 2024, marked the official opening of Mission Rock.

In addition to apartment complexes, Mission Rock is home to a collection of restaurants, including Flour + Water Pizzeria, Arsicault Bakery, and a Blue Bottle Coffee location.
