= The Canyon (building) =

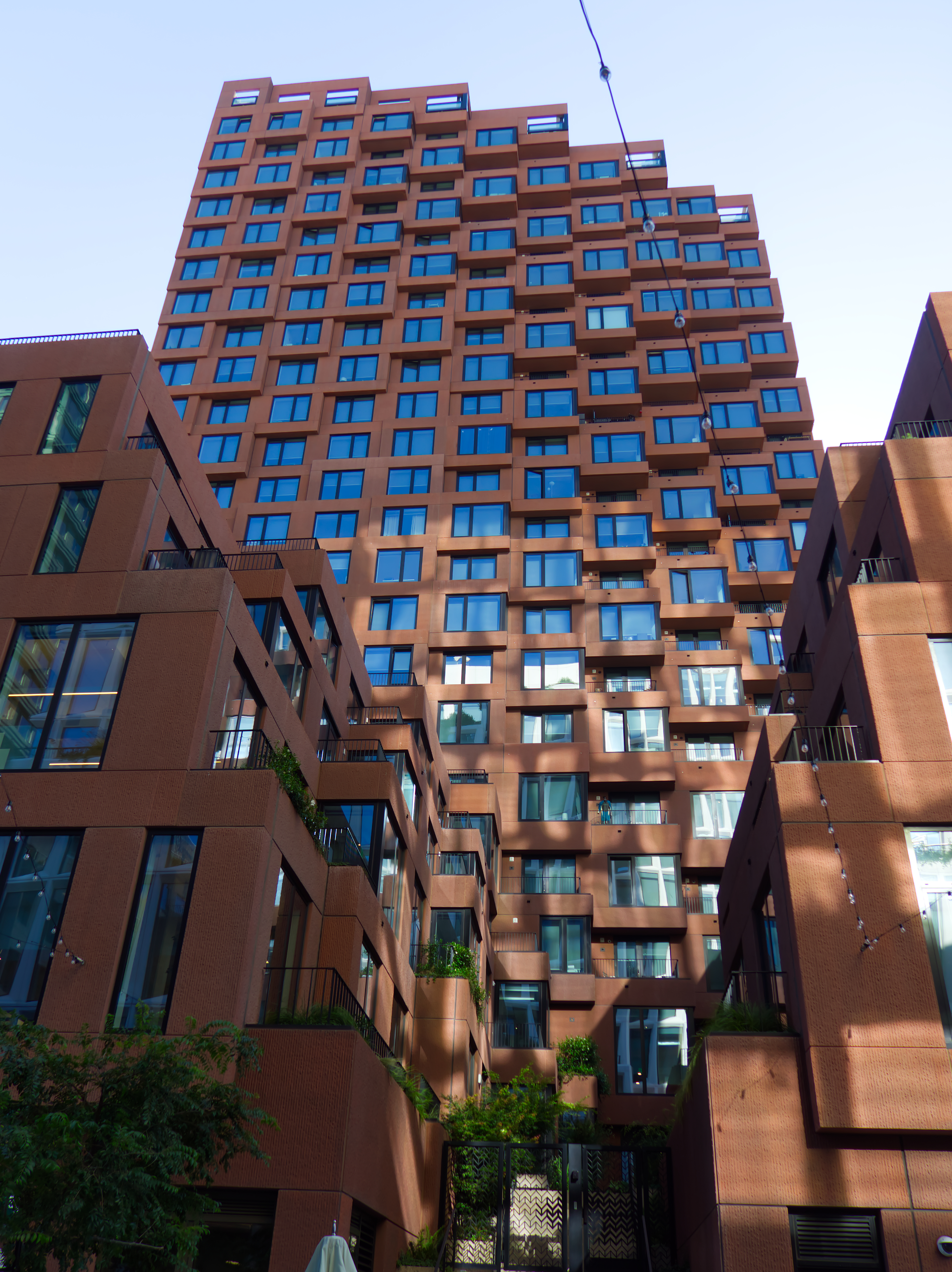
- The Canyon as seen from behind
- Interactive map of the The Canyon area

General information
- Location: 1023 3rd St; San Francisco, California
- Coordinates: 37.775647°N 122.389512°W
- Groundbreaking: December 2020
- Inaugurated: June 23, 2023
- Owner: Mission Rock Partners

Height
- Height: 240 ft (73 m)

Technical details
- Floor count: 23
- Floor area: 380,000 sq ft (35,000 m^{2})

Design and construction
- Architecture firm: MVRDV
- Structural engineer: Magnusson Klemencic Associates
- Other designers: PAE Engineers
- Main contractor: Swinerton Builder

Other information
- Number of units: 283

The Canyon is a 23-story waterfront residential tower in the Mission Rock development of the Mission Bay neighborhood in San Francisco, California. The building's site was previously a parking lot.

== History ==
In October 2019, Netherlands-based designer MVRDV revealed the design renderings for a canyon-like tower to be constructed in San Francisco. Named The Canyon, the building is one of four that form the first phase of the Mission Rock development project, which was joint venture between the San Francisco Giants, Tishman Speyer and the Port of San Francisco. The building was MVRDV's first completed project on the West Coast.

Groundbreaking for the construction began in December 2020 and continued through the COVID-19 pandemic. Construction was complete in early 2023 and an inauguration ceremony occurred on June 21, 2023. The ceremony was attended by Mayor London Breed, San Francisco Giants CEO Larry Baer, Elaine Forbes from the Port of San Francisco, and Carl Shannon from Tishman Speyer. Shannon used his time at the podium to advocate for cutting taxes and fees on development in San Francisco, while Mayor Breed discussed her strategy to meet state-mandated goals regarding increasing housing units.

== Features ==
In view of Oracle Park, The Canyon consists of a 5-story base structure split diagonally and leading to a 23-story tower in the western corner of the plot. The ground floor is dedicated to space for small-scale commercial tenants and the two floors above that are offices. The rest of the building is residential units.

The building showcases several elements of MVRDV's common architectural language, including "village"-making, "pixels", and geology-inspired design. The façade is rugged, textured, and colored a distinct red-brown. The tower walls include jagged step-backs and overhangs, creating the illusion of steep rocky cliffs. Parts of the lower roof are landscaped to create communal spaces for residents.
