= Double House, Utrecht =

House in Utrecht, overlooking parkland

Coordinates: 52°05′07″N 5°08′23″E

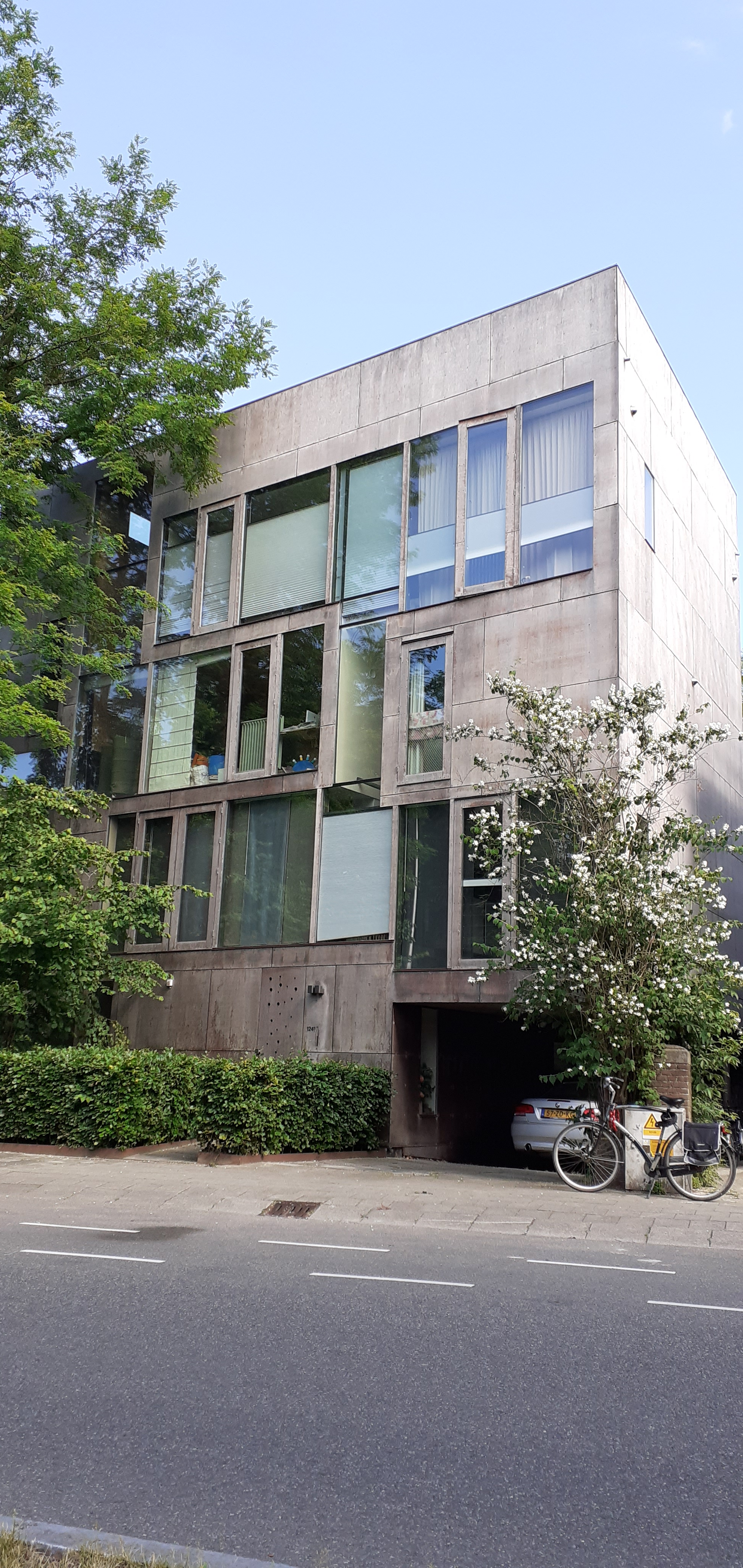
The building in the Koningslaan 124/B

The Double House is a house located in Utrecht, Netherlands. It was designed by Bjarne Mastenbroek and Winy Maas of MVRDV in 1997. The Koek Family bought a large piece of land that overlooked a beautiful park, the Wilhelminapark, but soon found out that they could not afford to build a house to satisfy such a great piece of land. They realized that with the joint income of two families, the house could reach its true potential, so the Koek family joined with the Wesseling family. Bjarne Mastenbroek was given the task of fitting the two families into one structure, and divide views close to equally, while the original buyers would get two thirds of the space and the new buyers would get one third of the space. The project size ended up being 300 square metres (3,200 sq ft).

== Architecture ==
The ownership of the house had to be split between the two families, but the families couldn’t decide who would get better views, better entrances and so on. So Bjarne Mastenbroek and Winy Maas developed an interlocking system for the architecture to make it feel like they had a lot of space. The architecture pushes and pulls at each floor, taking space away at one point, then regaining it the next floor. The parting wall slithers through the two spaces in a zig zag pattern. A straight wall could not be used because it would create very narrow spaces, that would not give the views that the beautiful park could provide. Theoretically the parting wall was a great idea, though caused major building problems. The two architects worked through this problem though, even without any interior columns. They used steel trusses and props, that they hid in the internal and exterior walls. Even with the structural problems they managed to put huge glass windows for the views. The outside panelling of just plywood has been debated on the reason that material was chosen. Some say that it was used to emphasize the abstract box of the building, and to reject any tectonic expression of structure or construction, and then some say that it was simply because of financial issues. The two families spaces end up being very linear. with one staircase each. The placement of the staircase assures that all living spaces can be reached with the shortest distance from the central plane. This central plane makes it easy to communicate from one living space to the next., also this linear movement, along with a long, but slender house let a lot of daylight flood the house. making the house slim allowed for a larger garden in the back to be shared by the two families.

== Site ==
The architecture is located in between nearby Wilhelminapark and a river. Both sides of the house had to be covered in glass to reach the sites potential. The park has a lake and a lot of green, and is a large part of the community. Though Utrecht is a large city, it still has many parks. It hosted a National Concert in 2011 on 12 June, that included eighteen members of the Royal Concertgebouw Orchestra, harpist Lavinia Meijer, and soul singer Giovanca. The city’s population was reduced significantly in the 1870s and people started to live closer together. That is why in the city the people live so close together, and ultimately why the double house is designed the way it was.

== University study ==
The architecture has been used as a world wide example of how do a double family housing strategy. Some universities such as Northeastern University in Boston, MA have had their students study the architecture.
