= Mission Bay, San Francisco =

Mission Bay
- Neighborhood
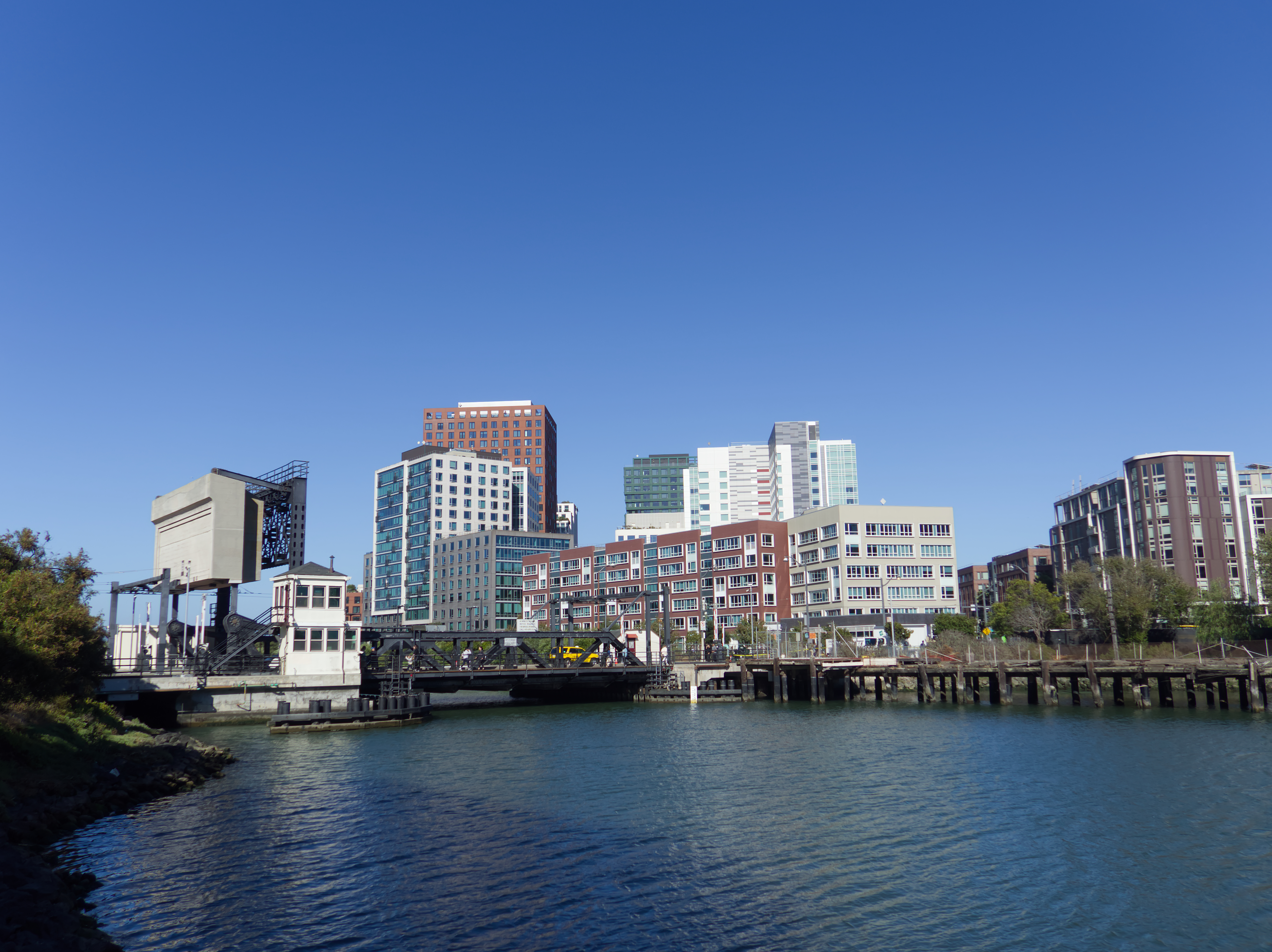
- The historic 4th Street Bridge crosses Mission Creek in Mission Bay

- Location within Central San Francisco
- Coordinates: 37.77018°N 122.39091°W
- Country: United States
- State: California
- City-county: San Francisco

Government
  - Supervisor: Matt Dorsey
  - State Assembly: Matt Haney (D)
  - State Senator: Scott Wiener (D)
  - U. S. Rep.: Nancy Pelosi (D)

Area
  - Total: 0.472 sq mi (1.22 km^{2})

Population
  - Total: 5,390
  - Density: 11,400/sq mi (4,410/km^{2})
- Time zone: UTC-8 (Pacific)
  - Summer (DST): UTC-7 (PDT)
- ZIP codes: 94158, 94107
- Area codes: 415/628

Mission Bay is a 303-acre (123 ha) neighborhood on the east side of San Francisco, California. It is bordered by China Basin to the north, Dogpatch to the south, and San Francisco Bay to the east. Originally an industrial district built on reclaimed land, it was transformed beginning in the late 1990s through the creation of the UCSF Mission Bay campus and large-scale mixed-use development. Mission Bay is now a major center for biotechnology, research, sports, and corporate offices, home to the Chase Center arena, Uber Technologies’ global headquarters, Visa Inc.’s headquarters at the Mission Rock development, and OpenAI’s offices. The neighborhood also features new waterfront parks including China Basin Park and Bayfront Park, along with a growing residential community of condominiums and apartments.

== Location ==
Mission Bay is bounded by Townsend Street on the north, Third Street and San Francisco Bay on the east, Mariposa Street on the south, and 7th Street and Interstate 280 on the west.

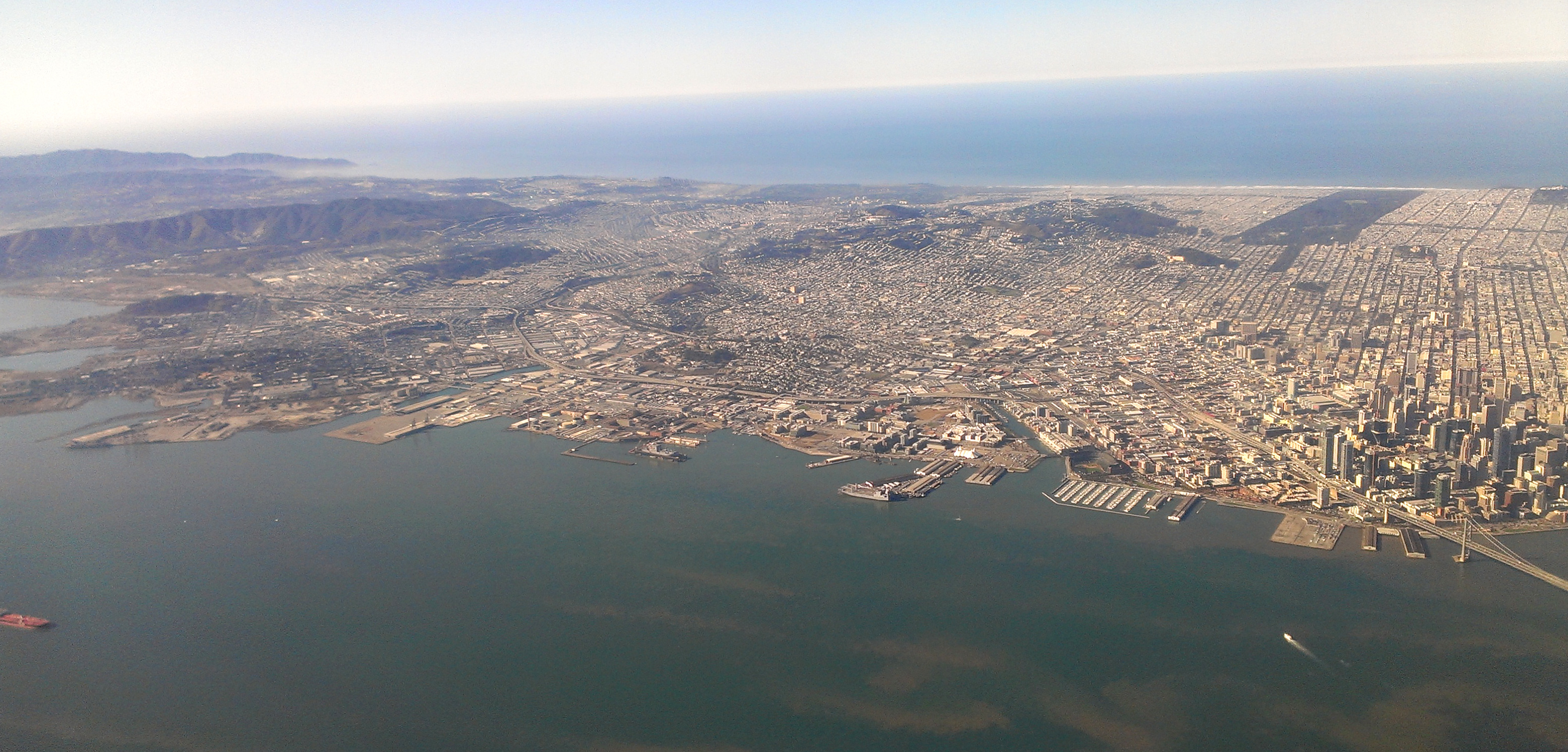
View of San Francisco from the east. Mission Bay is in the lower center.

== History ==
Before urbanization, the water body Mission Bay was nestled inside of a +500 acre salt marsh and lagoon, and was occupied by year-round tidal waters. This area was a natural habitat and refuge for large water fowl populations that included ducks, geese, herons, egrets, ospreys and gulls. The Native American tribes who resided in this area were the Costanoan people who spoke eight different languages which delineated between the various tribelets. The tribe most prevalent in the Bay area was the Patwin people who resided in the area for over 5,000 years.

Beginning in the mid-1800s, Mission Bay was used as a convenient place to deposit refuse from building projects. It was later used as a dumping ground for debris from the 1906 earthquake. As the marsh stabilized with the weight of the infill, the area quickly became an industrial district. By 1850, the area was used for shipbuilding and repair, butchery and meat production, and oyster and clam fishing. With the addition of the railroad, Mission Bay became the home to shipyards, canneries, a sugar refinery and various warehouses.

In 1998, the area was announced by the Board of Supervisors as a redevelopment project through the San Francisco Redevelopment Agency. Much of the land had long been a railyard of the Southern Pacific Railroad Company, and was transferred to Catellus Development Corporation when it was spun off as part of the aborted merger of Southern Pacific and the Santa Fe Railway. Catellus subsequently sold or sub-contracted several parcels to other developers. Another large parcel was the H&H Ship Service Facility of the Port of San Francisco, a toxic and hazardous materials site that had been ordered closed under the Resource Conservation and Recovery Act. It has rapidly evolved into a wealthy neighborhood of luxury condominiums, hospitals, and biotechnology research and development. From 2010 to 2020, Mission Bay's population increased by over 200%.

== Attractions and characteristics ==
Mission Bay was the original headquarters of the California Institute for Regenerative Medicine prior to the organization's move to Oakland. It is home to several major corporate headquarters and offices, including Uber Technologies’ global headquarters at 1725 Third Street adjacent to the Chase Center, Visa Inc.’s new global headquarters at 300 Toni Stone Crossing within the Mission Rock development, and OpenAI’s offices, which occupy part of Uber’s former Mission Bay campus at 1455 Third Street.

The Chase Center, which opened in 2019, serves as the home arena for the Golden State Warriors of the National Basketball Association and the Golden State Valkyries of the WNBA.

- The northern terminus of the Third Street Light Rail Project of the San Francisco Municipal Railway.
- The northern terminus of Caltrain.
- An AT&T Fiber to the premises greenfield project.
- The first new branch of the San Francisco Public Library in over 40 years, The Mission Bay Branch Library, opened on July 8, 2006. It is located on the ground floor of a new multi-use facility, which includes an adult day health center, affordable senior housing, retail space and a large community meeting room. The new library is approximately 7,500 square feet (700 m^{2}), and is the 27th branch of the San Francisco Public Library.
- 455 Mission Bay Boulevard South, originally planned to be the headquarters of Pfizer's Biotherapeutics and Bioinnovation Center (started construction August 5, 2008), occupied by Nektar Therapeutics in November 2010 as their corporate headquarters. The other half of the building is occupied by Bayer's U.S. Innovation Center.
- Location of the San Francisco Public Safety Building at Third Street and Mission Rock. It includes a Police headquarters, Police Station and Mission Bay Fire Station. Funding for the building was passed with a 79.4 percent positive vote on Proposition B.
- The home of Rock Health, a seed accelerator for digital health startups.
- An estimated 56 biotech companies were clustered in Mission Bay in mid-2010.
- The San Francisco Bay Trail.
- The Blue Greenway waterfront trail.
- Sinking sidewalk on the 1200 block of 4th Street.

Mission Bay is served by the N Judah and T Third Street lines of San Francisco's Muni Metro. The N Judah links the neighborhood to Downtown, BART, Hayes Valley and the Sunset District, and the T Third Street links to downtown, BART, and the Bayview and Visitacion Valley neighborhoods. Several other Muni bus and trolley bus lines link the area to neighborhoods to the north, west and south. The Caltrain commuter rail system connects Mission Bay with San Jose and Gilroy. The Central Subway project linking Mission Bay to San Francisco Downtown and Chinatown opened in November 2022.

Although near to and often associated with Oracle Park, the ballpark is in the adjacent South Beach neighborhood. UCSF has built a new 289-bed hospital serving children, women, and cancer patients which opened in February 2015. Construction of the hospital began in October 2010.

Mission Bay has a large residential component with approximately 6,404 apartments and/or condos planned (1,806 of them to be designated affordable).

- The Beacon is one of the largest condominium complexes in San Francisco and anchors much of the activity in North Mission Bay. With 595 condominium units, it sits on a full city block bounded by Townsend to the north, King to the south and 3rd and 4th Streets. The building's name refers to its being the first large scale mixed-use project planned for the new neighborhood, and thus "beacon" of the area's revival.
- Madrone is a high-end residential condominium developed by Bosa Development Corporation. Overlooking San Francisco Bay, the building has two towers with 329 modern residences, many with bay, city and Bay Bridge views. Sales and marketing firm The Mark Company achieved ongoing sales of 20 units per month in 2012 for Madrone, despite a still recovering economy. The building went to market in 2011, and more than 200 residences were sold by August 2012, making it one of San Francisco's most successful projects in more than a decade.
- Glassworks is a mixed-use building with approximately 40 modern condos of varying floor plans and sizes, located directly across Oracle Park at 3rd Street, between King and Berry Streets.
- Signature Properties has built two mid-rise condos on Berry Street: 255 Berry Street and 235 Berry Street. 255 Berry Street was completed in 2004 and 235 Berry Street in 2007. Both buildings sit between Berry Street and Mission Creek and consist mainly or two-bedroom units of various sizes and floor plans. The first floors contain townhome style condos. Units facing south have views of the creek and South Mission Bay.
- Arterra is San Francisco's first LEED-certified market-rate condominium building, located on Fifth Street, between Berry and King Streets (300 and 325 Berry Street). The project consists of three connected buildings, each in a different exterior color: "City" (nine stories), "Park" (six stories) and "Sky" (16 stories). There are a total of 268 condos in the complex.
- Park Terrace (325 Berry Street) is similar in construction to both 255 Berry Street and 235 Berry Street in style and height (nine-story mid-rise). The building has 110 market rate homes.
- Radiance at Mission Bay is in the south part of Mission Bay, adjacent to the Bay. It consists of 99 market rate condominiums.
- Strata is a market rate apartment complex near the UCSF campus.
- Arden is a market-rate residential condominium that was developed by Bosa Development Corporation.

Other notable buildings in Mission Bay include The Gladstone Institute and the Mission Bay medical offices of Kaiser Permanente.

=== Parks and open space ===
Mission Bay Parks completed as of fall 2010 include Mission Creek Park, Mission Bay Commons lots on Mission Bay Boulevard between the Radiance and Nektar/Bayer buildings, the 5th Street Plaza, the sports courts, Koret Quad, and early phases of China Basin Park. The park network has since expanded with Bayfront Park, a waterfront green space along Terry A. Francois Boulevard near Chase Center, and a new two- to five-acre China Basin Park at the edge of the Mission Rock development, which opened in 2024. These parks, operated by the Port of San Francisco, form part of the Blue Greenway and the larger Mission Bay Parks system that connects the neighborhood’s open spaces to the waterfront.

Planning has also begun to convert several interim-use parcels in Mission Bay Commons (Parcels P12, P13, and P15)—which currently house amenities such as SPARK Social SF, Parklab Gardens/Stagecoach Greens mini-golf, community gardens, and a soccer/fitness field—into more permanent and integrated open spaces extending the Commons westward. The Mission Bay Future Parks Project, led by OCII, Mission Bay Development Group, and the San Francisco Recreation and Park Department, envisions renovating and unifying these parcels to match the character of existing Commons blocks and improve public access along the neighborhood’s western edge.

== Education ==
The University of California, San Francisco opened its Mission Bay campus in 2015.

Construction of the Mission Bay School, the neighborhood's first public school, was completed in January 2026 is scheduled to open in August of the same year.
