= Susie P. Turner Double House =

Historic house in Iowa, United States

- U.S. National Register of Historic Places
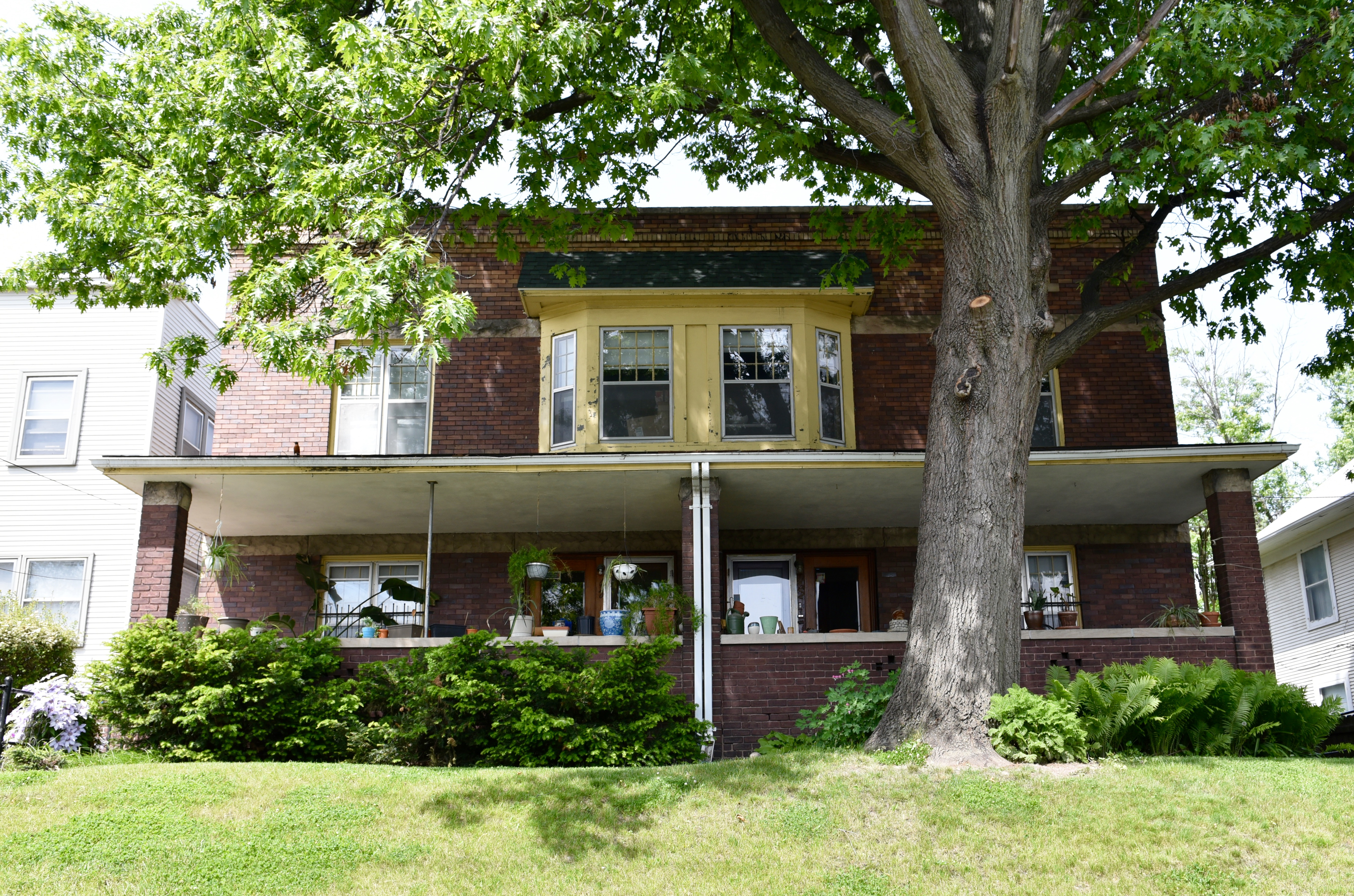

- Location within Iowa Location within the United States
- Location: 1420-1422 8th St. Des Moines, Iowa
- Coordinates: 41°35′49.2″N 93°39′04.7″W
- Area: less than one acre
- Built: 1914
- Built by: James Maine & Sons Company
- Architectural style: Late 19th and Early 20th Century American Movements
- MPS: Towards a Greater Des Moines MPS
- NRHP reference No.: 98001284
- Added to NRHP: October 22, 1998

The Susie P. Turner Double House is a historic building located in Des Moines, Iowa, United States. This two-story duplex features a symmetrical facade, brick in various colors, decorative cast stone, and a fullwidth front porch that is supported by three brick columns. Built in 1914, its significance is its combination of Prairie School architecture and American Craftsman styling. At the time it was constructed the double house was still a somewhat uncommon building type in Des Moines. The house was listed on the National Register of Historic Places in 1998.
