= Walter M. Bartlett Double House =

Historic house in Iowa, United States

- U.S. National Register of Historic Places
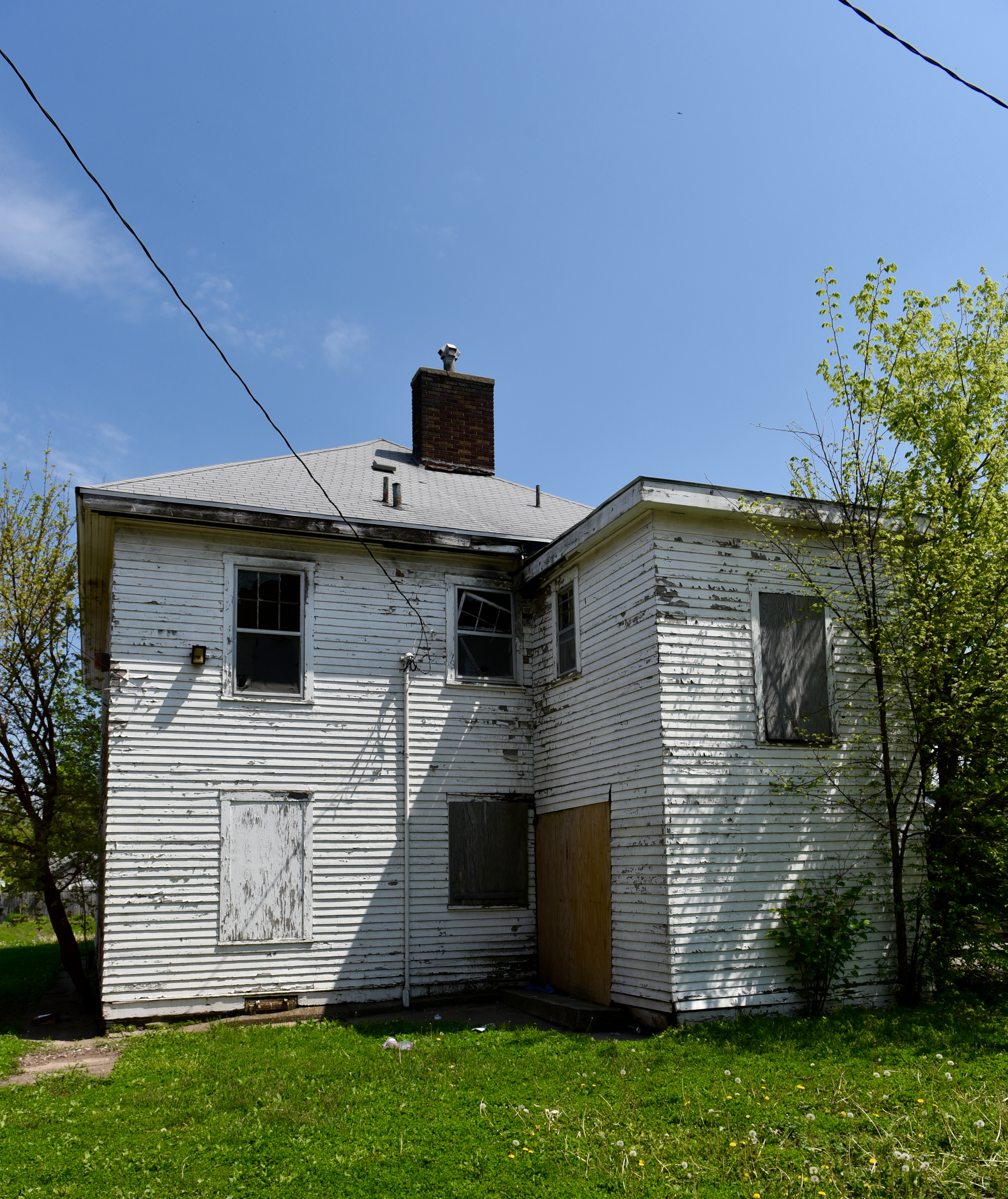
- The back of the house.

- Location within Iowa Location within the United States
- Location: 1416-1418 6th Ave., Des Moines, Iowa
- Coordinates: 41°36′16.7″N 93°37′34″W
- Area: less than one acre
- Built: 1913
- Architectural style: Classical Revival
- MPS: Towards a Greater Des Moines MPS
- NRHP reference No.: 98001279
- Added to NRHP: October 22, 1998

The Walter M. Bartlett Double House is a historic building located in Des Moines, Iowa, United States. Built in 1913, the two-story structure features balloon frame construction. The Neoclassical style building originally had a large portico on the main facade that has been covered over. The window in the pediment is still visible. In addition to its architecture, its significance is attributed to its location on the Sixth Avenue streetcar route. It was part of the development of the area from single-family dwellings to denser residential use. It is also a subtype of the double house called a "two-unit flat", also known as a "double-decker." The house was listed on the National Register of Historic Places in 1998. This house was torn down in 2018.

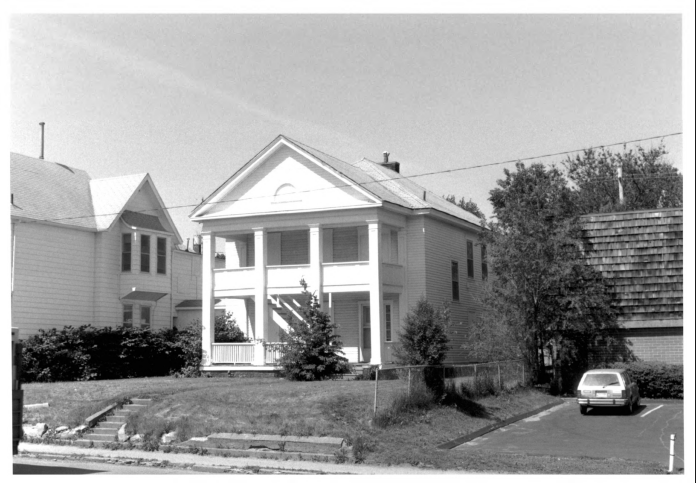
National Historic Asset Photo, shows the original front with pillars

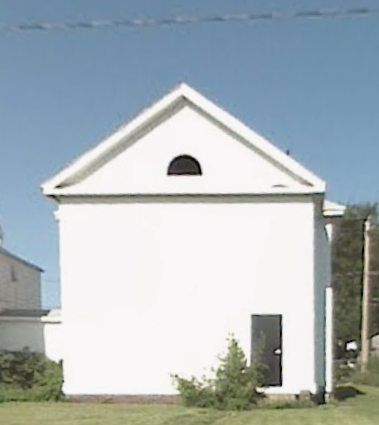
Photo of the house taken in 2006 showing original pillars being covered.

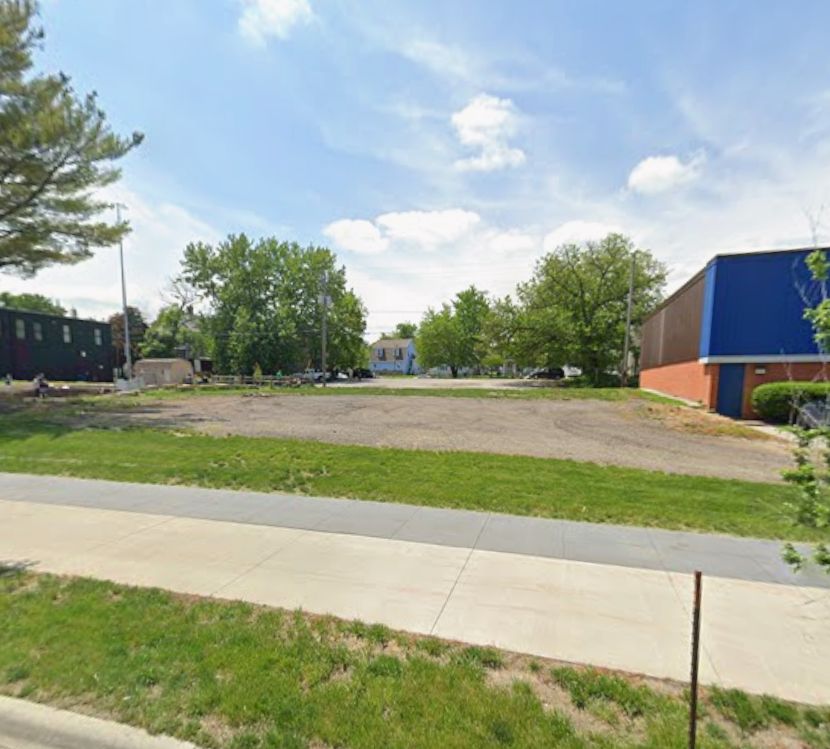
Current location where house once stood
