= China Basin Park =

Municipal park in San Francisco, California

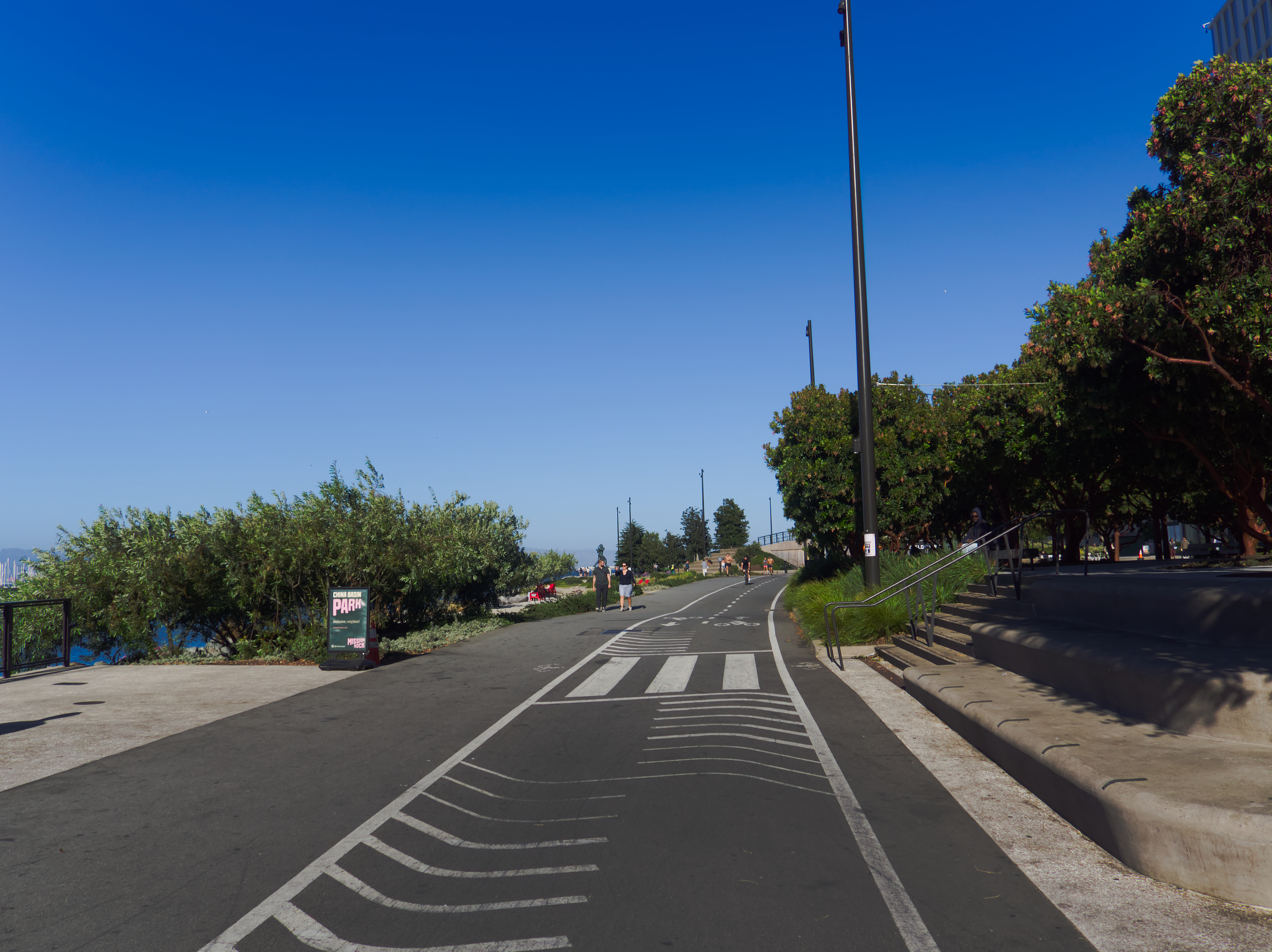
- Interactive map of China Basin Park
- Type: Municipal
- Location: San Francisco, California
- Coordinates: 37.77638°N 122.38801°W
- Area: 5 acres (2.0 ha)
- Established: April 25, 2024; 2 years ago
- Operator: Port of San Francisco

China Basin Park is a 5-acre (2.0 ha) park in San Francisco, California, located at the mouth of Mission Creek in the Mission Bay neighborhood and across from the Oracle Park baseball stadium. The park features a hilly lawn, dog run, artificial beach, amphitheater seating, and a statue of Willie McCovey. A section of the Bay Trail runs through it.

The park is not operated by the San Francisco Recreation & Parks Department but rather falls under the jurisdiction of the Port of San Francisco. After 15 years of planning in conjunction with the Mission Rock development, the park opened to the public before the San Francisco Giants' home opening game on April 5, 2024, and had an official grand opening several weeks later on April 25.
