= Adams Street Double House =

Historic house in Ohio, United States

- U.S. National Register of Historic Places
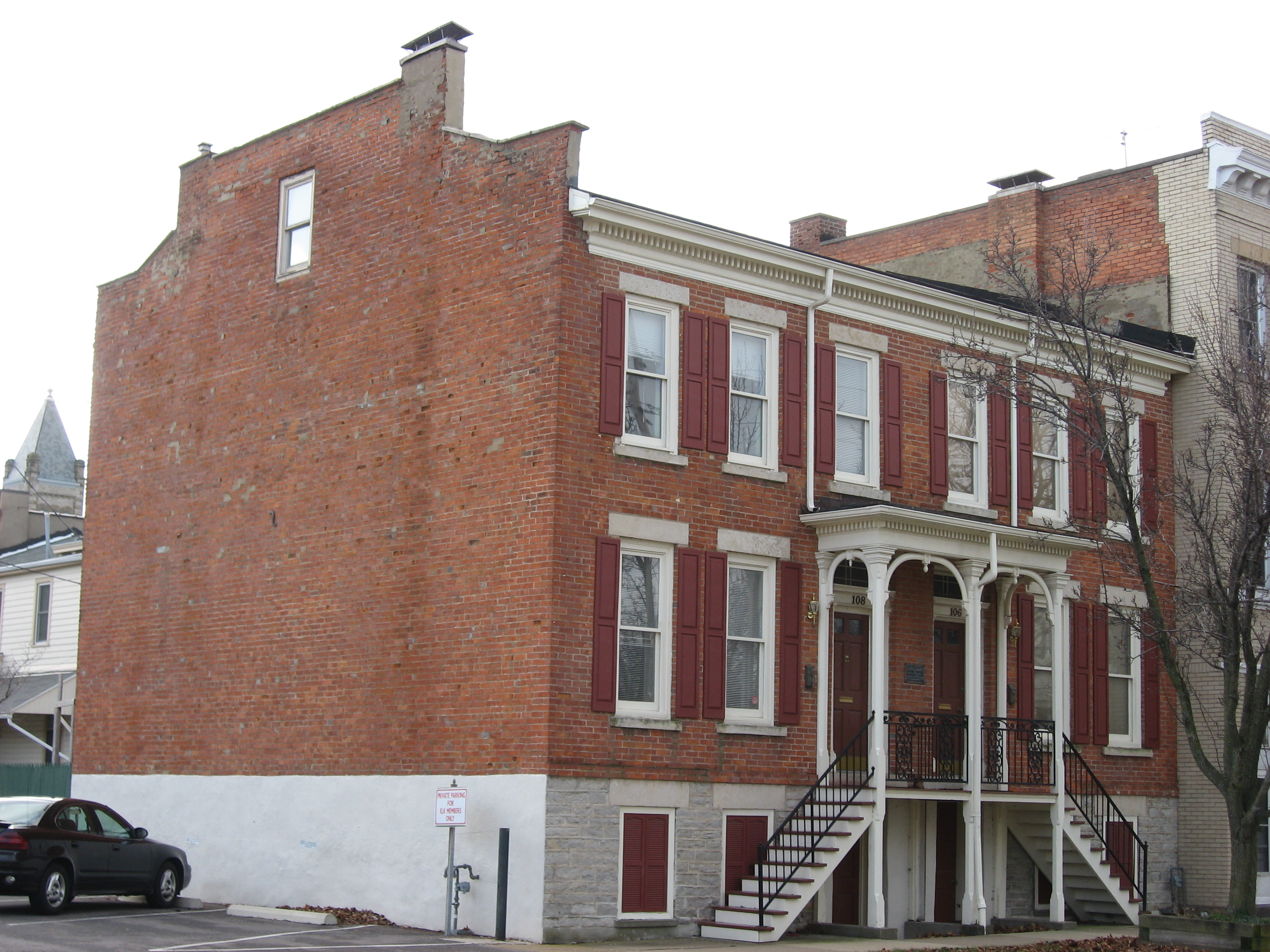

- Location within Ohio Location within the United States
- Location: 106-108 E. Adams Street, Sandusky, Ohio
- Coordinates: 41°27′13″N 82°42′35″W
- Area: Less than 1 acre (0.40 ha)
- Built: c. 1845
- Architectural style: Federal and Greek Revival
- NRHP reference No.: 75001384
- Added to NRHP: October 10, 1975

The Adams Street Double House is a historic double house located at 106-108 East Adams Street in Sandusky, Ohio.

== Description and history ==
The 3 1/2-story, masonry and stone structure was built in about 1845 in the Exotic Revival and Federal styles of architecture. Historically, it has been used as two respective houses, with each house functioning as a single family dwelling.

It was listed in the National Register of Historic Places on October 10, 1975.
