= F.E. Haley Double House =

Historic building in Des Moines, Iowa, United States

- U.S. National Register of Historic Places
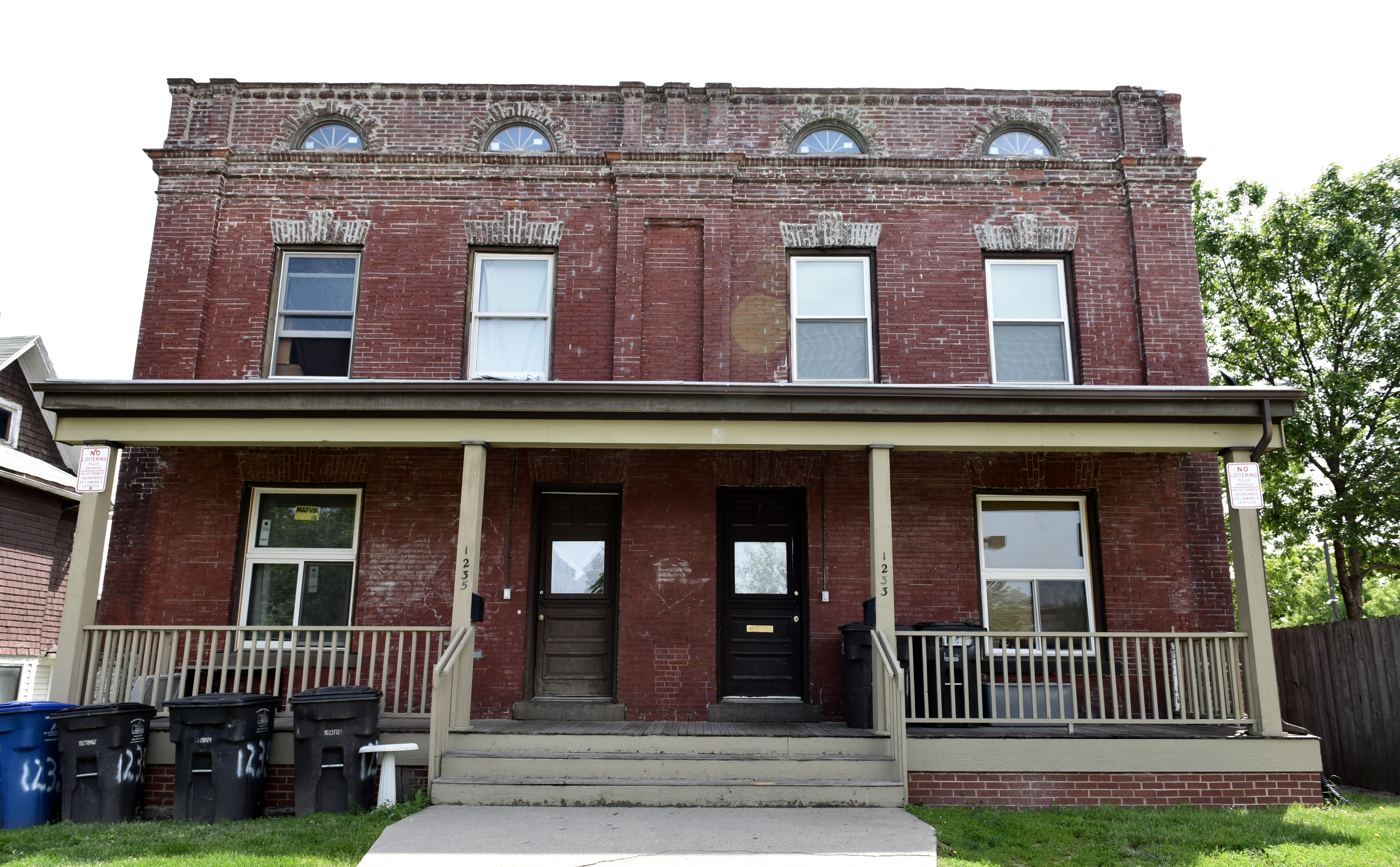

- Location within Iowa Location within the United States
- Location: 1233-1235 7th St. Des Moines, Iowa
- Coordinates: 41°36′06.2″N 93°37′36″W
- Area: less than one acre
- Built: 1897
- Architect: Smith & Gutterson
- Architectural style: Colonial Revival
- MPS: Towards a Greater Des Moines MPS
- NRHP reference No.: 98001278
- Added to NRHP: October 22, 1998

The F.E. Haley Double House, also known as the Gordon Apartments, is a historic building located in Des Moines, Iowa, United States. It is notable as one of the earliest examples of a double house constructed in the area. The housing type became more common during the Victorian era.

Built in 1897, this 2½-story brick Colonial Revival was developed by Felix E. Haley, who managed the property but did not reside in it, indicating its intended use as a rental or investment property. The building features a symmetrical facade, brick in several colors and textures, and a sloping flat roof. While it originally had a full-length front porch, this one is not the original. The four lunette-shaped windows in the frieze feature shield-shaped panes. The house was listed on the National Register of Historic Places in 1998.
