= Jacob van Rijs =

Dutch architect (born 1964)

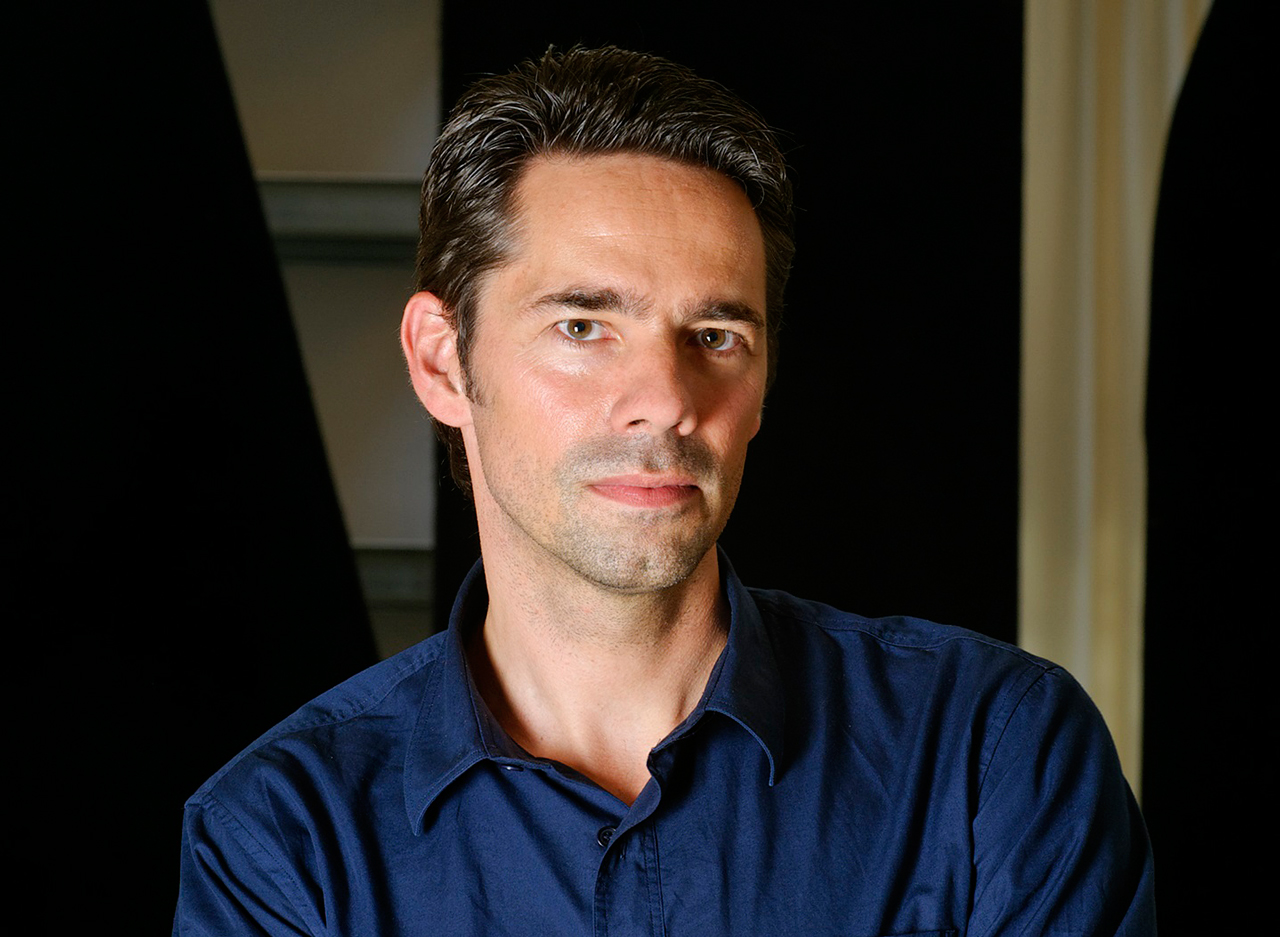
- Jacob van Rijs in 2016
- Born: Jacob van Rijs; 24 August 1964 (age 62); Amsterdam, Netherlands
- Education: Technical University Delft with honours
- Occupations: Architect; Urbanist
- Awards: RIBA International Fellowship (2011)
- Practice: MVRDV
- Buildings: Hannover Expo 2000 Villa VPRO; WoZoCo; Parkrand; Mirador; Ragnarock; Flower Building; Crystal Houses Market Hall
- Projects: KM3; Farmax

Jacob van Rijs Ir. FRIBA (Amsterdam, 1964) is a Dutch architect, urban planner and one of MVRDV’s three founding partners. Besides giving lectures worldwide van Rijs is also professor Entwerfen und Baukonstruktion at Technische Universität Berlin. Moreover, he regularly lectures and takes part in student juriesat universities and institutes worldwide. His teaching experience comprehends TU Munich, TU Delft, University of Wismar, ETSAM University Madrid, Royal Academy of Arts Copenhagen, Tokyo Institute of Technology and Rice University, Houston, amongst others. Within the Royal Institute of Dutch Architects (BNA) he is chairman of the International Programme, creating a better support and stimulation for Dutch architects in their activities across the border worldwide. He also holds a position in the Dutch Trade and Investment Board (DTIB) from where he represents architects an international trade and investment level.

== Education ==
He completed his studies at the Delft University of Technology. He regularly lectures and teaches at schools and institutions all over the world Delft University of Technology, Architecture Academy Amsterdam, Architecture Academy Rotterdam and, Architectural Association School of Architecture London, Cooper Union New York, Rice University in Texas, TN Probe in Tokyo and Universities of Madrid and Barcelona.

== MVRDV ==
In 1993, together with Winy Maas and Nathalie de Vries, he founded MVRDV (an acronym of the initials of the names of the three founders), which produces designs and studies in the fields of architecture, urban studies and landscape design. The studies on light urbanism for the City of Rotterdam, the headquarters of the Dutch Public Broadcasting Company VPRO and the Wozoco's senior citizens' residences in Amsterdam, which won the A.J. van Eck Prize of the Dutch Architects' Association, have brought MVRDV to the attention of a vast collection of clients, giving the studio international renown. Today, the studio is actively involved in numerous projects in various parts of the world. MVRDV designed the Dutch pavilion for Expo 2000 in Hanover, the Logrono Eco-City in Spain, the Gyre building in Tokyo and many others.

== Publications ==
- FARMAX (010 Publishers, Rotterdam, 1999)
- Metacity/Datatown (010 Publishers, Rotterdam, 1999)
- Reading MVRDV (NAi Publishers, Rotterdam, 2003)
- Spacefighter The evolutionary city game (Actar, Barcelona, 2005)
- KM3 EXCURSIONS ON CAPACITIES (Actar, Barcelona, 2006)
- MVRDV 1997-2002 (El Croquis, Madrid, Spain, 2002)

== Articles ==
- Gonzalo Herrero Delicado. Mirador Building, Madrid, Spain: MVRDV and Blanca Lleó 2005. - Galinsky, 2006
- Orlandoni, Alessandra "Interview with Winy Maas" - The Plan 013, March 2006
- Frey, Darcy "Crowded House" - The New York Times Magazine, June 8, 2008
