= Nathalie de Vries =

Dutch architect, lecturer and urbanist

Nathalie de Vries (born 1965 in Appingedam) is a Dutch architect, lecturer and urbanist. In 1993 together with Winy Maas and Jacob van Rijs she set up MVRDV.

== MVRDV ==
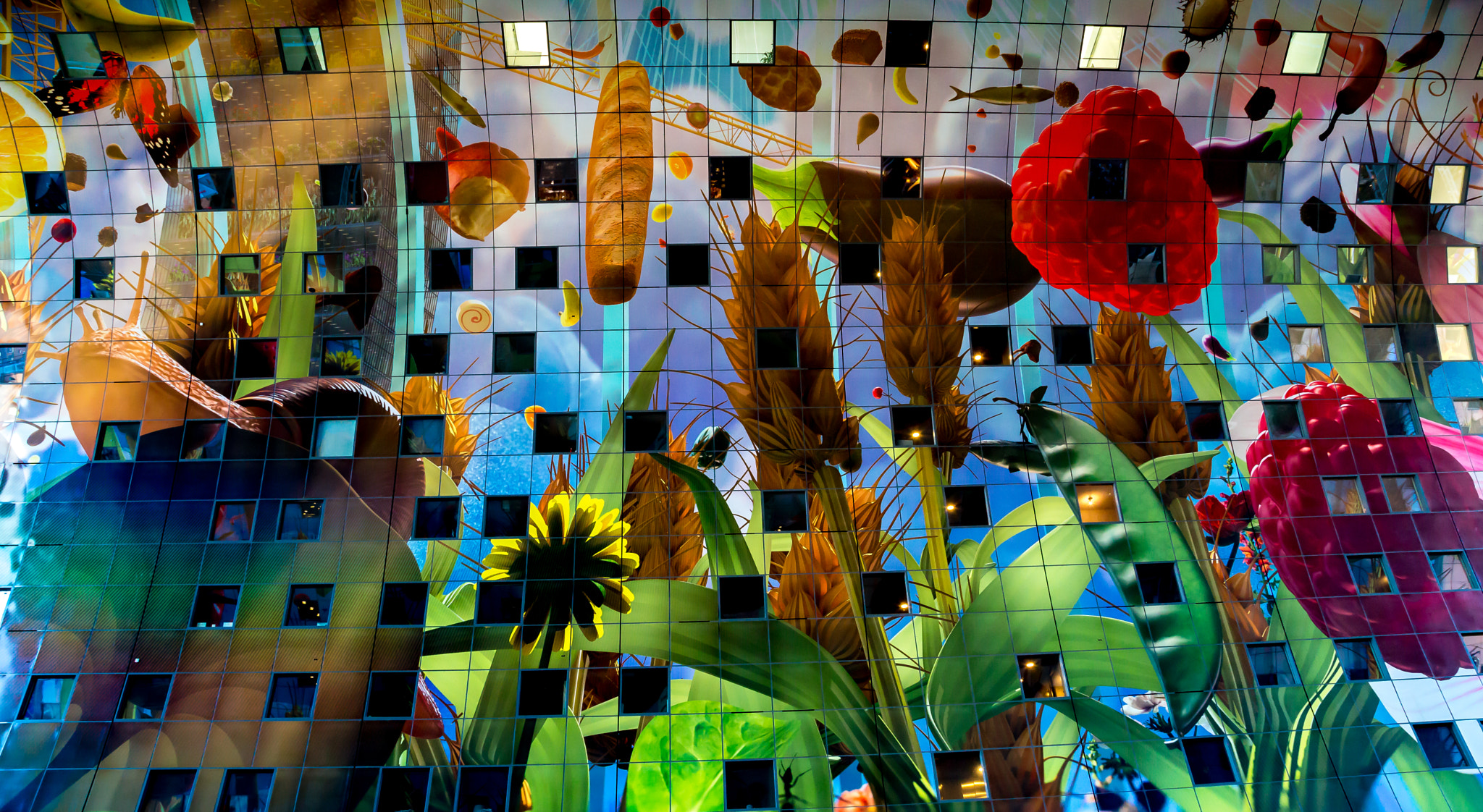
Great Work The Ceiling Of The Market Hall In Rotterdam on which de Vries was co-designer

In 1993, together with Winy Maas and Jacob van Rijs, she founded the MVRDV studio (an acronym of the initials of the names of the three founders), after winning jointly the competition Europan in 1991 with their project Berlin Voids. MvRdV produces designs and studies in the fields of architecture, urban studies and landscape design.

== Publications ==
- FARMAX (010 Publishers, Rotterdam, 1999)
- Metacity/Datatown (010 Publishers, Rotterdam, 1999)
- Reading MVRDV (NAi Publishers, Rotterdam, 2003)
- Spacefighter The evolutionary city game (Actar, Barcelona, 2005)
- KM3 EXCURSIONS ON CAPACITIES (Actar, Barcelona, 2006)
