= Winy Maas =

Dutch architect and educator

Maas, Wilhelmus (Winy)
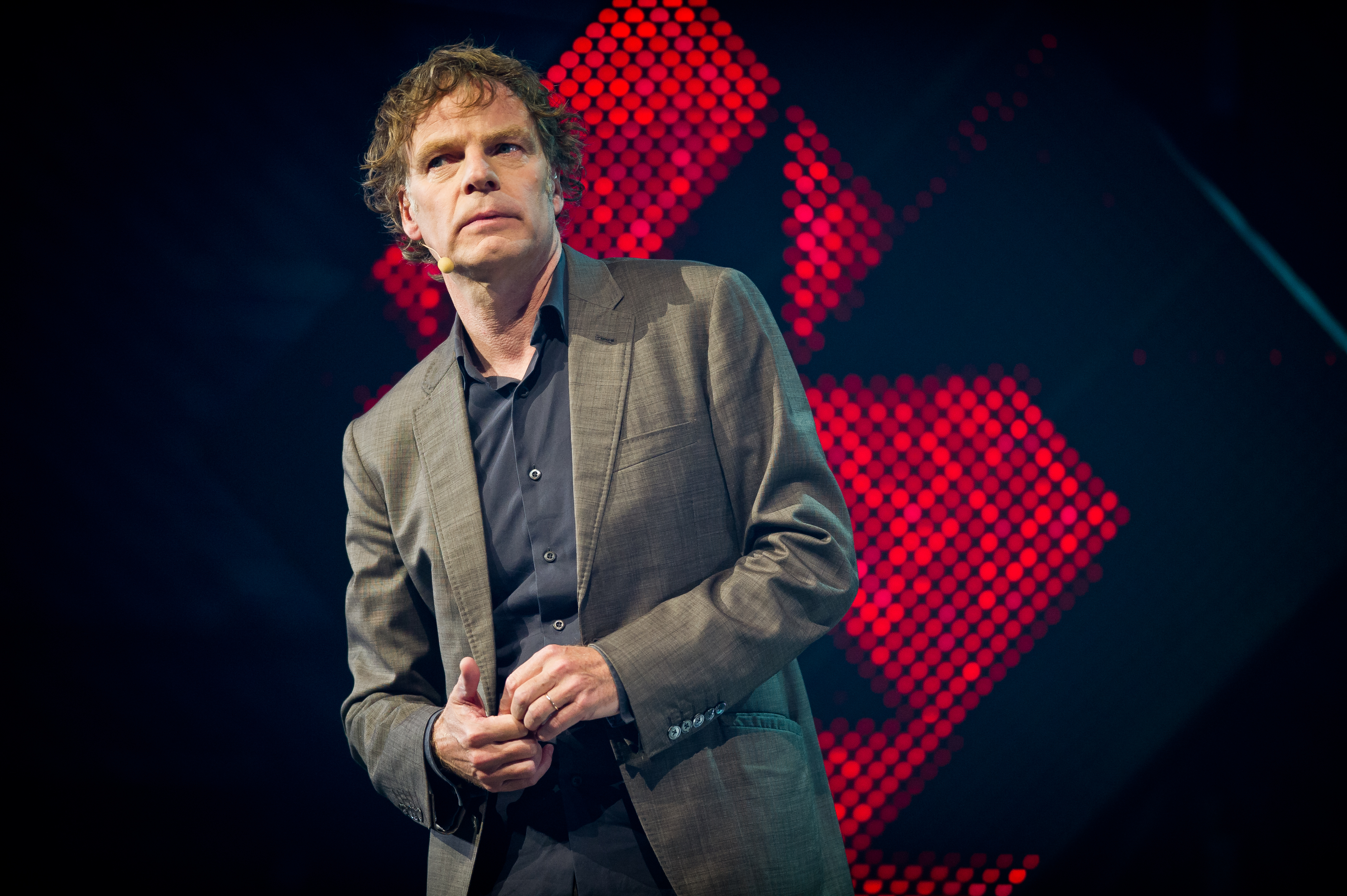
- Winy Maas
- Born: 1959 (age 66–67); Schijndel
- Occupation: Architect
- Practice: MVRDV
- Buildings: EXPO 2000 NL Pavilion

Wilhelmus "Winy" Maas (born 17 January 1959 in Schijndel) is a Dutch architect, landscape architect, professor and urbanist. In 1993 together with Jacob van Rijs and Nathalie de Vries he set up MVRDV.

== Education ==
He completed his studies at the RHSTL Boskoop, graduating as a "landscape architect", and in 1990 he got his degree from the Delft University of Technology. He currently is visiting professor of architectural design at the Massachusetts Institute of Technology and is professor in architecture and urban design at the faculty of architecture, Delft University of Technology. Before this he was professor at among others Berlage Institute, Ohio State and Yale University.

== MVRDV ==
In 1993, together with Jacob van Rijs and Nathalie de Vries, he founded the MVRDV studio (an acronym of the initials of the names of the three founders), which produces designs and studies in the fields of architecture, urban studies and landscape design. The studies on light urbanism for the City of Rotterdam, the headquarters of the Dutch Public Broadcasting Company VPRO and the Wozoco's senior citizens' residences in Amsterdam, which won the J.A. van Eck Prize of the Dutch Architects' Association, have brought MVRDV to the attention of a vast collection of clients, giving the studio international renown. Today, the studio is actively involved in numerous projects in various parts of the world. MVRDV designed the Dutch pavilion for Expo 2000 in Hanover, the Logrono Eco-City in Spain, the Gyre building in Tokyo and many others.

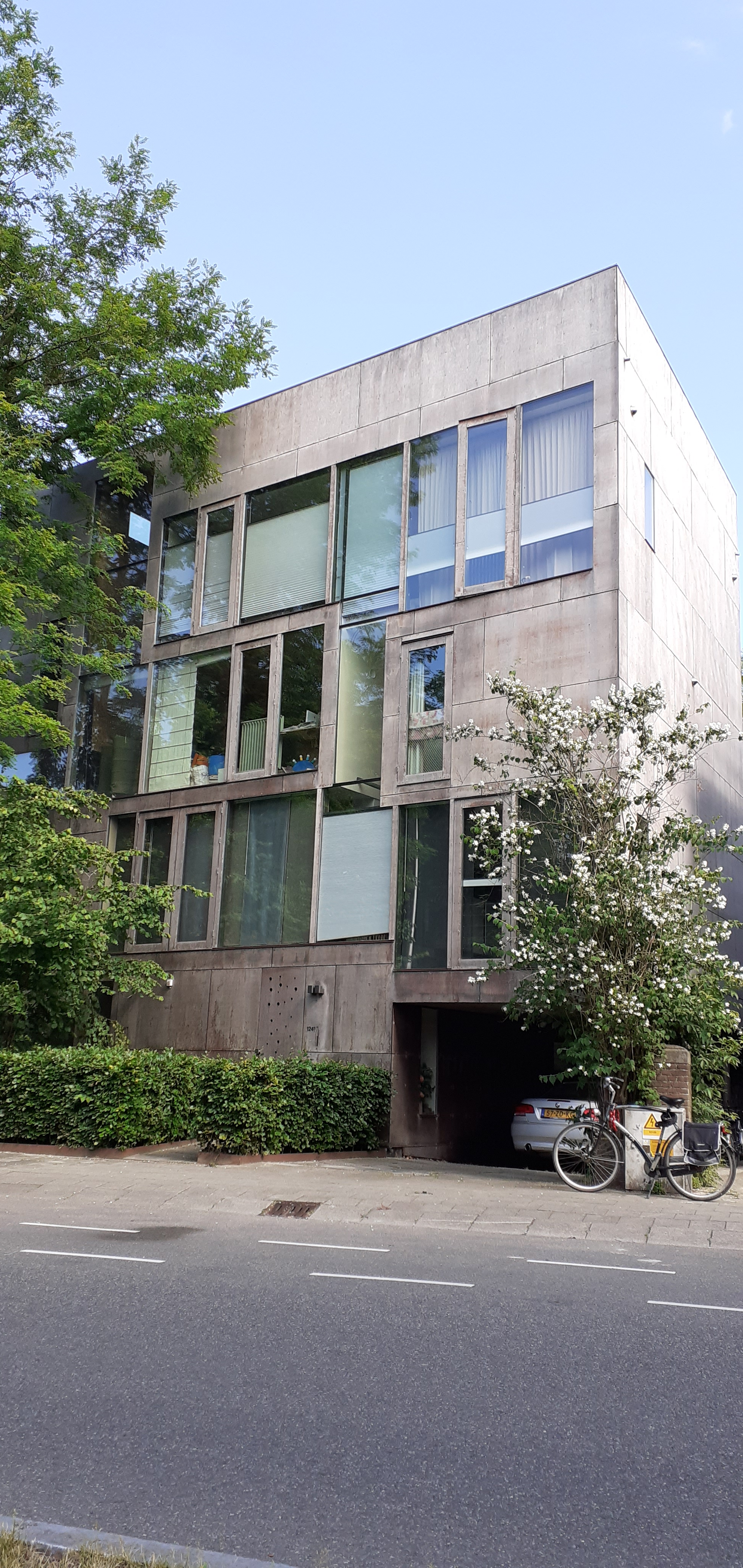
The Dubbele Huis (Double House) in Utrecht

== Other positions ==
Winy Maas presented a keynote address New solutions for new challenges at the inaugural Holcim Forum, “Basic Needs” at the ETH Zurich in 2004. In addition he designs stage sets, objects and was curator of Indesem 2007. He is member of the research board of Berlage Institute Rotterdam, president of the spatial quality board of Rotterdam and supervisor of the Bjørvika urban development in Oslo. He is professor at the Why Factory, a research institute for the future city he founded in 2008 which is part of the Faculty of Architecture of the Delft University of Technology.

== Publications ==
- FARMAX (Ed., 010 Publishers, Rotterdam, 1999) ISBN 978-90-6450-587-4
- Metacity/Datatown (Ed., 010 Publishers, Rotterdam, 1999) ISBN 90-6450-371-0
- Reading MVRDV (NAi Publishers, Rotterdam, 2003) ISBN 978-90-5662-287-9
- Spacefighter The evolutionary city game (Ed., Actar, Barcelona, 2005) ISBN 978-84-96540-73-6
- KM3 Excursions on Capacities (Actar, Barcelona, 2006) ISBN 978-84-95951-85-4
- Skycar City (Actar, Barcelona, 2008) ISBN 978-84-96540-58-3
