= Daniel T. Newcome Double House =

Historic house in Iowa, United States

- U.S. National Register of Historic Places
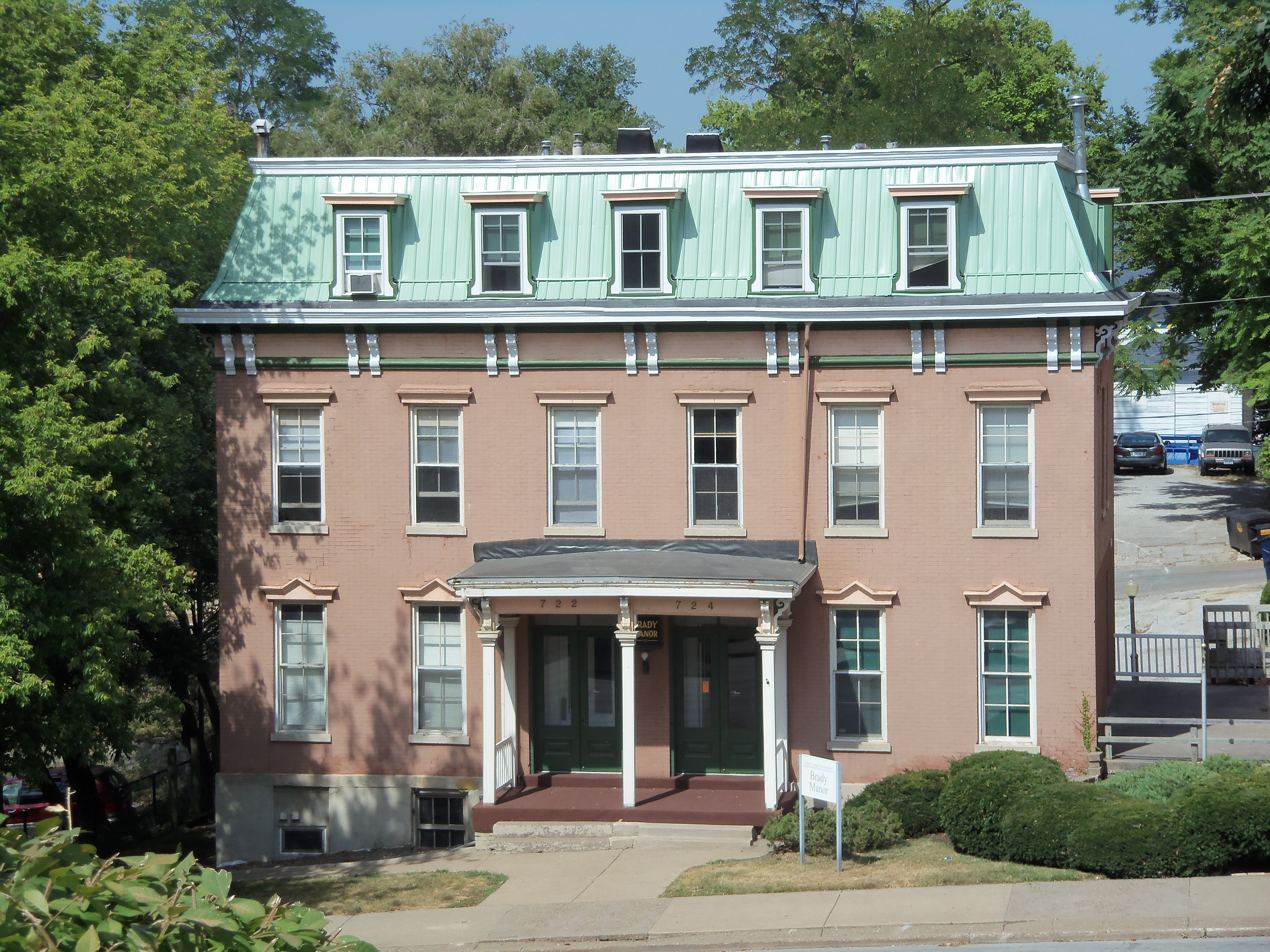

- Location within Iowa Location within the United States
- Location: 722-724 Brady St. Davenport, Iowa
- Coordinates: 41°31′38″N 90°34′27″W
- Area: less than one acre
- Built: 1867
- Architect: T.W. McClelland
- Architectural style: Second Empire
- MPS: Davenport MRA
- NRHP reference No.: 83002475
- Added to NRHP: July 7, 1983

The Daniel T. Newcome Double House, also known as Brady Manor, is a historic building located on the Brady Street Hill in Davenport, Iowa, United States. It has been listed on the National Register of Historic Places since 1983.

== Daniel and Patience Newcomb ==
Daniel and Patience Newcomb farmed 1,200 acres (490 ha) in Scott County, Iowa. In 1842 he produced an unheard of 30,000 bushels of corn. In the 1850s they moved to Davenport and they had a large home built on top of the hill overlooking the downtown area. They had this house built from 1866 to 1867. City directories from that time show that the Newcombs did not occupy this house. This is usually an indication that the person whose name is on the structure was independently wealthy or derived his income from several ventures including real estate.

After Daniel's death in 1870, Patience donated the funds to build Newcomb Presbyterian Memorial Chapel and donated the land for the Academy of Sciences, the forerunner of the Putnam Museum. The Newcomb's residence became St. Luke's Hospital in 1892.

== Architecture ==
The Daniel T. Newcome Double House is a three-story Second Empire structure designed by T.W. McClelland. It is the only recorded double house in Davenport built in that style. The building is brick construction and features bracketed eaves and a mansard roof in metal, which is somewhat unusual in the city. A frieze is created below the eaves with a single strip of molding. The entryways on both sides of the house are in the center of the structure. The six-second floor windows are equally spaced across the front. The paired entrances and the even number of bays is typical of Davenport's double houses. The third floor features five windows. All of the windows are topped with decorative hoods. A small porch covers the double entry. The house presents a symmetrical appearance.
