= MVRDV =

Dutch architecture practice

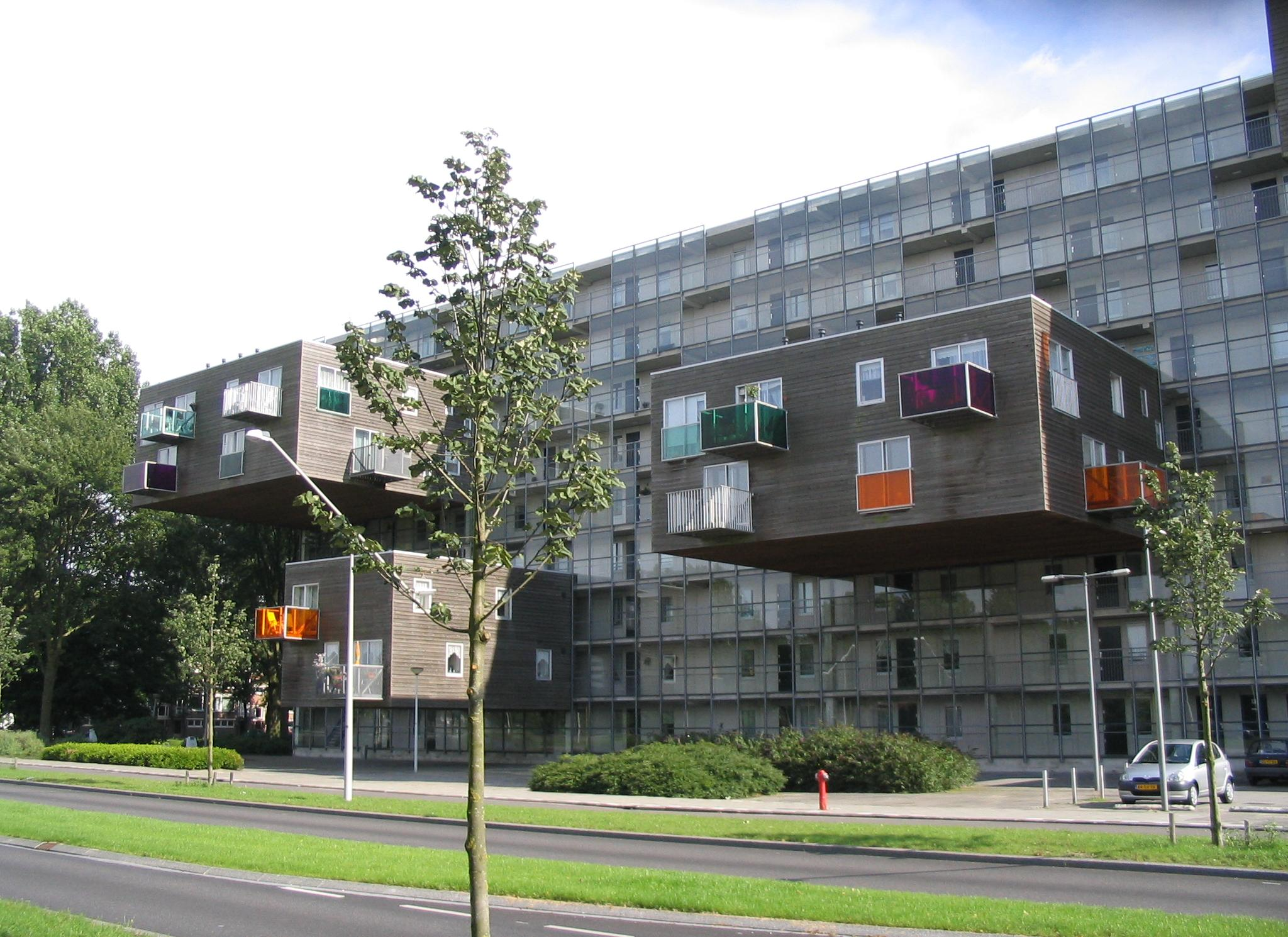
- WOZOCO housing in Amsterdam

Practice information
- Partners: Jan Knikker, Fokke Moerel, Wenchian Shi, Frans de Witte, Bertrand Schippan
- Founders: Winy Maas, Jacob van Rijs, Nathalie de Vries
- Founded: 1993
- No. of employees: +300
- Location: Rotterdam, Berlin, Paris, New York, Shanghai
- Coordinates: 51.92363°N 4.49251°E

Significant works and honors
- Buildings: Hannover World Exhibition Expo 2000 Dutch Pavilion, Silodam Housing, Market Hall Rotterdam Yongsan Dreamhub
- Awards: European Museum of the Year, International Architecture Award, Skyscraper of the Year, Red Dot Design Award, Prix Versailles, RIBA House of the Year (Public Vote)

Website
- mvrdv.com

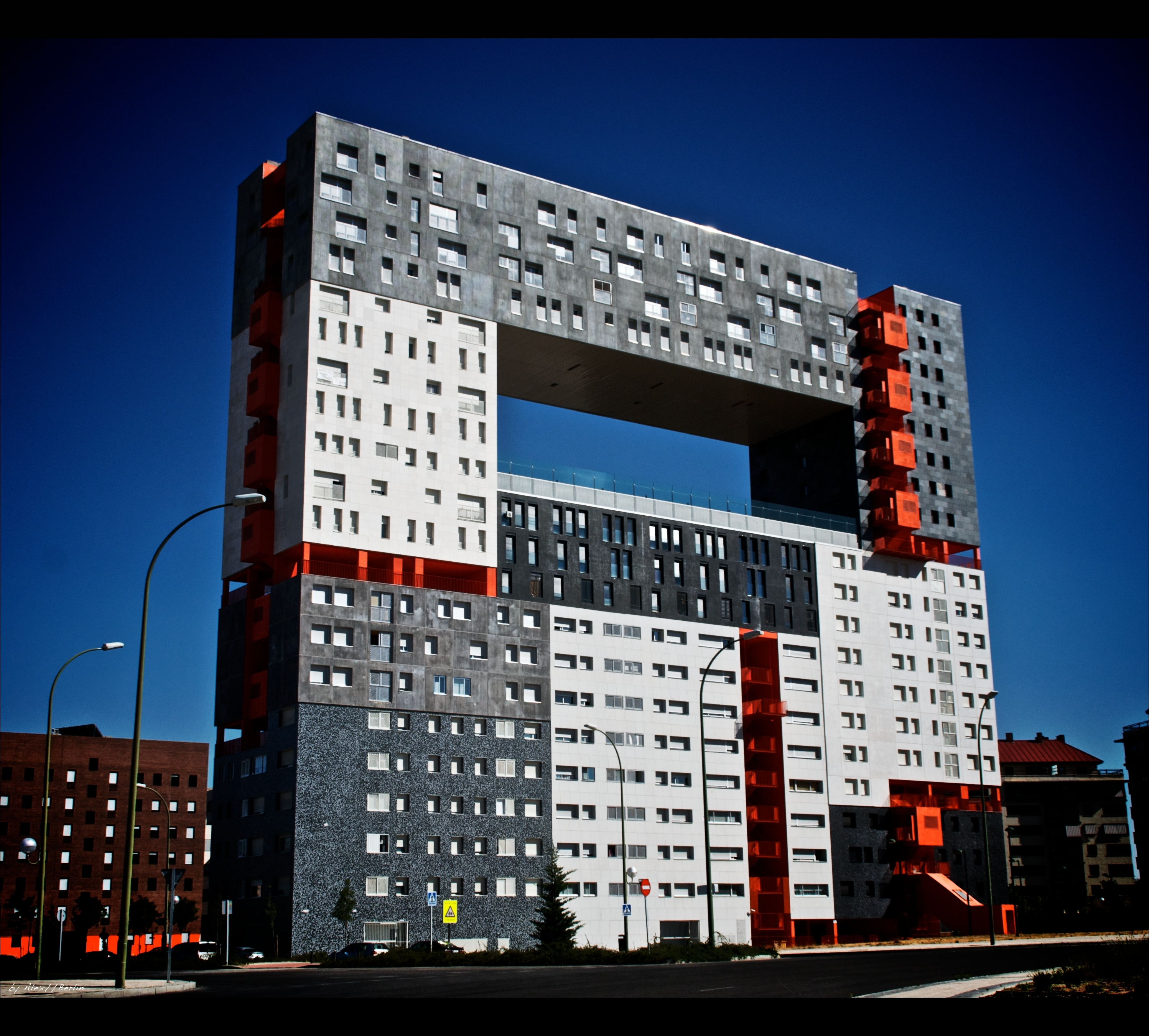
Mirador building (Madrid, Spain, 2005)

MVRDV is a Rotterdam, Netherlands-based architecture and urban design practice founded in 1993 by Winy Maas, Jacob van Rijs and Nathalie de Vries, with additional offices in Berlin, New York, Paris, and Shanghai.

The name and logo is inspired by the industrial music band KMFDM which at the time was one of Jacob van Rijs' favorite bands. It is currently regarded as one of the world's finest architecture firms. MVRDV is an acronym of the founding members' surnames: Winy Maas, Jacob van Rijs, and Nathalie de Vries.

== History ==
Maas and Van Rijs worked at OMA, De Vries at Mecanoo before starting MVRDV.

The trio studied architecture together at the Delft University of Technology, Netherlands and won the "Europan 2" competition with their project "Berlinvoids" in 1991 before founding MVRDV two years later. The situation for starting a new office in the Netherlands was favourable – government support for young architects means all three received a grant to help start their architectural practice.

It took some time for the company to get going, working without a fixed office until the firm's first major commission arrived. This was the new offices for the public broadcasting corporation VPRO in Hilversum, the Netherlands (1993–1997). Other early built works include the Wozoco housing in Amsterdam (1994–1997) and the Dutch Pavilion at the Hannover World Exhibition Expo 2000 (1997–2000). These were followed by a business park 'Flight Forum' in Eindhoven, Gemini Residence silo conversion in Copenhagen, the Silodam Housing complex in Amsterdam, the Matsudai Cultural Centre in Japan, Unterföhring office campus near Munich, the Lloyd Hotel in Amsterdam, an urban plan and housing in The Hague Ypenburg, the rooftop – housing extension Didden Village in Rotterdam, the cultural Centre De Effenaar in Eindhoven, the boutique shopping building Gyre in Tokyo, part of Veldhoven's Maxima Medical Centre, and the iconic Mirador housing estate in Madrid.

Completed projects between 2012 and 2014 include a public library in Spijkenisse, the Netherlands, a shopping center in Schijndel, the Netherlands, a bank headquarters in Oslo, Norway, and the Market Hall in Rotterdam combining housing and shopping within the shape of an arch.

Projects from the early 2020s included various housing projects in the Netherlands, China, France, India, the United Kingdom, the United States and other countries, a sustainable office building in Paris, a central business district in Shanghai, an office tower in Poznań, a museum of rock music and a community cultural centre in Roskilde and Frederiksberg respectively, large scale urban masterplans in Oslo, Bordeaux and Caen, an entire new eco-city in Logrono, Spain, a structural development vision for Dutch New Town Almere, the masterplan for the Dutch Floriade Horticultural Expo 2022, also in Almere, and a research masterplan into the future of greater Paris which was commissioned by French president Nicolas Sarkozy and the mayor of Paris, Bertrand Delanoë.

MVRDV also maintains a research-oriented project called "The Why Factory", which the company describes as an "independent think-tank and research institute". It is run together with the Delft University of Technology.

== Influences ==
In a 2010 interview with Designboom, Winy Maas cited Rem Koolhaas as one of the most important people that he had worked with and for, describing parts of MVRDV's work as intellectual responses to Koolhaas's questions. The architect and critic Rafael Moneo has noted the common featured between OMA and MVRDV, starting with the positioning of the architect in their draft process, with projects treated as collaborative efforts and the architect acting as a catalyst. An article in El Croquis further argued that "if the notion of creation is still present in their discourse, it is more than a co-creation or synergy between all the parties than as the exclusive vision or synthesis of an architect."

The concept of densification - where the population density or building density is increased via taller buildings or adding more housing units - is a topic Koolhaas focused heavily on in his book "Delirious New York". Reflection on the notion of densification also comprises a significant part of MVRDV's research, for instance in their publications FARMAX and KM3, with Maas further noting that "... proximity makes sense. That's a fundamental part of our culture for many of us." In El Croquis, architect Fernando Márquez Cecilia notes that "through these conceptual overlaps, the projects of the two offices show in some cases even strong formal accordance, as in the case of the VPRO Building and the Educatorium".

Maas has also noted that the Club of Rome warnings made in the 1960s over the dangers of global growth, which Maas heard as a ten-year old, contributed to his decision to study landscape architecture and urban planning. This continues to inform his ideas – solutions to the climate crisis must be sought on a large scale.

Nathalie de Vries cites De Stijl, the Dutch museum director Franks Haks, and Mecanoo´s housing and neighbourhood projects as influences. Mecanoo is where de Vries began her professional career.

== Architectural language ==
The variety of design choices in their buildings demonstrate that MVRDV wishes not to develop a specific style of architecture, but to provide and develop different methods in designing architecture and urban space. Projects are developed by interdisciplinary teams that test different possibilities rather than designing "top-down". Over the years, this strategy led to the development of an architectural language that helps in explaining design choices to others.

In the exhibition "Architecture speaks" – The Language of MVRDV, MVRDV presented four conceptual themes to describe their work. The exhibition was shown in the "aut", an architectural centre in the Tyrol region of Innsbruck, Austria and was curated by Natalie de Vries.

- "stack": This refers to the ever growing demand in space as well as the approach to stack and connect functions vertically, to create a three-dimensional space. This method came into use for the "Berlinvoids" design, where the office saw an opportunity to renew the standard way to deal with densification.
- "pixel": The term "pixel" deals with the boundaries of space and provides the smallest unit in an agglomeration of units. It was initially developed as a measuring tool for the offices software "The Function mixer" and transformed into a flexible form that is adapted to the needs of its function.
- "village": With the manifestation of the term village, MVRDV takes the next step into not only wanting to develop the immediate building but also the context. They use the "village" to be an example for ideal homes and neighbourhoods that can work as a basis for "healthy community-making"(DeVries, 2019).
- "activator": Spaces that engage social interaction are referred to as "activators". These projects provide structures that exceed habitable use, being descriptive of the social interaction process rather than the formalistic character of the structure itself.

== Notable works ==
=== Valley, Amsterdam, Netherlands ===
Winner of the Emporis Skyscraper Award, Valley is a mixed-use, semi-publicly accessible development in the Zuidas business district of Amsterdam. Comprising three towers of heights ranging from 67 to 100 metres tall, it combines offices, shops, catering, cultural facilities, and apartments in one building. Described as “an oasis in a business district dominated by regular office buildings” a green valley winds between the fourth and fifth floors, wholly accessible via two stone external staircases.

=== Depot Boijmans Van Beuningen, Rotterdam, Netherlands ===
MVRDV won the design competition for the depot in 2013, for which the assignment was to offer a glimpse behind the scenes of the museum world and make the whole art collection accessible to the public. The world's first publicly accessible art storage facility and a 2023 Architectural Digest “Work of Wonder”, the depot displays more than 150,000 works of art and design that the Museum Boijmans Van Beuningen previously had no room to exhibit. In addition to the significant amount of storage space required for art and design works, the depot comprises exhibition halls, a rooftop garden, and a restaurant.

=== Tianjin Binhai Library, Tianjin, China ===
Nicknamed “The Eye”, the Tianjin Binhai Library is part of the Binhai Cultural Center, and MVRDV's second complered project in the Chinese municipality. A five-level library possessing a total floor space of 33,700 square metres, it features floor-to-ceiling terraced bookshelves able to hold 1.2 million books, with a 110-capacity auditorium set in a central sphere. According to Newsweek’s culture writer, Anna Menta, the library is “breathtaking” and “every book lover’s dream.” This was MVRDV's fastest realised project to date, taking only three years from the first sketch to the opening.

== Current Projects ==
As of 2023, MVRDV's current projects include:

=== Europe ===
- Innovation Park Artificial Intelligence, Heilbronn, Germany
- Project Gomila, Palma, Mallorca, Spain
- Skanderbeg Building, Tirana, Albania
- Tripolis Park, Amsterdam, Netherlands
- Gagarin Valley, Gagarin, Armenia
- Portlantis, Rotterdam, Netherlands
- Magasin 113, Gothenburg, Sweden
- The Sax, Rotterdam, Netherlands
- (Y)our City Centre, Glasgow, United Kingdom
- Fabryczna Offices, Łódź, Poland
- Turm Mit Taille, Vienna, Austria
- Basel Rheincity, Basel, Switzerland
- Grand Paris, Paris, France

=== Americas ===
- Ziel, Montevideo, Uruguay
- Glass Mural, Detroit, United States
- The Hills, Guayaquil, Ecuador
- Armourdale Area Master Plan, Kansas City, United States
- The Canyon, San Francisco, United States

=== Asia ===
- Chengdu Jiaozi Courtyard Towers, Chengdu, China
- Hangzhou Oil Refinery Factory Park, Hangzhou, China
- Wuhan Library, Wuhan, China
- Sun Rock, Taichung, Taiwan
- Irwell Hill Residences, Singapore
- Shenzhen Terraces, Shenzhen, China
- Hoowave Water Factory, Huwei, Taiwan
- Oasis Towers, Nanjing, China
- LAD HQ, Shanghai, China
- The Weaves, Seoul, South Korea
- Zhangjiang Future Park, Shanghai, China
- Pixel, Abu Dhabi, United Arab Emirates

== Gallery ==
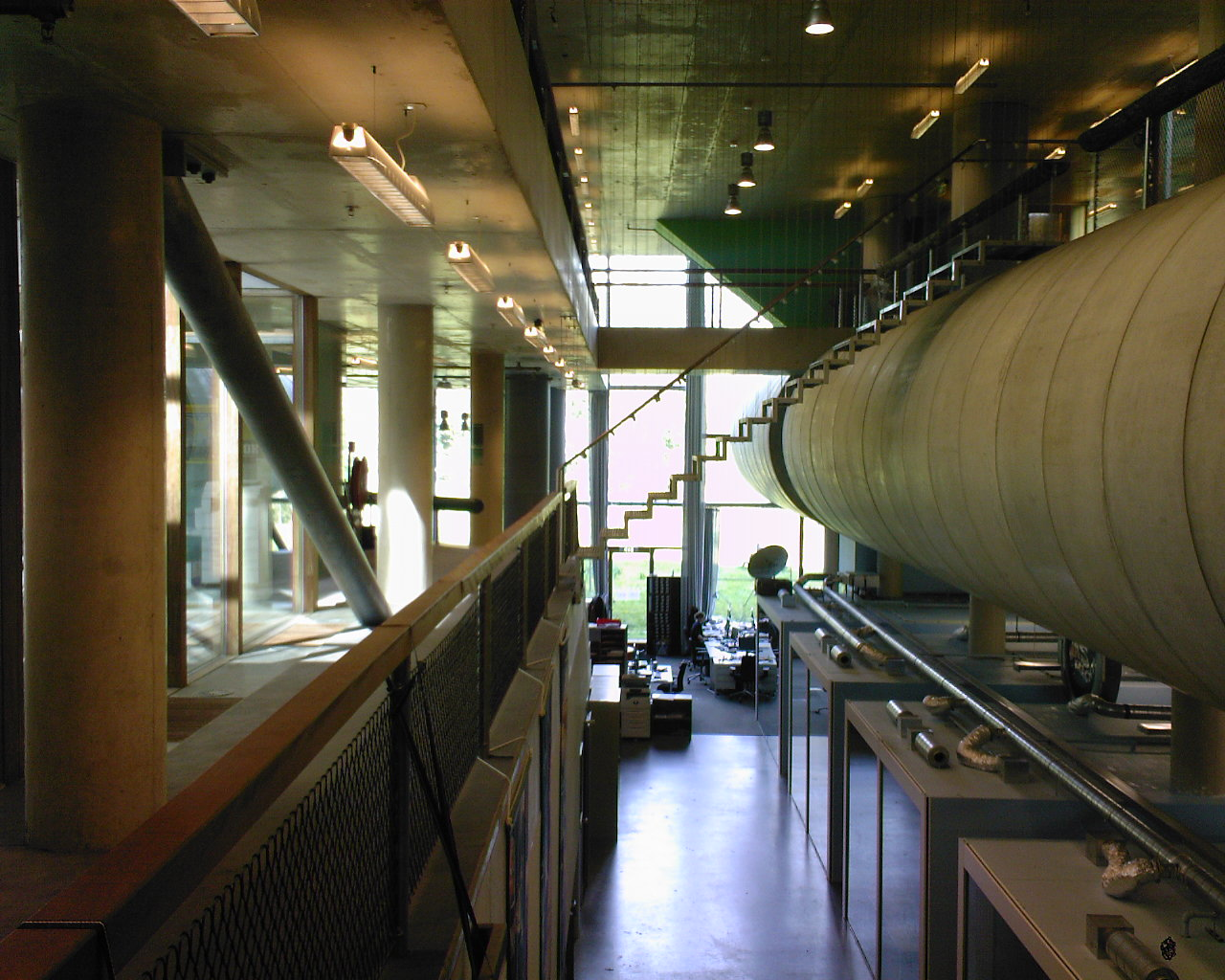
Villa VPRO, Hilversum, Netherlands, MVRDV

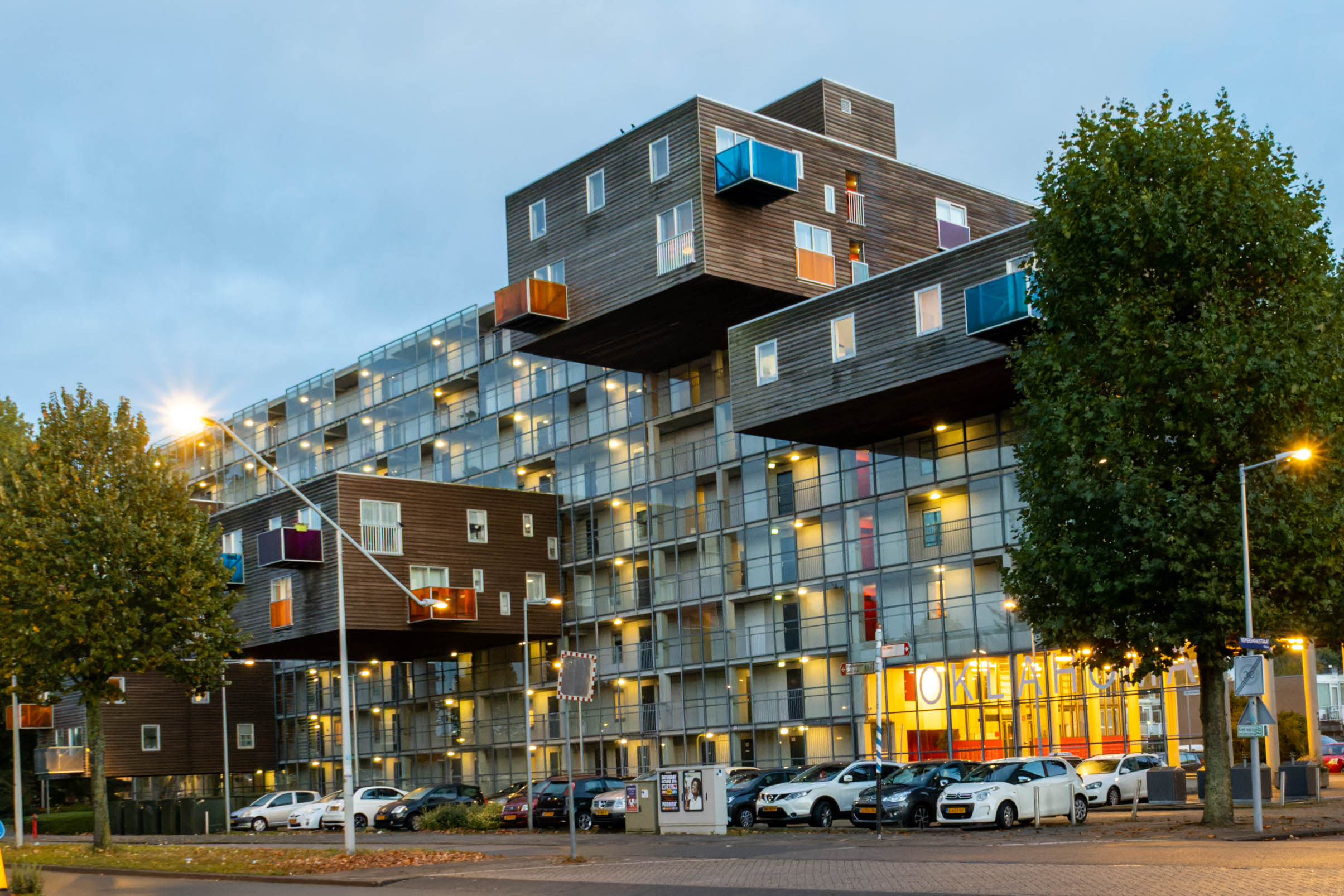
WoZoCo housing complex, Amsterdam, Netherlands, MVRDV

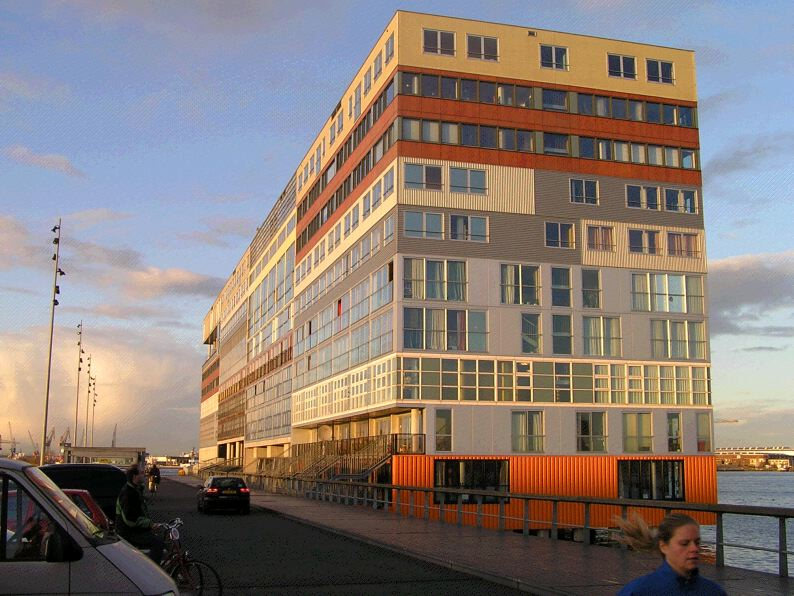
Silodam Housing complex, Amsterdam, Netherlands, MVRDV

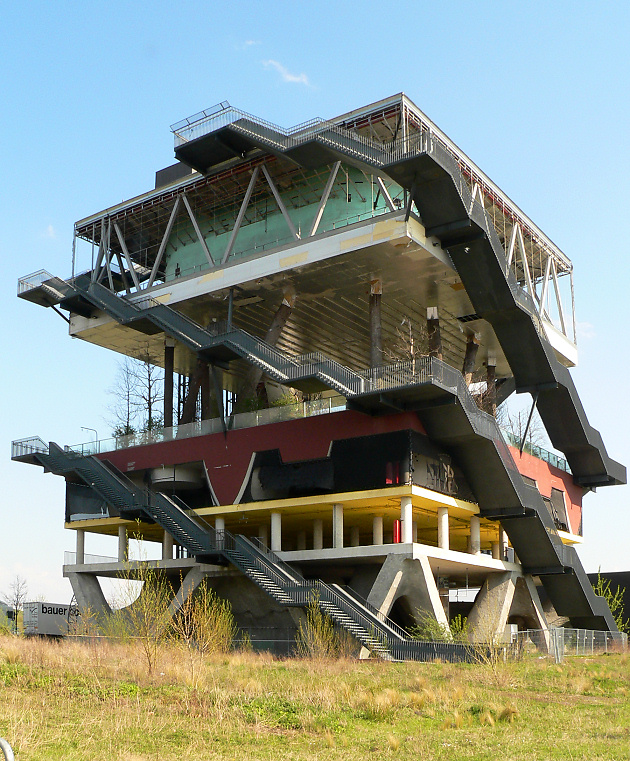
Dutch Pavilion at Expo 2000, Hannover, Germany, MVRDV

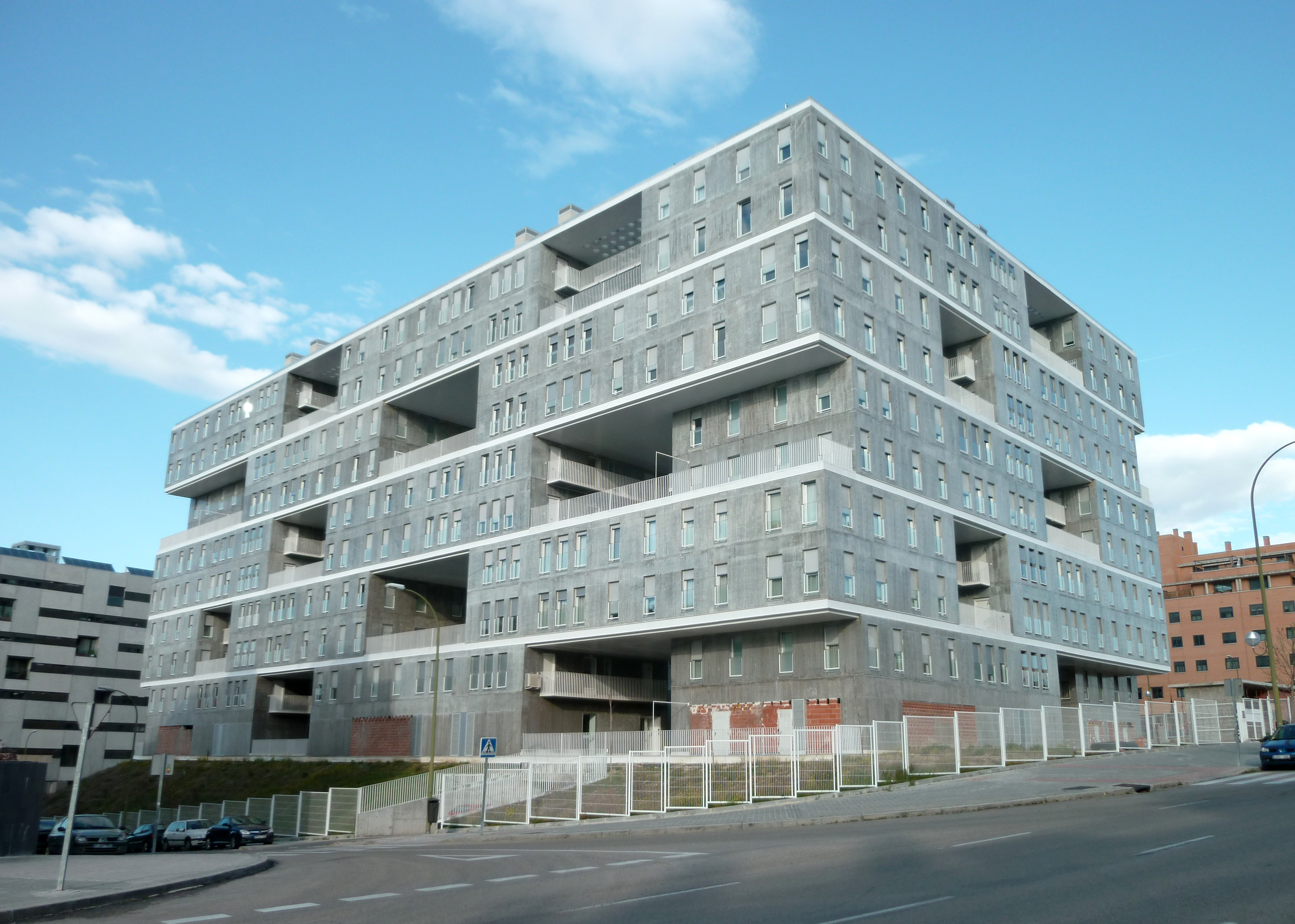
Edificio Celosía, Madrid, Spain, MVRDV

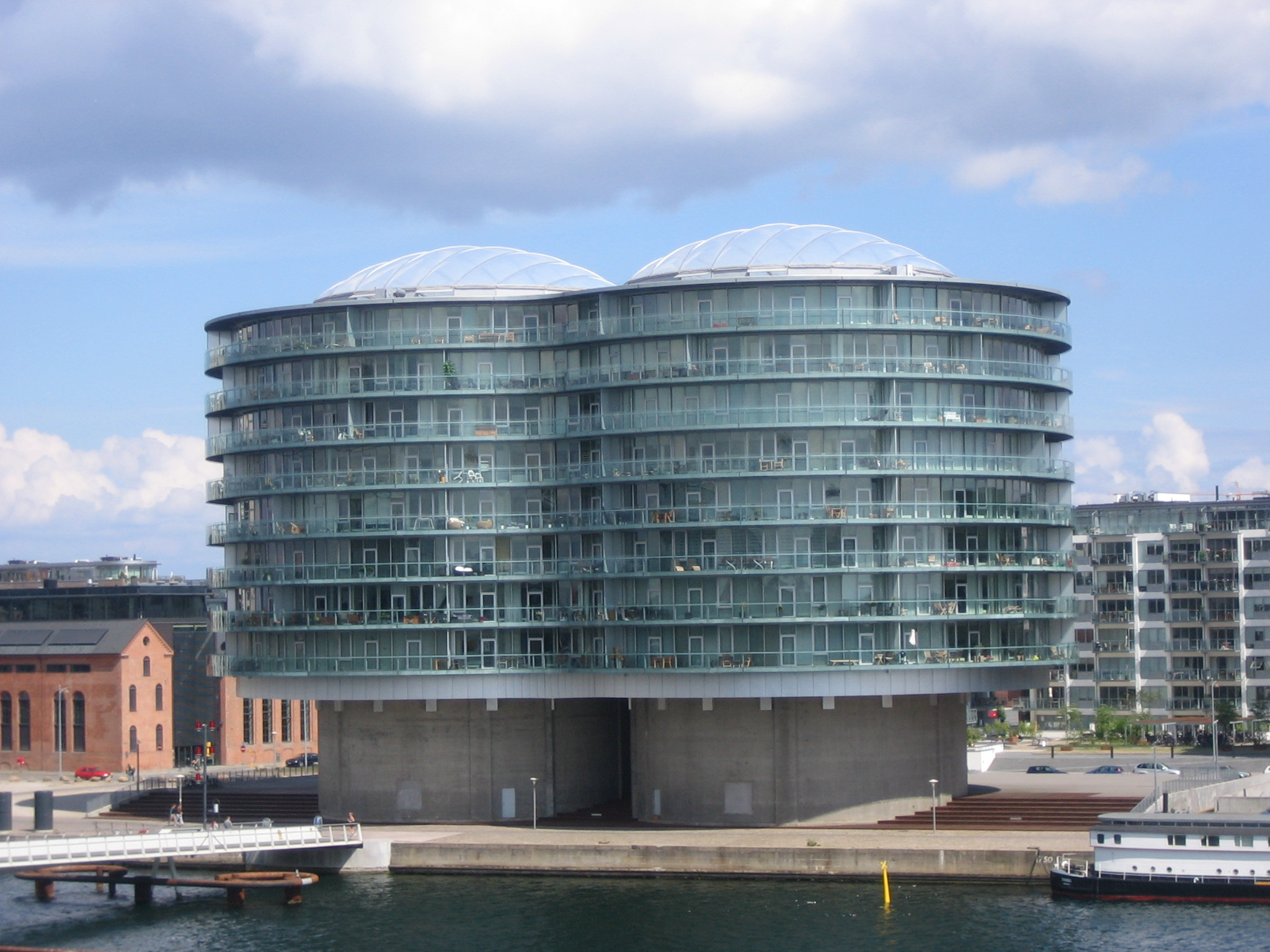
Gemini Residence, Islands Brygge, Copenhagen, Denmark, MVRDV

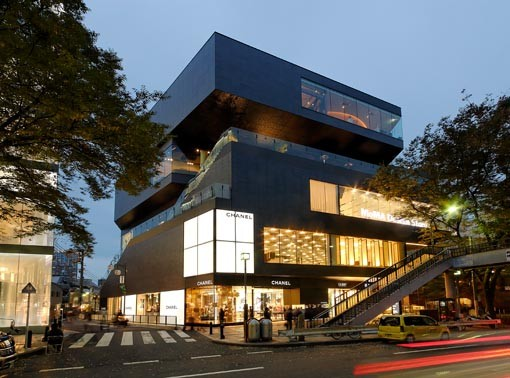
"The Gyre", Omotesandō Avenue, Tokyo, Japan, MVRDV

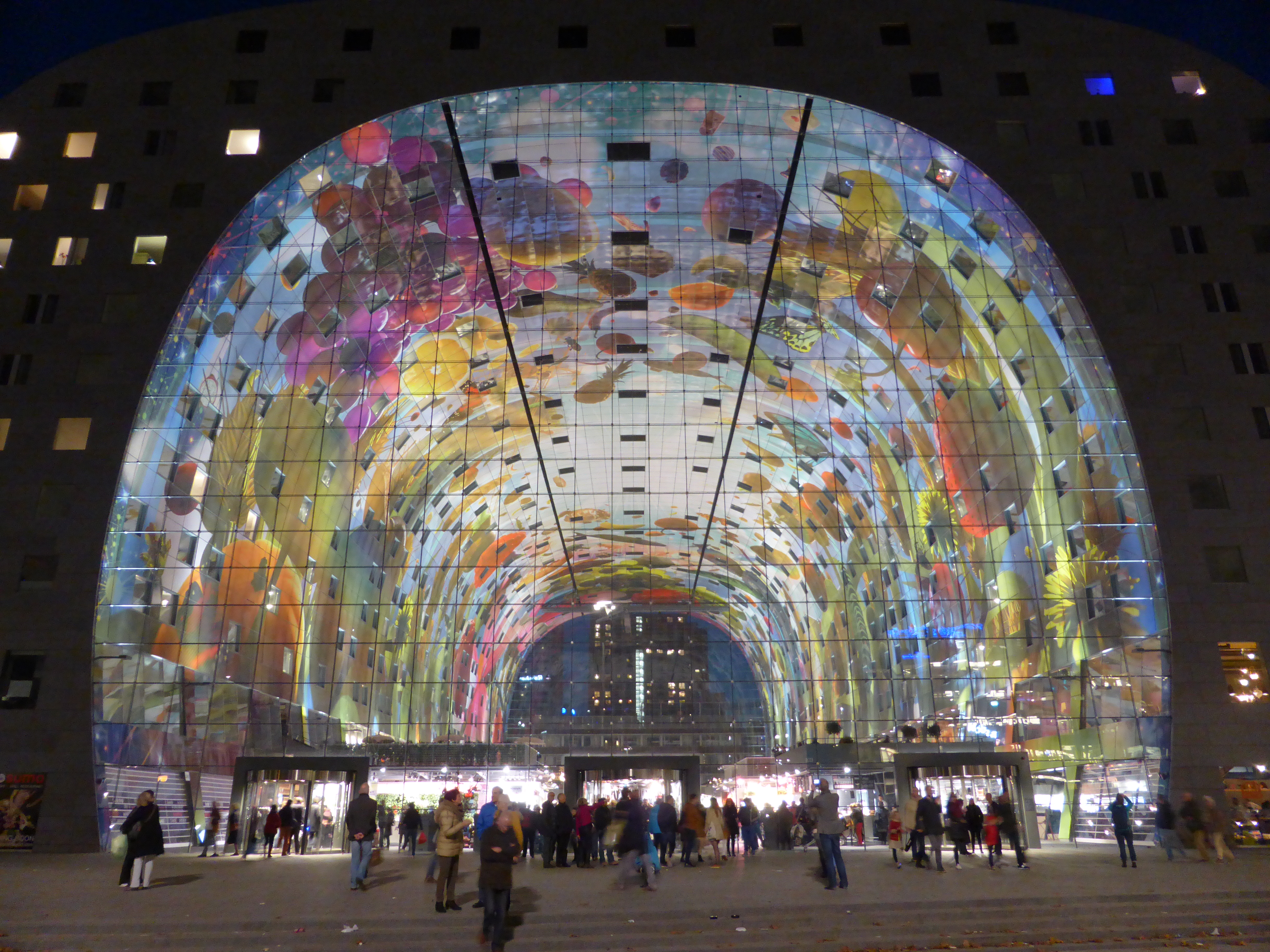
Market Hall Rotterdam, Rotterdam, Netherlands, MVRDV

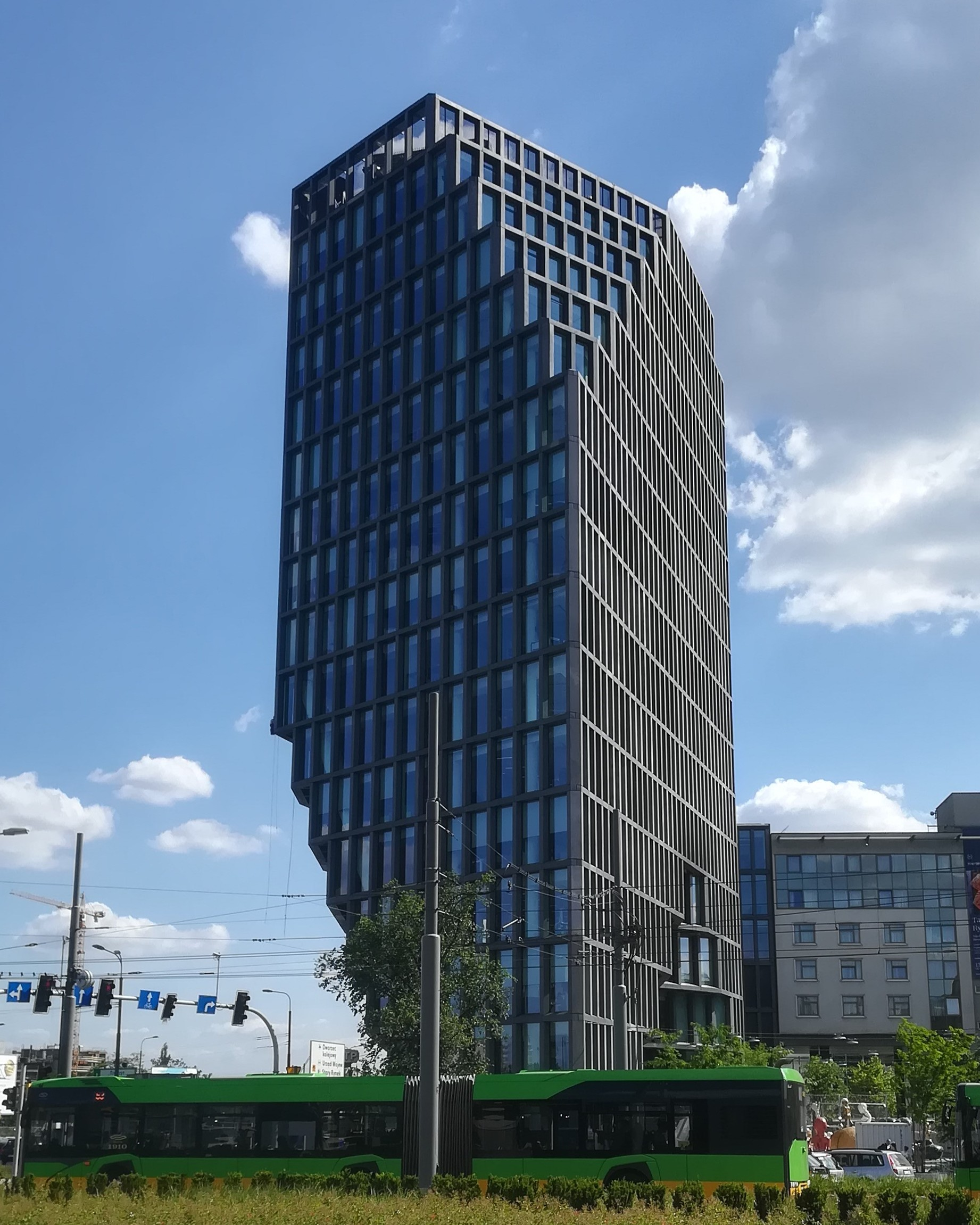
Bałtyk office building, Poznań, Poland, MVRDV

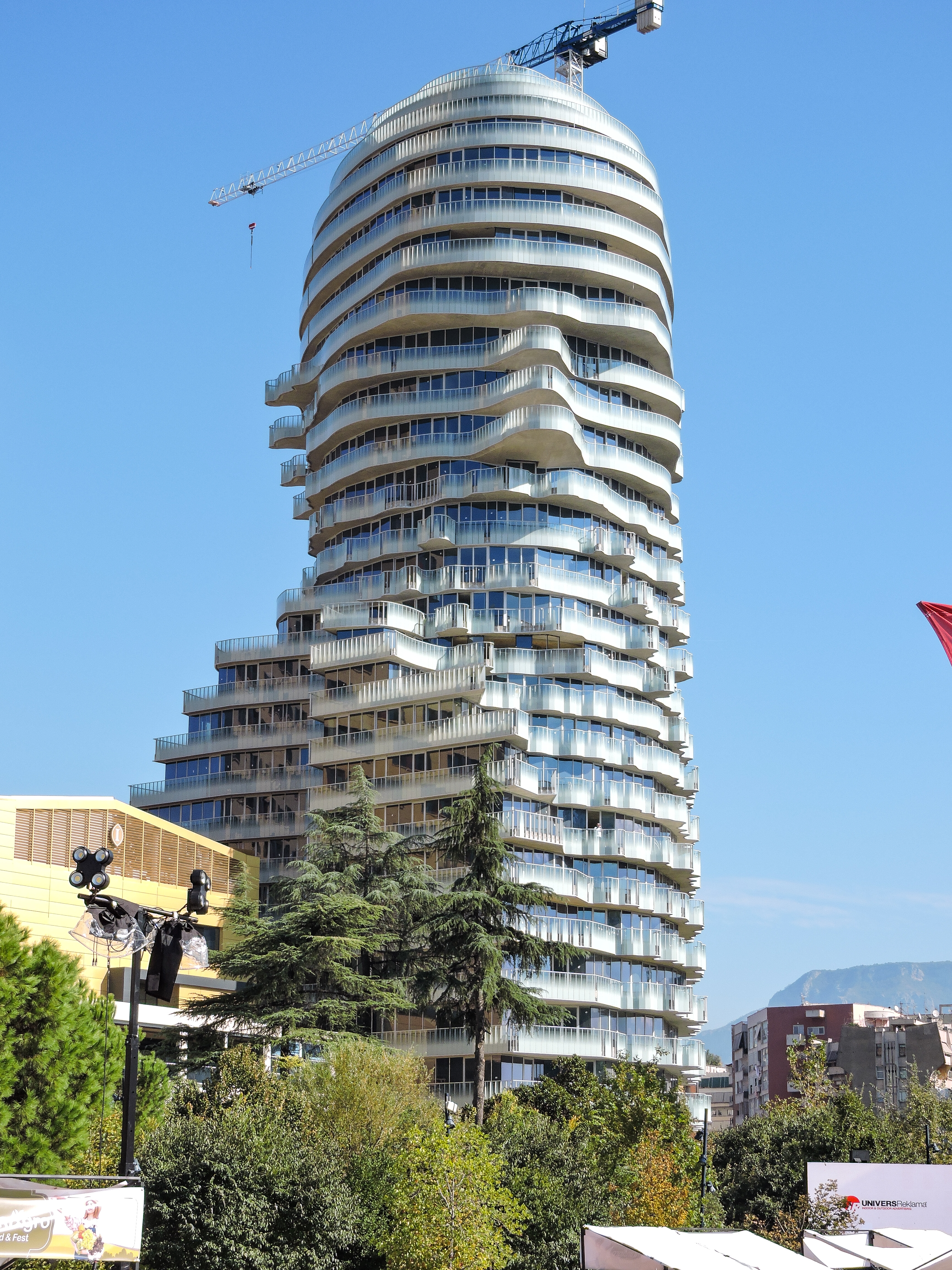
Tirana's Rock, Tirana, Albania, MVRDV

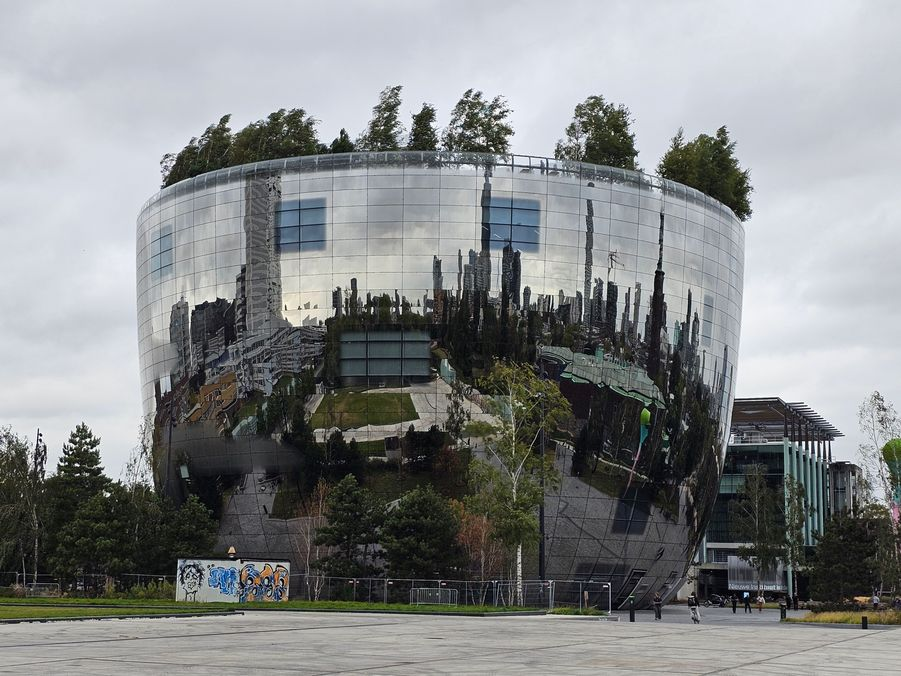
Depot Museum Boijmans Van Beuningen 2025, Rotterdam

== Awards ==
MVRDV has won awards across multiple architectural categories including housing, public buildings, commercial buildings, mixed-used developments, interior design, exterior design, and landscape architecture. Notable accolades include the RIBA House of the Year (Public Vote), European Museum of the Year Jury Prize, Emporis Skyscraper Award, ArchDaily Building of the Year, Prix Versailles, International Architecture Award, Architizer A+ Award, and Red Dot Design Award. MVRDV's work has been exhibited in multiple locations including Gallery MA, Tokyo; Het Nieuwe Instituut, Rotterdam; ArchiLib Gallery, Paris; Kyoto Global Design Awards – Environmental Design category and Architektur Galerie, Berlin.

== Criticism ==
MVRDV's rise to that of a significant force within the architecture industry has been accompanied by critical voices. The Markthal in Rotterdam, despite winning several awards, did not meet with universal acclaim. Rob Bevan of Architectural Review described it as being part of an overall mistaken preference in Rotterdam for a "stodgy diet of instant icons" and indicative of "noodle-headed re-shaping and architectural gymnastics", the implication being that more modest designs as part of a more integrated city-wide planning would create more successful buildings, although Bevan tempered his criticism in acknowledging that "There is curiosity value then in MVRDV’s immovable feast with its seemingly calculated jolie laide proportions and it has brought vigour to a corner of the city demanding it".

The urban and architectural geographer Mark Minkjan expressed a belief that contemporary architects often serve as makeup artists of sales pitches, or producers of visually pleasing "eye candies" using MVRDV's "Valley" to illustrate his view. As a case study, he made a specific critique of the renderings of Valley, an MVRDV project located in an emerging business district of Amsterdam and subsequently named the world's best skyscraper in the 2021 Emporis Awards. Minkjan saw the renderings as cosmetic, deceptive images that hid the environmental, financial challenges that would occur during and after the building's construction, saying "In reality ... the building will never turn out like the rendering". Furthermore, despite "Valley's" commercial spaces receiving BREEAM "Excellent" certification, the building's energy performance being 30% better than local regulations require, and the residential area scoring 8 out of 10 on the GPR Building Scale, Minkjan nonetheless accuses the office of greenwashing, stating his view that the unrealistic illustration of rooftop gardens and terraces, which ignore the effects of smog, wind, poor soil and changing seasons, deflect attention from the sizeable CO_{2} emissions of the building construction. Minkjan's criticism notwithstanding, "Valley" has been positively received, and garden designer Piet Oudolf worked with MVRDV on the building, using around 13,500 plants in 370 planting areas over 27 floors.

MVRDV's design of the Marble Arch Mound in London was not well received. Critics named the creation of an artificial hill around and over London's Marble Arch to be pointless, a massive waste of time and material, a pile of rubble, and London's worst attraction. MVRDV acknowledged the poor architectural result but also pointed to Westminster City Council for watering down their design, excluding the studio from overseeing the construction, and ignoring their advice.

== Research ==
=== The Why Factory ===
The Why Factory is a global think tank and research institute at Delft University of Technology, led by professor Winy Maas. Its research revolves around analyzing urban developments and providing scenarios for future cities and societies. There is particular focus on opening engaging the public in architectural debate through exhibitions, workshops, publications and panel discussions. Founded in 2007, the think tank also provides an experimental outlook on the urban landscape of the future by exploring imaginary narratives and their interlinked new social contexts. To develop scenarios further, the Why Factory also uses computational design tools for analyzing and generating these concepts.

Some of research projects of MVRDV:

- Gwangju Folly
- Crystal Houses
- Almere Oosterworld
- Grand Paris
- Almere 2030
- Airbus UAM
- Pampus Harbour
- North Sea Wind Park
- Pig City
- The NEXT ITMO
- Oslo Le Grand
- Stadt Land Schweiz
- Skycar City
- Metacity/Datatown
- Myst Light Fixture
- The Why Factory
- Architecture Speaks: The Language of MVRDV
- Infinity Kitchen
- Vertical Village IBA
- Vertical Village Seoul
- House of Clothing
- NL28 Olympic Fire
- Freeland @ the Biennale
- Vertical City Taipei
- Bi-City Biennale 2017
- MVRDV Haus Berlin
- Porous City Lego Towers
- The Hungry Box
- MVRDVH20
- China Hills

== Publications ==
- FARMAX (010 Publishers, Rotterdam, 1999)
- Metacity/Datatown (010 Publishers, Rotterdam, 1999)
- Reading MVRDV (NAi Publishers, Rotterdam, 2003)
- Spacefighter The evolutionary city game (Actar, Barcelona, 2005)
- KM3 Excursions on Capacities (Actar, Barcelona, 2006)
- Skycar City (Actar, Barcelona, 2008)
- MVRDV Agendas on Urbanism (Equal Books, Seoul, 2012)
- The Glass Farm – Biography of a Building (010 Publishers, Rotterdam, 2013)
- Book Mountain – Biography of a Building (010 Publishers, Rotterdam, 2013)
- MVRDV Buildings (010 Publishers, Rotterdam, 2015)
- MVRDV Dream Works (Arquitectura Viva, Spain, 2016)
- MVRDV: Investigations and new creative visions of the Urban Landscape (ARCS Media Group – Corriere della Sera, Italy, 2017)
- Rooftop Catalogue (Rotterdamse Dakendagen, Rotterdam, 2021)
- Attitudes: MVRDV (Maas Lawrence, Rotterdam, 2024)
