= Capture of Yerba Buena =

- Part of Conquest of California; Mexican–American War
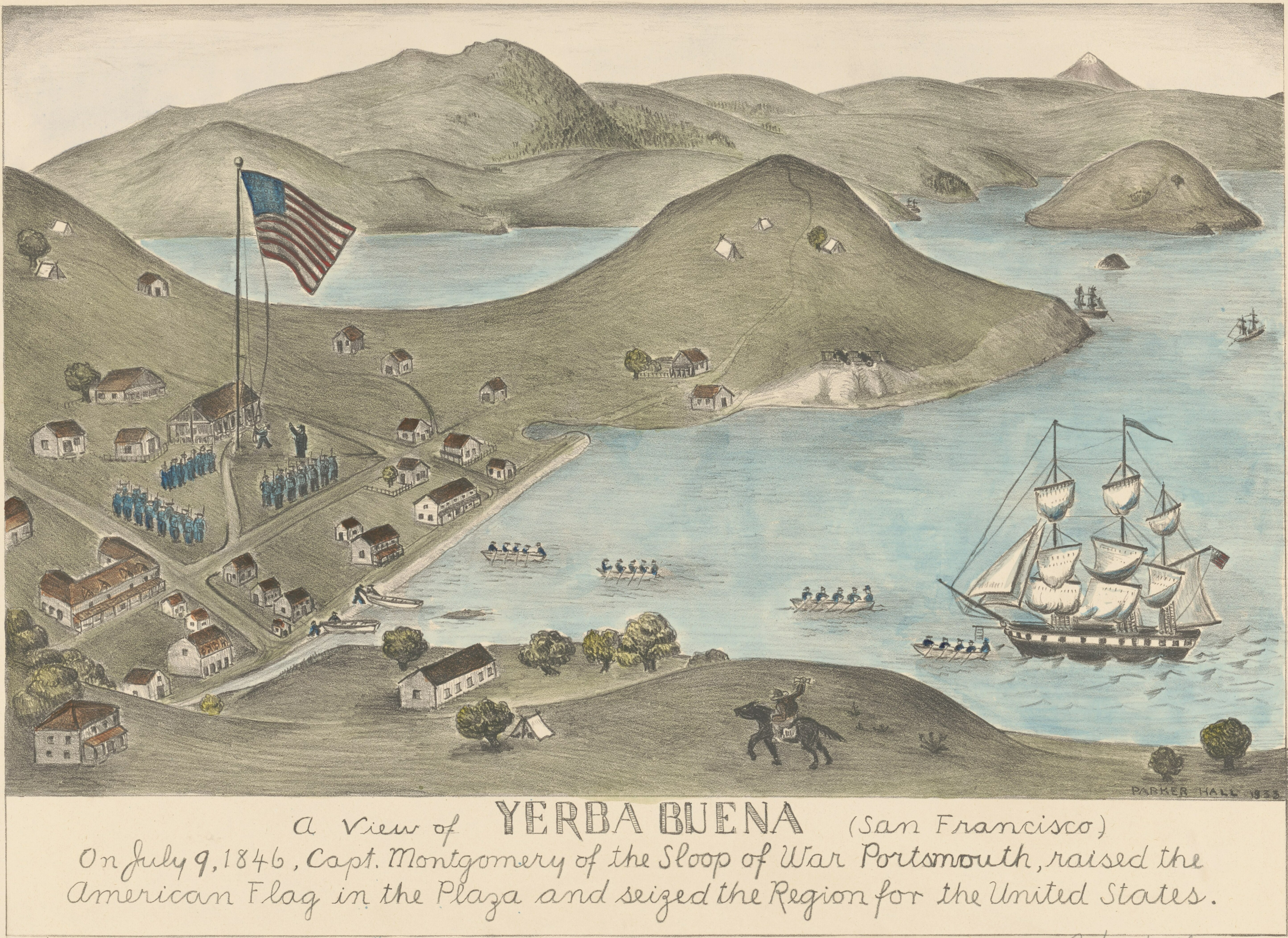
Date	July 9, 1846
Location	Yerba Buena, California (Present-day San Francisco, California)
Result	United States victory

Belligerents
United States	Mexico

Commanders and leaders
John B. Montgomery	José de Jesús Noé

Strength
USS Portsmouth, 220 sailors and enlisted men, 27 marines	Unknown number of troops and artillery

Casualties and losses
0	0

The Capture of Yerba Buena was an engagement during the Mexican–American War, during which the U.S. Navy captured and occupied the town of Yerba Buena, California (now San Francisco), without firing a shot.

== Background ==
Six months before the United States declared war on Mexico on May 13, 1846, President James Polk had given orders to the U.S. Navy's Pacific Squadron to occupy every important port and city in California, with force, if necessary, upon learning beyond doubt that war had broken out.

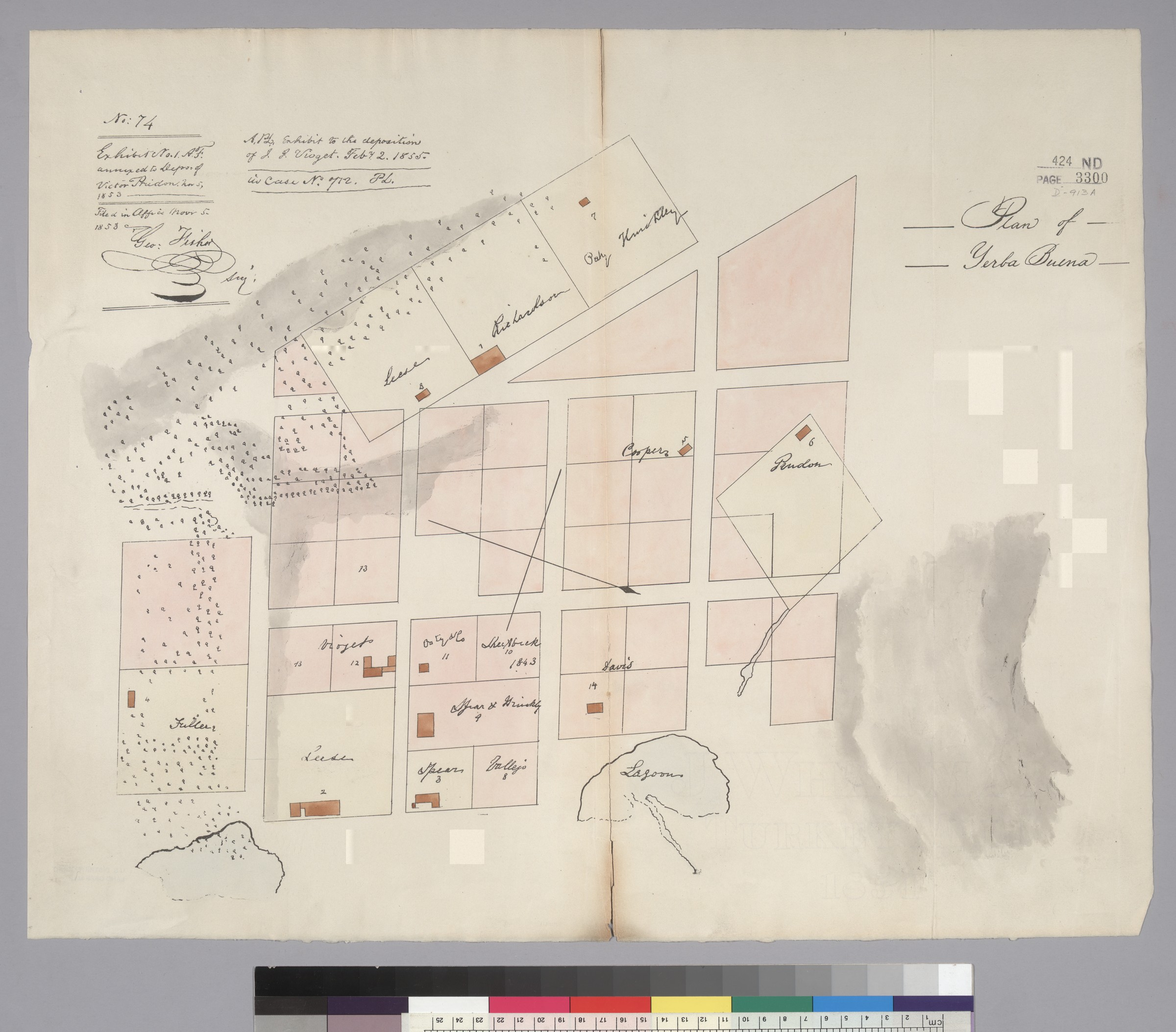
Map of Yerba Buena, drawn by Jean Jacques Vioget in 1839; the town square (later renamed Portsmouth Square) is just south of the compass rose.

In Monterey, California, U.S. Consul Thomas O. Larkin, concerned about the increasing possibility of war, sent a request to Commodore John D. Sloat of the Pacific Squadron, for a warship to protect U.S. citizens and interests in Alta California. In response, the USS Portsmouth, commanded by John Berrien Montgomery, arrived at Monterey on April 22, 1846, and moved to San Francisco Bay by mid-May, anchoring at Sausalito. While there, a messenger from American Captain John C. Frémont's expedition requested supplies from the Portsmouth, which soon returned to Monterey. After Montgomery conveyed the information about Frémont's presence in California, Larkin and Montgomery decided the ship should return to San Francisco Bay. She sailed north from Monterey on June 1.

On June 14, 1846, the Bear Flag Revolt, an uprising of American settlers, tacitly supported by Frémont, engaged and soon took control of the Sonoma Barracks.

On July 1, Frémont and twelve men convinced Captain William Phelps to ferry them from Sausalito to Castillo de San Joaquin, an abandoned fort south of the side of the Golden Gate, where they plugged the touch-holes of ten rusty cannons. The next day Robert B. Semple led ten men to the pueblo of Yerba Buena to arrest the naturalized Englishman Robert Ridley, who was captain of the port. Ridley was sent to Sutter's Fort to be locked up with other prisoners. The rebels also took down the Mexican flag and raised the Bear Flag over the plaza at Yerba Buena.

On July 7, the ships USS Savannah, USS Cyane and USS Levant captured the Alta California capital city of Monterey without firing a shot. This set the stage for the capture of Yerba Buena two days later.

== Capture of the city ==
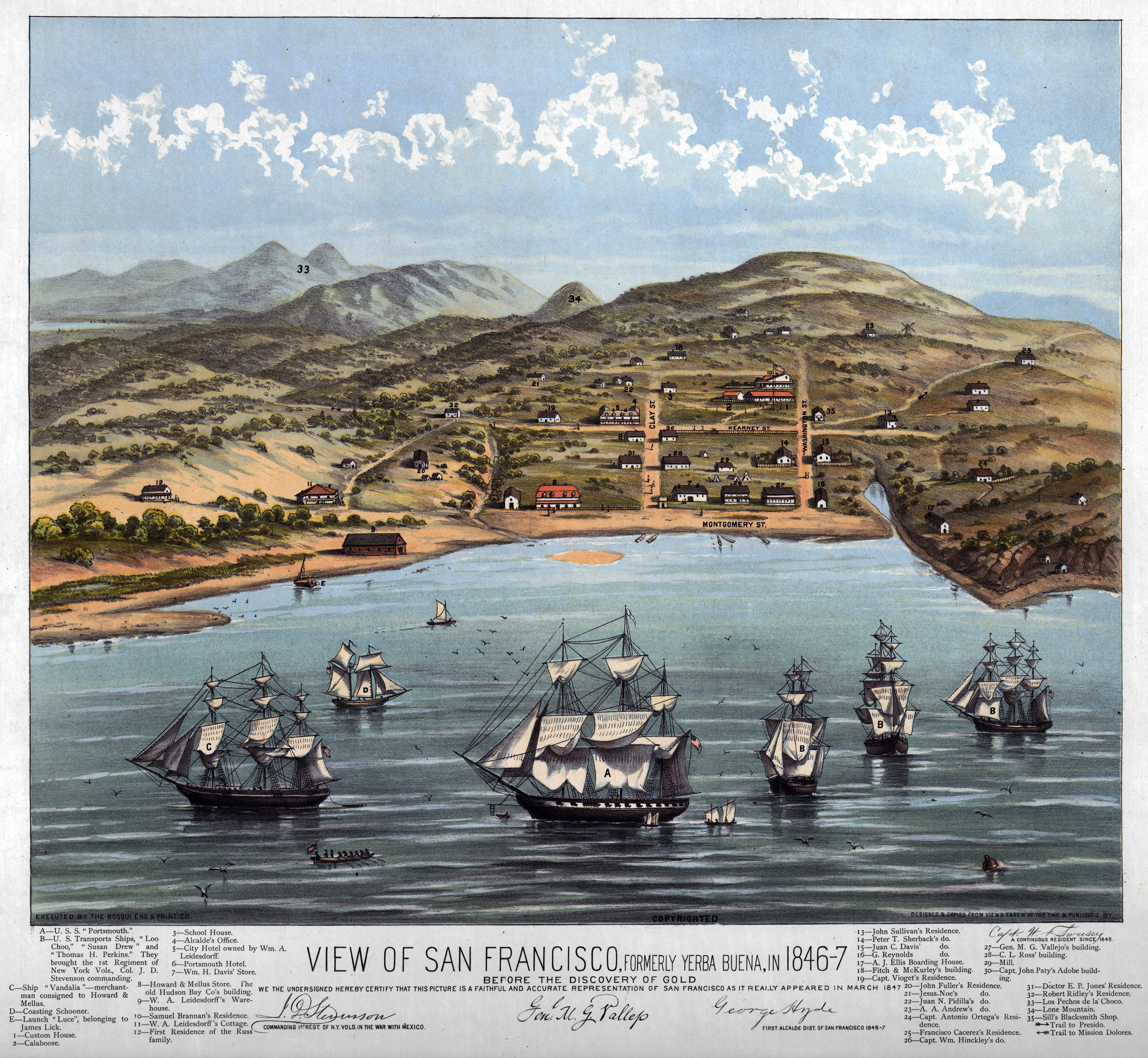
View of Yerba Buena at the time of the town's capture by American forces. Lithograph by Edward Bosqui Co, ca. 1884.

The USS Portsmouth had been in San Francisco Bay, aiding the Bear Flag uprising and monitoring the situation. On July 8, 1846, Montgomery received orders from Commodore Sloat to capture the pueblo of Yerba Buena. The Portsmouth moored a distance off the shore of Yerba Buena Cove. Aboard the Portsmouth were 220 sailors and enlisted men, along with a contingent of 27 marines. A small detachment of marines and a few sailors were dispatched early the next morning and disembarked in rowboats to secure the entry of Montgomery and the other officers.

Accounts vary as to the exact location of the landing. Some accounts state that the landing was at the foot of what would later be Clay Street, a few blocks from the plaza of Yerba Buena. (A historical landmark is found near this location today.) Other accounts state that the landing party initially landed and assembled farther away at Clark's Point. Upon landing on the shore, the Californios, American settlers, and the few Mexican military personnel present grouped together to watch the American force parade into the square, playing Yankee Doodle on fife and drum. Montgomery read a proclamation before some 40 onlookers, informing them that California was now American territory and that the occupation would not be an oppressive one. Printed copies of the proclamation were circulated in English and Spanish. The American flag was then raised (some accounts also mention the lowering of the Bear Flag and its handing-off to one of the officer's sons) and the marine band began to play. The USS Portsmouth then fired a 21-gun salute.

Following the capture of the town itself, Montgomery ordered a detachment of troops to seize the Presidio of San Francisco, and confiscate any weaponry they found, which the detachment did without conflict. He also ordered that a military battery be constructed at the foot of Telegraph Hill (this fortification would give its name to San Francisco's Battery Street) and left behind a garrison of 14 troops commanded by Lieutenant Henry B. Watson.

The remainder of the Mexican-American War was uneventful in Yerba Buena, which would soon change its name to San Francisco, as the port was known internationally. The plaza was soon renamed Portsmouth Square in honor of the USS Portsmouth. The next year, when the streets of the new American city of San Francisco were platted, the shoreline road was named Montgomery Street in honor of Commander Montgomery.

== See also ==
- List of battles of the Mexican–American War
