= Interim government of California =

Pre-statehood California government

- Occupied provisional government of the California
- Date formed: 1846
- Date dissolved: 1849

People and organisations
- Military governors of California: John D. Sloat (First); Bennet C. Riley (Last)

History
- Predecessor: California Republic; Department of the Californias
- Successor: State of California

The interim government of California existed from soon after the outbreak of the Mexican–American War in mid-1846 until U.S. statehood in September, 1850. There were three distinct phases:

- The first phase was from the beginning of the wartime military occupation until cession of California to the United States in 1848 by the Treaty of Guadalupe Hidalgo. The occupied areas included Alta California (occupied on July 7, 1846) and the Baja California Peninsula (occupied in 1847). Government during that period was essentially martial law.
- The second phase began with the 1848 cession. The area that is now the U.S. state of California became part of a U.S. territory, and the Baja peninsula was returned to Mexico. In the U.S. California (which consisted of what was Alta California), existing local government structures were largely left in place, but the military presence remained, and the military governors retained absolute authority to overrule any local decision.
- Transition to the third phase of interim government began with approval of the first California Constitution by a constitutional convention in October, 1849, which defined the boundaries of the current state; followed in November by the election of the first civilian state government in the boundaries of the current state. The transition was completed by the handover of government from military to civilian on December 20.

The 1849 constitutional government anticipated that California's petition to be accepted as a state into the union of United States of America would soon be approved. However, although the last military governor resigned on December 20 in favor of the first elected governor, California remained a de facto quasi-state for the next nine-plus months, awaiting acceptance of the statehood petition by the U.S. Congress. The third and final interim government phase ended when Congress approved the California Statehood Act as part of the Compromise of 1850, making California the 31st state on September 9, 1850.

== Interim governors ==
There were six different military governors during the interim period from 1846 to 1849, followed by one elected civilian governor in 1849–50.

- 1846, July 7–23. United States Navy Commodore John D. Sloat, commander of the U.S. Pacific Fleet, who seized Alta California for the United States.
- 1846, July 23. US Navy Commodore Robert F. Stockton arrived to take over command from the ailing Sloat.
- 1847, January 16 – March 28. Captain John C. Frémont (de facto, appointed by Stockton)
- 1847, March 1. US Army General Stephen Kearny succeeded Stockton, immediately removing Stockton's appointees—including Frémont. Kearny ordered his second-in-command, Colonel Richard Barnes Mason, to relieve Frémont, which happened on March 28.
- 1847, May 31. Kearny appointed Mason to succeed him as commander/governor.
- 1849, February 28. General Percifor F. Smith arrived in San Francisco to assume military command in the Pacific Division, which included California. Smith did not, however, replace Mason as military governor.
- 1849, April 13. Brevet Brigadier General Bennett Riley arrived to succeed Mason as military governor.
- 1849, December 20. Riley ceded the California governorship to Peter H. Burnett, California's first elected civilian governor. Burnett remained as governor into statehood.

== Local government ==
On the local level, the military governors left much of the existing Mexican system in place. The top municipal office remained that of alcalde, which combined judicial and administrative functions. The ayuntamiento was an elected advisory body. The juez de pais (justice of the peace) handled minor judicial matters and law enforcement in the towns, and the juez de campo (judge of the countryside) settled rural matters of cattle ownership, branding, etc. For some of the larger settlements, the military governor assigned a lieutenant or non-commissioned officer to be prefecto (similar to a prefect in modern France), as his direct representative.

In addition to his appointment of Captain Frémont to be governor, Commodore Stockton appointed a civilian, William H. Russell, as Secretary of State. He also appointed (January 18) a 7-man civilian legislative assembly, which was ordered to convene in Los Angeles on March 1, 1847. Appointees were: Mariano Guadalupe Vallejo, David Spence, Juan Bautista Alvarado, Thomas O. Larkin, Eliab Grimes, Santiago Arguello, and Juan Bandini. With Stockton's departure, however, the council idea was dropped and the council never met.

Stockton left no doubt, however, about who was in command. On August 17, he issued a proclamation, stating that "...military law will prevail, and the commander in chief will be the governor...". He also proclaimed that elections would be held on September 15 for local officials, but he replaced/appointed many prior to that date. All of Stockton's appointees were confirmed by election. Stockton went so far as to write a state constitution, which he sent to Secretary of the Navy George Bancroft for approval, but never proclaimed or published it in California. He was presumably waiting for approval from Washington, which never came because Kearny had already been chosen to take over command.

Another Stockton move, in September, was to divide the occupied territory into three military districts. District commanders were assigned, each having authority within their defined geographical areas. Commanders appointed were Captain John B. Montgomery (north); Lt. William A. T. Maddox (central); Captain Archibald H. Gillespie (south).

American alcaldes were confirmed, or new ones appointed, to replace local officials left from Mexican governance whose loyalty to the occupation forces was questioned. Alcaldes appointed by Stockton included: Jonathan Temple and Alexander Bell (Los Angeles); Thomas M. Robbins (Santa Barbara); Antoine Robidoux (San Bernardino); José Francisco Ortega (a Californio) and John Finch (San Diego); George Hyde (San Jose); Lt. Washington Allon Bartlett and José de Jesús Noé (Yerba Buena); Walter Colton (Monterey).

== Kearny succeeds Stockton ==
On February 8, 1847, Kearny and his troops arrived in Monterey by ship from San Diego. There, Kearny met Stockton's recently arrived replacement, Commodore William Branford Shubrick. After reading Kearny's orders, Shubrick recognized him as commanding officer on land in California, with Shubrick replacing Stockton as commander of naval forces. Shubrick's authority also included administration of customs and tariffs at ports of entry. Shubrick and Kearny issued a joint circular on March 1, describing this new division of authority.

Kearny also found in Monterey some much-needed army reinforcements. An artillery unit (Battery F, 3rd U.S. Artillery) had arrived from New York by sea, shortly after Shubrick. Among its officers were Lt. William T. Sherman, Lt. Henry W. Halleck, and Lt. Edward Ord, who all became important subordinates to Kearny and his army successors.

On the same day, March 1, 1847, General Kearny issued a "Proclamation to the People of California". Despite its conciliatory tone, it declared, his intention to "take charge of the civil government". Like his predecessors, Kearny remained a military commander who ran the government of the occupied territory through direct orders, not through civil government processes. Like Stockton, Kearny left local matters largely to locally elected officials operating in the pre-existing Mexican system.

== Frémont interlude ==
One of the most controversial episodes of this period, occurring immediately after Kearny took command, was the disputed Frémont governorship. Due to a combination of slow communications, overlapping command authority, and the egos of Kearny, Stockton and Frémont, the situation remained unresolved for months. Although Stockton appointed Frémont to be governor on January 16, 1847, the appointment was soon rescinded when Kearny succeeded Stockton in February.

Frémont met with Kearny on March 26, and agreed to give up the governorship, but then returned to his Los Angeles headquarters. Only after repeated refusals to meet with his successor Colonel Mason (sent by Kearny to take over military command of the area), which resulted in a near-duel, did Frémont finally give up his office to Mason. Kearny, angry at the insubordination, later had Frémont arrested and court-martialed. He was found not guilty of mutiny - the most serious charge - but was convicted on several lesser charges related to insubordination, and received a dishonorable discharge from the army. Frémont's career was saved, however, by President James K. Polk. Though stopping short of pardoning Frémont, Polk commuted the sentence and reversed the discharge.

Historians remain divided in their opinions of the principals in this episode. Frémont biographer Allan Nevins faulted Frémont for his insubordinate behavior, but contended that Kearny's heavy-handed style was mainly to blame. Others see a combination of factors. Frémont was, in fact, convicted of insubordination in a court-martial, by a panel of army officers not involved in the California affair. That much is not in dispute. Historian Theodore Grivas wrote that "It does not seem quite clear how Frémont, an army officer, could have imagined that a naval officer [Stockton] could have protected him from a charge of insubordination toward his superior officer [Kearny]". Grivas goes on to say, however, that "This conflict between Kearny, Stockton and Frémont perhaps could have been averted had methods of communication been what they are today." Mary Lee Spence and Donald Jackson, editors of a large collection of letters by Fremont and others dating from this period, closely studied these events (including the court-martial), concluding that "...in the California episode, Frémont was as often right as wrong. And even a cursory investigation of the court-martial record produces one undeniable conclusion: neither side in the controversy acquitted itself with distinction."

== Kearny and Mason ==
Recognizing the need for communication with the native Californian peoples, on April 6 Kearny appointed Mariano G. Vallejo and John A. Sutter as Indian sub-agents to treat directly with the indigenes on behalf of the United States.

In April 1847, the 1st Regiment of New York Volunteers, arrived as US Army reinforcements, also replacing the Mormon Battalion, whose members were nearing the end of their one-year enlistments (July 15). Kearny split the regiment into three parts - two assigned as district garrisons, and the third assigned to newly occupied territory in the Baja California peninsula. The New York volunteers, under their regular-Army officers, replaced Stockton's departing Navy and Marine detachments. Regimental commander Colonel Jonathan D. Stevenson, at Los Angeles, became the southern district commander. Regimental second-in-command Major James A. Hardie, at Sonoma, became the northern district commander. Third-in-command Lt. Col. Henry S. Burton went to Baja California.

On May 31, Kearny appointed Colonel Mason to succeed him as military governor, and returned overland to St. Louis, ordering Frémont to accompany him as far as Fort Leavenworth, along with 19 of the remaining 60 regular army soldiers who had accompanied Frémont's third surveying expedition, which had first arrived in California in 1845. At Fort Leavenworth, Kearny had Frémont arrested and ordered to report for court-martial in Washington.

One of Mason's first local-government actions demonstrated the absolute authority of the military governor over civil affairs. In June 1847, Mason had to deal with a situation not resolved before Kearny's departure. Kearny had ordered that a locally elected alcalde at Sonoma, John H. Nash, be replaced by Kearny's choice, Lilburn W. Boggs (previously governor of Missouri). Nash and the Sonomans refused, challenging the military governor's authority over local civilian officials. Back at Headquarters in Monterey, Lt. William T. Sherman volunteered to go to Sonoma and bring Nash back to Monterey, so that Mason could explain the situation. This he successfully accomplished, Nash resigned in favor of Boggs, and no further military action was required.

Soon after, to provide administrative help in California civil affairs, Mason appointed Lt. Sherman as Assistant Adjutant General, and Lt. Henry W. Halleck as Secretary of State—specializing in legal and land matters. During this time, when the limits of U.S. government authority on the Pacific coast were still unclear, Halleck became an expert in international and maritime law, writing an authoritative book on the subject.

== California becomes part of the U.S. ==
On February 2, 1848, the Treaty of Guadalupe Hidalgo was signed (but not announced in California until August 7), officially ending the war. Previously occupied territory under the rules of war, California's legal status changed as part of the lands ceded to the U.S. by the terms of the treaty. As a result of becoming an official part of the US, laws promulgated by the military government in California had to conform to the Constitution. National laws such as tariffs were automatically extended to California, but local municipal laws remained in effect.

Another effect of the peace treaty was that most of the soldiers in California, being volunteers, were discharged under the terms of their enlistments, leaving only two companies of regulars in all of California (at some point, a second regular army company had arrived in California, probably detached (as was the first) from Kearny's regiment at Santa Fe). In a letter dated August 18, 1848, military commander/governor Mason stated that his total non-volunteer forces consisted of "two companies of regulars...". The first volunteer unit to arrive, The Mormon Battalion had already left, as had many members of Frémont's California Battalion, and only the 1st Regiment of New York Volunteers remained close to full-strength at war's end.

Maintenance of order became even more difficult with the beginning of the California Gold Rush. By the summer of 1848, news of the discovery had reached most of California, and desertion began to be a problem even in the regular military. Colonel Mason conducted an inspection of the gold fields, and sent a report to his superiors in Washington. The publication of Mason's report, on August 17, 1848, announced the discovery to the world, which kicked the California Gold Rush into high gear. With diminishing numbers of troops available to deal with a rapidly increasing population of treasure-hunting immigrants, the New York volunteer regiment's regular Army commander, Colonel Stevenson, attempted to recruit a volunteer militia in Los Angeles to replace some of his departed New York volunteers.

== State government before statehood ==
By the time Brevet Brigadier General Bennett Riley arrived to succeed Mason (April 13, 1849), who had asked months earlier to be relieved, several of the larger settlements had held un-sanctioned elections, and the gold-rush-induced population growth made the need for statewide law and civilian governance ever more critical. In booming San Francisco, competing groups claimed elected legitimacy, leading Riley, on May 6, to suspend the San Francisco alcalde Thaddeus Leavenworth, who was charged by a newly created and elected "Legislative Assembly" with maladministration.

To help Americans understand the Mexican system of local governance (still in effect), Riley commissioned an English translation of the Mexican laws in effect prior to the war

Learning that Congress had again adjourned for the summer of 1849 without action on California, Riley—on his own authority—issued a proclamation calling for a Constitutional Convention. The proclamation outlined the procedures to be followed. Delegates were elected on August 1; a Constitutional Convention was convened in Monterey on September 3; and elections approved the new constitution, a civilian executive, and legislators on November 13.

General Riley ceded the California governorship to Peter H. Burnett in his final proclamation on December 20: "A new executive having been elected and installed into office, in accordance with the provisions of the constitution of the State, the undersigned hereby resigns his power as governor of California...". With Riley's proclamation, California had a state constitution, a state government, and a state governor, but was not yet a state. During the next nearly eight-plus months of quasi-statehood, the elected government tried to act like a state. Despite previous rumors of brewing revolt against military rule, the elections seem to have largely quashed sentiments to have California remain an independent republic, as Texas had briefly been. Governor Burnett stated that: "There was not the slightest ground for the charge that the people of California desired to establish an independent government."

In 1850, Congress finally approved California statehood, as part of what became known as the "Compromise of 1850." President Millard Fillmore signed the bill into law on September 9, 1850.

== Interim years timeline ==
- 1846, April 24. A Mexican attack across the Rio Grande initiated the Mexican–American War.
- 1846, June 14. Capture of Sonoma Barracks by US immigrant settler militia began the Bear Flag Revolt.
- 1846, July 5. Captain John C. Frémont arrived at Sonoma and absorbed the rebels into his California Battalion volunteers.
- 1846, July 7. Commodore Sloat landed marines to occupy Monterey and raise the U.S. flag, becoming head of government in occupied territory under the rules of war. In the next few days, Sloat appointed naval officers to command occupation of Yerba Buena (soon to be renamed San Francisco), Sonoma, and San Jose.
- 1846, July 15. Navy Commodore Robert F. Stockton arrived at Monterey, taking over command of occupation forces from Sloat on July 23.
- 1846, July 19. Frémont arrived in Monterey to confer with Sloat, who dismissed Frémont and his troops, refusing to muster them into U.S. occupation forces. Stockton, however, reversed Sloat's decision and reinstated Frémont as California Battalion leader, under his Navy command (although Frémont himself remained an army officer).
- 1846, August 13. Stockton's navy/marines force took possession of Los Angeles, following Frémont's taking of San Diego.
- 1846, August 17. Stockton proclamation.
- 1846, September 15. Date set by Stockton for local elections.
- 1846, September 27. Southern Californians revolted against Gillespie while Stockton and Frémont were in the north. General Stephen Kearny arrived from Santa Fe but, not knowing of the revolt, brought only one company (numbering about 100). Kearny's force was defeated by the Californians at the Battle of San Pasqual, east of San Diego.
- 1847, Jan. 10. The revolt effectively ended with the Battle of Rio San Gabriel. Californian commander Andres Pico withdrew and ceased hostilities, and Stockton-Kearny forces re-entered Los Angeles. When Stockton refused to cede command authority, Kearny withdrew his troops to San Diego to await reinforcements.
- 1847, January 16. Stockton appointed Frémont "civilian" governor.
- 1847, January 29. The 300+ man Mormon Battalion of volunteers arrived in San Diego, coming overland from Santa Fe. The reinforcements allowed Kearny to move to Monterey.
- 1847, January 22. Commodore Shubrick arrived in Monterey by ship.
- 1847, February 12. Colonel Richard Barnes Mason arrived at Monterey to become Kearny's second-in-command, bearing orders from Washington reiterating Kearny's authority.
- 1847, March 1. Kearny "Proclamation to the People of California".
- 1847, March 26. Frémont met with Kearny in Monterey, finally agreeing to obey the March 1 Proclamation.
- 1847, March 28. Kearny sent Mason to Los Angeles to relieve Frémont, whose 50-day tenure as de facto governor came to an end.

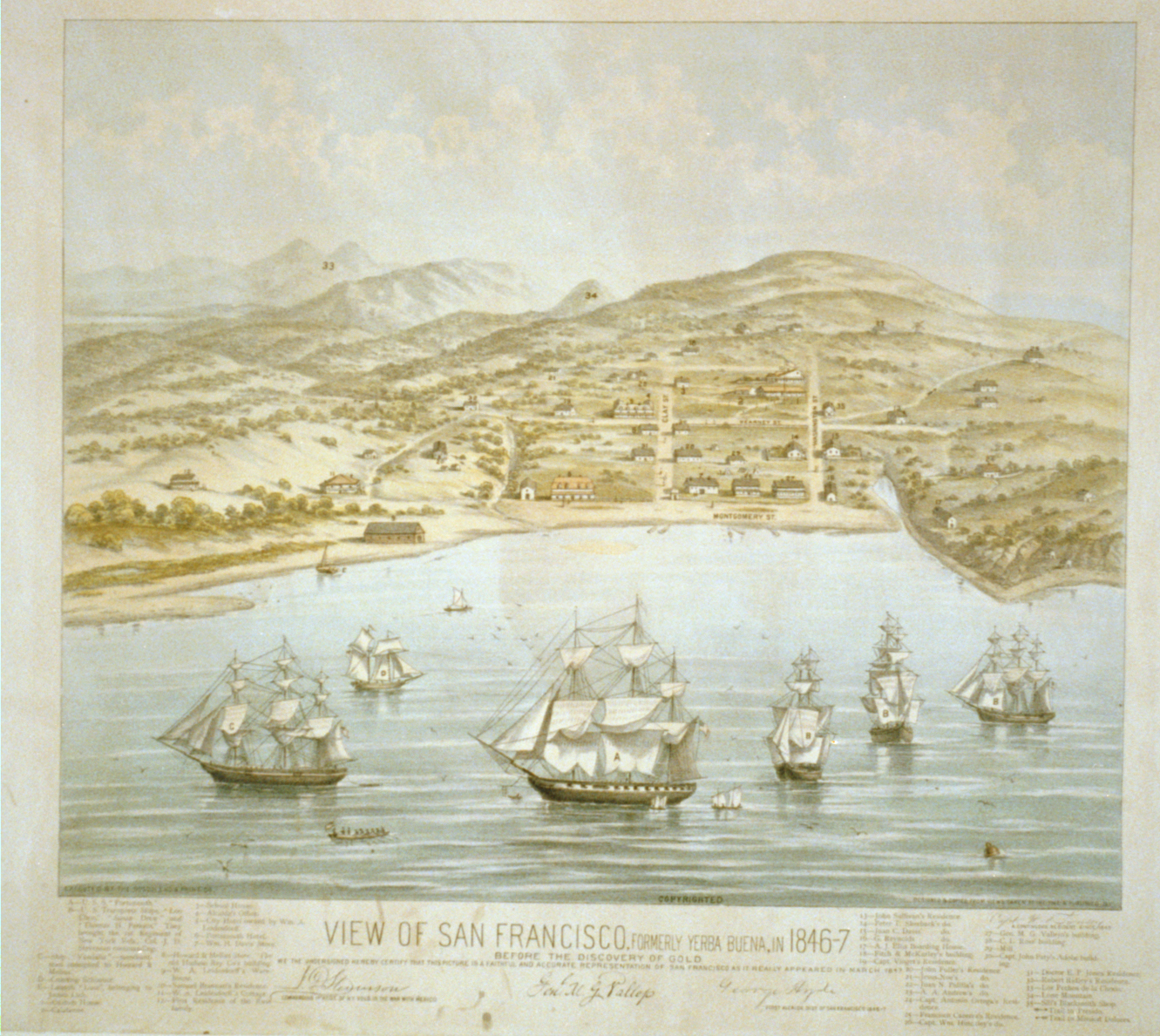
View of San Francisco in 1847, as the 1st Regiment of New York Volunteers arrived

- 1847, April. 1st Regiment of New York Volunteers, under Colonel Stevenson, arrived in San Francisco by sea.
- 1847, May 31. Kearny appointed Colonel Mason to succeed him as military governor.
- 1848, January 24. Gold discovered at Sutter's Mill, initiating the California gold rush.
- 1848, February 2. Treaty of Guadalupe Hidalgo ended the war. California ceded to the U.S., the Baja peninsula returned to Mexico.
- 1849, February 28. General Percifor F. Smith arrived in San Francisco to assume overall military command in the Pacific Division, including California. Smith did not, however, replace Mason as military governor of California.
- 1849, April 13. Brevet Brigadier General Bennett Riley arrived to succeed Mason as military governor.
- 1849, June 3. General Riley called for a Constitutional Convention.
- 1849, November 13. Elections approved the new constitution, a civilian executive and legislators, and various local officials.
- 1849, December 20, General Riley ceded the California governorship to Peter H. Burnett.
- 1850, September 9. California statehood ends interim government period.
