= John M. Horner =

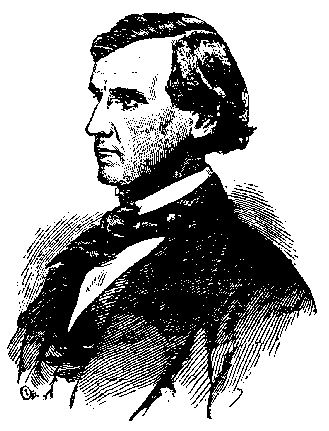
- Born: John Meirs Horner; June 15, 1821; Monmouth, New Jersey
- Died: May 14, 1907 (aged 85); Kukaiau, Kamakua, Hawaii
- Occupation: Farmer
- Known for: creating the current Noe Valley neighborhood in San Francisco. Horner founded Union City, CA in 1850 with his brother William Horner. They named the city after their Sacramento River Steamship, "The Union".
- Spouse: Elizabeth Imlay
- Children: Robert Horner, William Horner
- Parent(s): Stacy Horner, Sarah Johnson

John Meirs Horner (1821–1907) was a key figure in the early history of San Francisco and southern Alameda County, California, especially what is now Fremont, California, and Union City.

== Early life ==
John Meirs Horner was born on June 15, 1821, in Monmouth, New Jersey to Stacy and Sarah Horner (née Johnson). He was a member of the Church of Jesus Christ of Latter-day Saints, having been baptized Aug 2, 1840, by Erastus Snow. He was serving in New Jersey on Joseph Smith's presidential campaign when he learned Smith had been killed. He first arrived in California on the ship Brooklyn in 1846 with a group of Mormons led by Sam Brannan.

== Career ==
He had been a teacher and farmer in New Jersey and quickly took up farming in California quickly became one of California's premier agriculturists, despite being swindled into buying the same land four times and then losing much of it to squatters (according to his own account).

In 1847, he began farming in the vicinity of Mission San Jose. Although he briefly tried mining in 1848, he realized that there was more potential in farming. By 1849, he was making a profit at selling his produce. He was also connected with early agricultural fairs in California designed to encourage others to be involved in growing produce.

He built a building to be used as a school and meetinghouse. Although he allowed Methodists and Presbyterians to hold meetings there, the main meetings conducted there at which he presided were of The Church of Jesus Christ of Latter-day Saints. This building has been called the first LDS meetinghouse in California.

=== San Francisco ===
Horner was one of the Mormons who were passengers on the ship The Brooklyn that sailed into Yerba Buena (early name for San Francisco) in 1846. In 1854, Horner purchased a portion of the Rancho San Miguel from José de Jesús Noé, in what is called the western Mission District of San Francisco and parts of Noe Valley. By the 1860s Homestead associations were popular in San Francisco as a way for persons of modest means to pool their money and purchase large tracts of land to be subdivided, and for early speculators to acquire groups of lots and even entire blocks for later development. Horner platted his lands (in what is now the Mission District) as blocks and lots, named his new streets based on personal and religious influences, and advertised residential property for sale in Horner's Addition. However very few of his lots sold, due to the hilly terrain, poor access, and economic downturns. Horner lost his entire fortune in the panic of 1857 and was forced to liquidate his land holdings.

In 1895, descendants of José de Jesús Noé filed a San Francisco lawsuit involving $24,000,000.00 against Horner, stating a percentage of the land in Horner's Addition was legally theirs.

== Death and legacy ==
He died on May 14, 1907, at age 91 in Kukaiau, Hamakua, Hawaii where he had managed the Kukaiau Plantation Company starting in 1884.

John M. Horner Middle School in Fremont, California is his namesake.

== See also ==
- The Church of Jesus Christ of Latter-day Saints in California
- The Church of Jesus Christ of Latter-day Saints in Hawaii
