= Ygnacio Martínez =

Californio soldier and politician

4th Alcalde of San Francisco
- In office 1837–1838
- Preceded by: Francisco Guerrero y Palomares
- Succeeded by: Francisco de Haro

Personal details
- Born: 1774
- Died: 1848 (aged 73–74)
- Resting place: Mission San José
- Spouse: Martina Arellanes

Ygnacio Nicanor Martínez (1774–1848) was a Californio politician, soldier, and ranchero, who served as the fourth Alcalde of San Francisco (then known as Yerba Buena). He was an important figure in the development of Contra Costa and the city of Martinez, California is named after him.

== Life ==
Ygnacio Martínez was born in Mexico City, New Spain (now Mexico), and was a soldier in Alta California by 1822. In 1827, as a lieutenant stationed at the Presidio of San Francisco, Martínez met with the American explorer Jedediah Smith and helped to facilitate the continuation of Smith's northward travels toward the Columbia River.

Martínez was the fourth Alcalde of Yerba Buena (now San Francisco) in 1837. In 1842, he was granted the Rancho El Pinole, which included the Alhambra Valley. A portion of the rancho later became part of the city of Martinez.

== Family ==
Martínez married Maria Martina Arellanes in 1802, and the couple had eleven children: nine daughters and two sons. One of the daughters, Maria Antonia Martinez (1803–1887), married William A. Richardson in 1825.

Ygnacio Martínez died in June, 1848, in the area that would become Contra Costa County, and is buried at Mission San Jose Cemetery in Fremont, California.

== Legacy ==
The city of Martinez, California, which serves as the county seat of Contra Costa County, was named after Ygnacio Martínez by his son-in-law, William M. Smith, founder of the city.
