= Streetlight Records =

Record shops in Santa Cruz

- Company type: Private company - Record shop
- Industry: Music industry
- Founded: 1975; 50 years ago (Noe Valley, San Francisco, United States); 1979; 46 years ago (2350 Market Street, Castro District, San Francisco)
- Founder: Robert Fallon
- Headquarters: 939 Pacific Ave, Santa Cruz, California, 95060; 980 S Bascom Ave, San Jose, CA 95128 (currently); 2350 Market St, San Francisco, CA 94114 (formerly), United States
- Number of locations: 4 (formerly); 2 (currently)
- Area served: San Francisco Bay Area
- Key people: Robert Fallon (founder)
- Products: Stereo parts (formerly); Records (currently)
- Website: streetlightrecords.com

Streetlight Records is an American chain of record shops located on Pacific Avenue in Santa Cruz, California and San Jose, California.

== History ==
In 1975, the original Streetlight Records was opened for business as a stereo components store by Robert Fallon in Noe Valley in San Francisco. The store shifted focus to music sales after customers made it clear that is what they preferred. Four years later in 1979, Fallon opened a second location on Market Street in San Francisco followed by a third location in San Jose in 1981 and a fourth location in Santa Cruz in 1997.

On January 20, 2015, Streetlight Records announced it would be closing its location on 2350 Market Street in San Francisco after 35 years in business. On November 24, 2017, manager of the Santa Cruz location, Roger Weiss, cited the owner's wish to keep the record industry alive. A supportive customer base and a surge of sales due to Record Store Day as reasons they have stayed in business.
