= Washington Allon Bartlett =

American politician

- Engraving by John Chester Buttre, from a painting by William Smith Jewett, 1857

Alcalde of San Francisco
- In office August 22, 1846 – February 22, 1847
- Succeeded by: Edwin Bryant

Personal details
- Born: c. 1816 Maine, United States
- Died: February 6, 1865 (aged 48–49) Brooklyn Heights, Brooklyn, New York City, New York
- Profession: Naval officer, surveyor

Military service
- Allegiance: United States
- Branch/service: United States Navy
- Years of service: 1833-1855, 1861

Washington Allon Bartlett (c. 1816 – February 6, 1865) was an American surveyor who was the first U.S. citizen to serve as alcalde of Yerba Buena/San Francisco, appointed by the military government during the Mexican-American War and serving from August 14, 1846, to January 31, 1847.

== Early years ==
While some sources state that Bartlett was born in Maine, citing dates of September 3, 1812 to 1820, other sources have stated he was related to Josiah Bartlett, a signatory of the United States Declaration of Independence; however, there is no independent evidence for either proposition. Much of the biographical data regarding Bartlett in the period before 1856 is found in a memorial he submitted to Congress. He was originally appointed as a midshipman in the United States Navy on January 22, 1833, having had some previous at-sea nautical training. Between 1833 and 1837, Bartlett served on board the sloop USS Vincennes on a lengthy Pacific Ocean cruise. On July 8, 1839, he passed seventh in a class of 32 in examinations for the rank of passed midshipman. Between 1839 and 1844, he was principally engaged in surveying duties, until he was commissioned a Lieutenant in the U.S. Navy in November 1844, at which time he joined the sloop USS Portsmouth for a cruise which lasted until May 1848.

== Mayor of San Francisco ==
It was during this cruise that Bartlett achieved his greatest professional fame. The Mexican–American War broke out during this cruise. Commodore John D. Sloat claimed California for the United States on July 7, 1846, and Commander John B. Montgomery of USS Portsmouth arrived at the coastal village of Yerba Buena on July 9, 1846 to take control of the area for the United States.

As Lieutenant Bartlett was a fluent speaker of Spanish, and was well read in legal matters, he was detailed by Commander Montgomery on August 14, 1846, to represent the military government as alcalde at Yerba Buena, in a position functionally similar to the office of prefect in the Mexican system. Bartlett served concurrently with a civilian (also appointed), José de Jesús Noé, who had previously served as alcalde in 1842–43. Accordingly, Lt. Bartlett became the first U.S. citizen to be alcalde (an office combining functions of a strong mayor with those of a municipal court judge), of Yerba Buena.

Lt. Bartlett was elected to succeed himself at the first election held under the new regime, on September 15, 1846. Bartlett was involved in the Donner Party tragedy; upon news being received at Yerba Buena of the disaster, Bartlett collected clothing and provisions to relieve the survivors. For a period of a month in December 1846, he was taken prisoner on December 8, 1846, by "an irregular body of Californians" while on a provisioning expedition.

In one of his last acts as alcalde, Bartlett formally changed the name of Yerba Buena on January 30, 1847 to that by which it is known today: San Francisco. Bartlett resigned the office and rejoined the Portsmouth when the ship received new orders and left the area.

Bartlett, as an experienced surveyor, also ordered the creation of some of the first maps of the city-to-be. Montgomery Street, still a prominent thoroughfare in San Francisco, was named for his commanding officer, and although Bartlett Street is most probably named for him, some say it was for Washington Montgomery Bartlett, who was the twentieth mayor of San Francisco, and later the sixteenth governor of California.

== Pacific Coast Survey ==
Probably due to his familiarity with the West Coast, in 1848 Bartlett was assigned to the Pacific portion of the United States Coast Survey. On January 9, 1849, he left for San Francisco in command of the USS Ewing. The voyage around Cape Horn was grueling, and it took almost seven months; the Ewing arriving in San Francisco on August 1. The Ewing, however, did not remain in San Francisco Bay; Bartlett took it north to Tomales Bay to try to prevent the crew from deserting to the gold fields. It returned on August 6, at which time William Pope McArthur, who had arrived on August 31, took command of her. Bartlett remained on the ship, and sailed with it to Hawaii where they stayed over the winter of 1849–50.

== Later career and scandal ==
In 1852, Bartlett was released from the Survey and spent an extended period of time in Europe purchasing lighthouse equipment on behalf of the Treasury.

In February 1855, Bartlett once again went to sea, for service as a first lieutenant and executive officer of the flagship of the African squadron. This service was not to be long, for in September 1855, Bartlett was struck from the Navy List by a naval board. Upon an enquiry by the wife of Lt. Bartlett, it was noted that no charges had been preferred against any officers so struck.

Lt. Bartlett, upon his return to the United States, engaged in vigorous efforts to be restored to the Navy List, including the presentation in 1856 of a lengthy "Memorial" to Congress which outlined his service. To a certain extent, the Memorial was focused on rebutting charges that Lt. Bartlett had been engaged in financial irregularities when acting as agent for the Treasury, and when an officer in the African squadron. As of 1859, Lt. Bartlett had not been restored to service; Bartlett was granted leave to withdraw his petition to be restored to service by the U.S. Senate on March 13, 1857.

== "Diamond Wedding" ==
The daughter of Lt. Bartlett, Frances Amelia Bartlett, married Don Esteban Santa Cruz de Oviedo, a wealthy Cuban landowner and slave-owner, in a lavish ceremony at St. Patrick's Cathedral (now St. Patrick's Old Cathedral) on Mott Street in New York on October 13, 1859. The wedding was soon known as "The Diamond Wedding," in part because of the allegedly lavish gifts of jewelry given by the 55-year-old Oviedo to his 18-year-old bride. The name was also attached to a satirical poem written by Edmund Clarence Stedman which appeared in The New York Tribune, which so enraged the father of the bride that an apology or "satisfaction" was demanded. Neither a duel nor the threatened lawsuit ever came to pass.

The marriage lasted until Don Esteban's death in February 1870. His widow, in 1882, was subsequently remarried to Bodo von Gluemer, a German engineering officer in the service of the Mexican Army. As of 1904, Frances Amelia Bartlett de Oviedo von Gluemer was still alive, though in significantly reduced circumstances, pursuing claims under the Treaty of Paris, which ended the Spanish–American War, regarding property left to her by her first husband in Cuba.

== Civil War career ==
Upon the outbreak of the Civil War, Bartlett was engaged in raising Bartlett's Naval Brigade for service. However, upon reporting to the area of Fort Monroe, Virginia in the late spring of 1861, the brigade was rejected for service by the commanding officer, Major-General Benjamin F. Butler. Bartlett, who was colonel of the brigade, subsequently suffered a serious injury in a fall, and the brigade was dissolved, portions of it being reformed as the 99th New York Infantry Regiment of the New York militia in August, 1861. Bartlett was subject to serious criticism in the press by some regarding his conduct, one article even noting that some in the brigade questioned his sanity.

Bartlett continued to seek vindication; Senator John P. Hale of New Hampshire is on record as having written to Navy Secretary Gideon Welles regarding Bartlett's case in March 1862. However, there is no record of Bartlett ever receiving vindication. As of 1862, Bartlett was in a partnership practicing civil, marine, naval and steam engineering at 169 Broadway, in New York City.

Bartlett died in Brooklyn Heights, Brooklyn, New York City, in February 1865, and is buried at Green-Wood Cemetery, section 90, lot 772/775, in Brooklyn.
