= Francisco Guerrero y Palomares =

Californio soldier and politician (1811–1851)

3rd Alcalde of San Francisco
- In office 1836–1837
- Preceded by: José Joaquín Estudillo
- Succeeded by: Ygnacio Martínez

6th Alcalde of San Francisco
- In office 1839–1842
- Preceded by: Francisco de Haro
- Succeeded by: José de Jesús Noé

Personal details
- Born: 1811
- Died: 13 July 1851 (aged 39–40) San Francisco
- Resting place: Mission Dolores
- Spouse: Josefa de Haro

Francisco Guerrero y Palomares (1811 – 13 July 1851) was a Californio politician and ranchero, who served as the third and sixth Alcalde of San Francisco (then known as Yerba Buena). He was notoriously murdered in 1851 in a scandal involving American prospectors seeking to discredit the land claims of Californios.

== Life ==
Guerrero was born in Tepic, New Spain (colonial México). He came to Alta California with the Hijar-Padres Colony in 1834, and settled in Yerba Buena (San Francisco). He was married to Josefa de Haro (daughter of Alcalde Francisco de Haro), and had five sons.

He was the third Alcalde of Yerba Buena in 1836. Guerrero served again as the sixth Alcalde in 1839.

In 1844 he was granted Rancho Corral de Tierra, located in present-day San Mateo County, California. A section of the land grant is now a part of the Golden Gate National Recreation Area.

Guerrero was murdered under mysterious circumstances on July 12, 1851, in San Francisco. He was riding on the newly constructed Mission Plank Road when he was attacked. The official account states that Guerrero was assaulted by François LeBras, a man described as small, feeble, and generally considered insane. Witnesses reported seeing Guerrero and LeBras arguing and engaging in a scuffle while on horseback. Guerrero fell from his horse and suffered fatal head injuries, dying the next day. However, the circumstances surrounding his death were highly suspicious. The trial that followed was gravely flawed, with key eyewitnesses and medical experts not called to testify. Despite evidence suggesting Guerrero had been struck with a club or slungshot before falling, LeBras was found innocent without the jury even leaving the box. Many believed that Guerrero's murder was orchestrated by American land speculators who wanted to eliminate him as a potential witness against fraudulent land claims. His extensive knowledge of California land titles made him a threat to those seeking to profit from bogus Mexican land grants, particularly the Santillan claim.

Guerrero Street in San Francisco is named in his honor.

== See also ==
- List of pre-statehood mayors of San Francisco
- Ranchos of California
