= Noe Valley, San Francisco =

Noe Valley
- Neighborhood
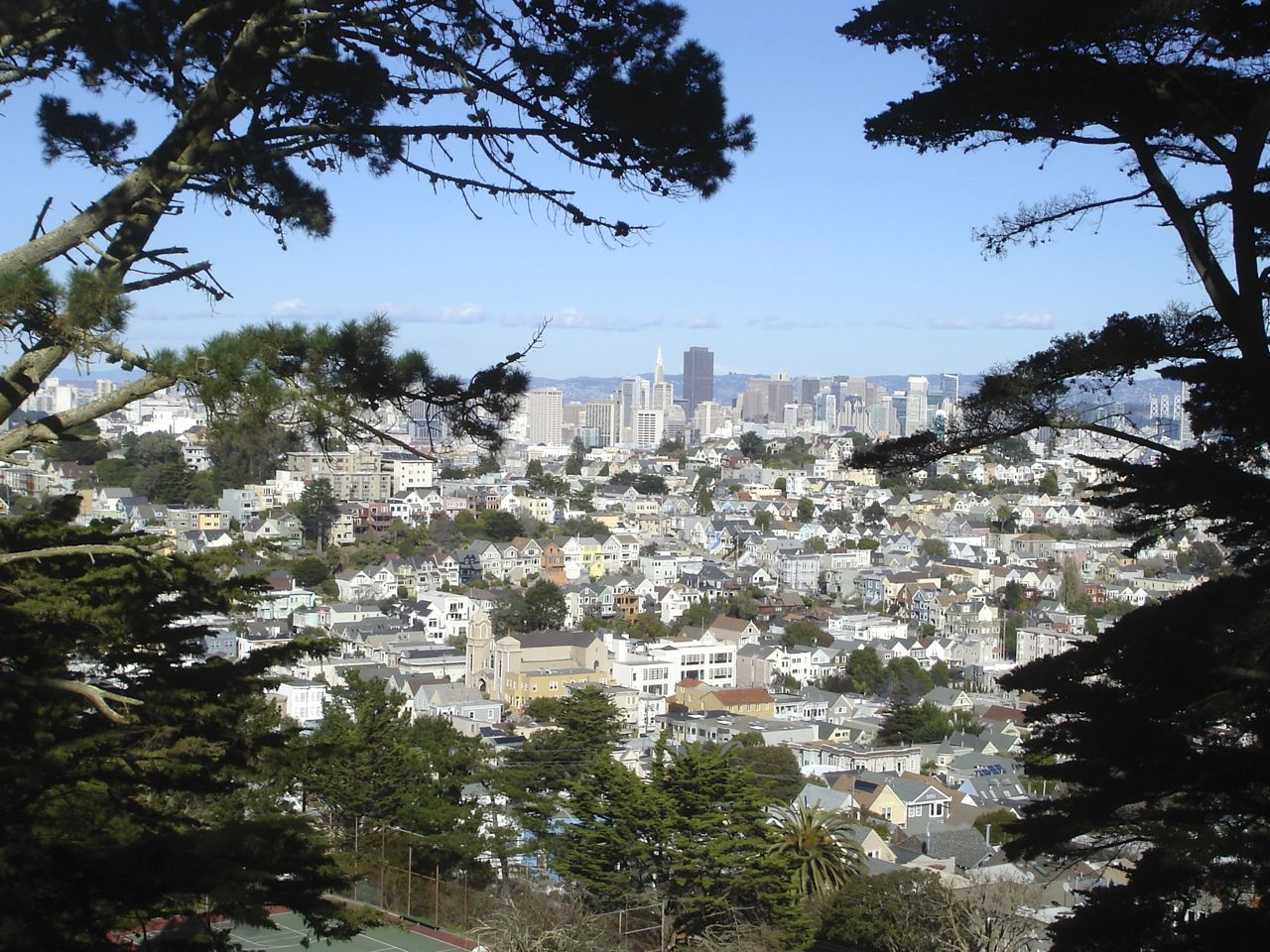
- Noe Valley in 2013

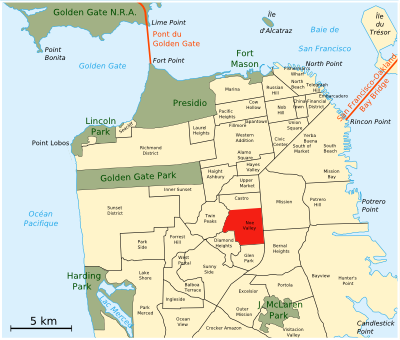
- Location within San Francisco

- Location within Central San Francisco
- Coordinates (24th St. & Noe St.): 37°45′05.2″N 122°25′54.7″W
- Country: United States
- State: California
- City-county: San Francisco

Government
  - Supervisor: Rafael Mandelman
  - Assemblymember: Matt Haney (D)
  - State senator: Scott Wiener (D)
  - U. S. rep.: Nancy Pelosi (D)

Area
  - Total: 0.911 sq mi (2.36 km^{2})
  - Land: 0.911 sq mi (2.36 km^{2})

Population (2019)
  - Total: 22,548
  - Density: 24,750/sq mi (9,560/km^{2})
- Time zone: UTC-8 (Pacific)
  - Summer (DST): UTC-7 (PDT)
- ZIP codes: 94110, 94114, 94131
- Area codes: 415/628

Noe Valley (/ˈnoʊ.i/ NOH-ee; originally spelled Noé) is a neighborhood in central San Francisco, California. It is named for Don José de Jesús Noé, noted 19th-century Californio statesman and ranchero, who owned much of the area and served as mayor.

== Location ==
Roughly speaking, Noe Valley is bounded by 21st Street to the north, 30th Street to the south, San Jose Ave and Guerrero Street to the east, and Grand View Avenue and Diamond Heights Blvd to the west. The Castro (Eureka Valley) is north of Noe Valley; the Mission District is east.

== History ==
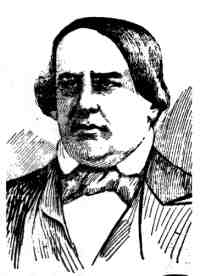
José de Jesús Noé

The neighborhood is named after José de Jesús Noé, the last Mexican alcalde (mayor) of Yerba Buena (present day San Francisco), who owned what is now Noe Valley as part of his Rancho San Miguel. Noé sold the land later known as Noe Valley to John Meirs Horner, a Mormon immigrant, in 1854. At this time the land was called Horner's Addition. The original Noé adobe house was in the vicinity of the present-day intersection of 23rd Street and Douglass Street. Along with nearby neighborhood Corona Heights, Noe Valley was the site of two quarries until 1914.

Noe Valley was primarily developed at the end of the 19th century and the beginning of the 20th century, especially in the years just after the 1906 San Francisco earthquake. As a result, the neighborhood contains many examples of the "classic" Victorian and Edwardian residential architecture for which San Francisco is famous. As a working-class neighborhood, Noe Valley houses were built in rows, with some of the efficient, low-cost homes more ornate than others, depending on the owner's taste and finances. Today, Noe Valley has one of the highest concentration of row houses in San Francisco, with streets having three to four and sometimes as many as a dozen on the same side.

== Gentrification ==
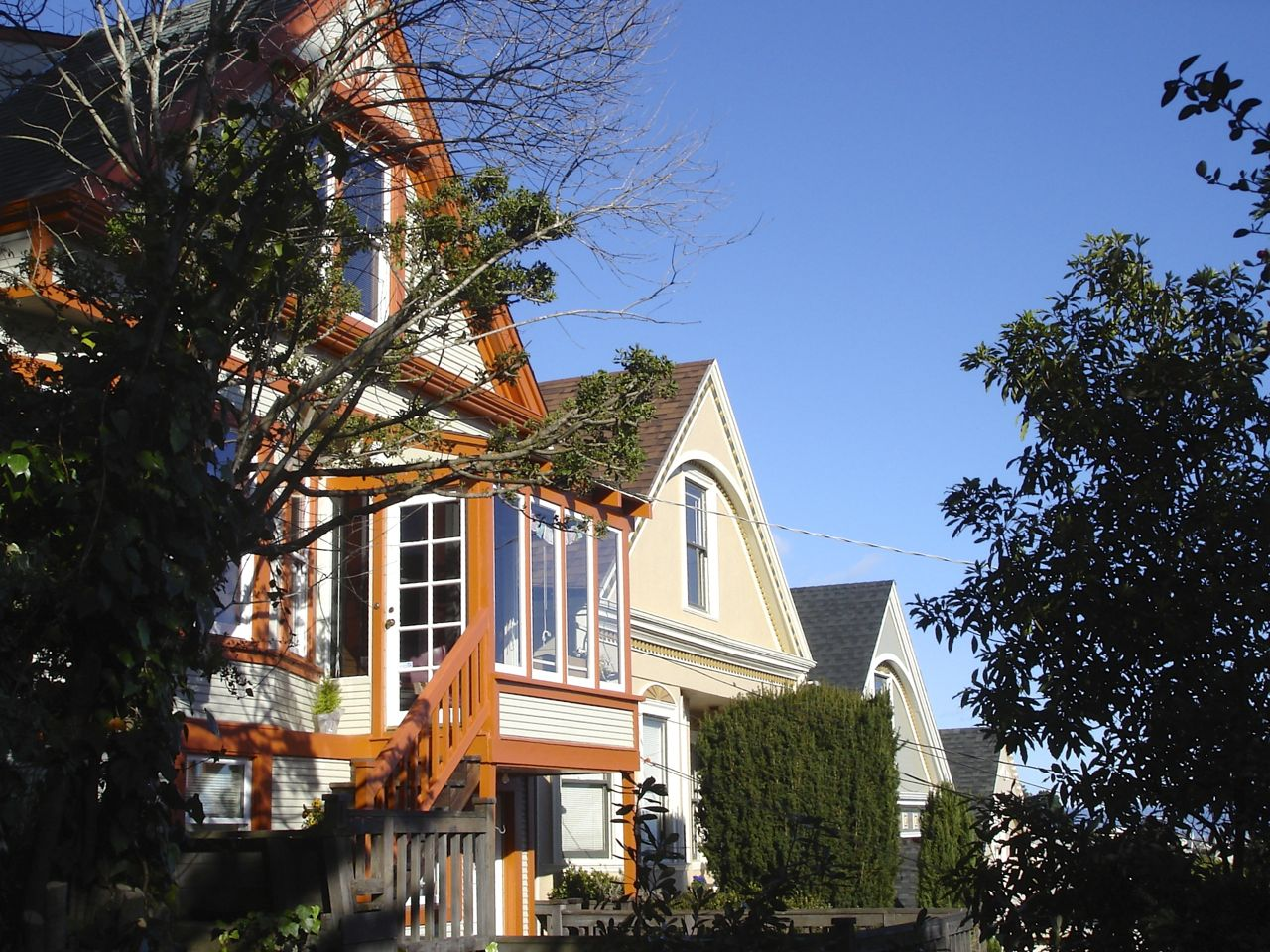
Row houses in Noe Valley

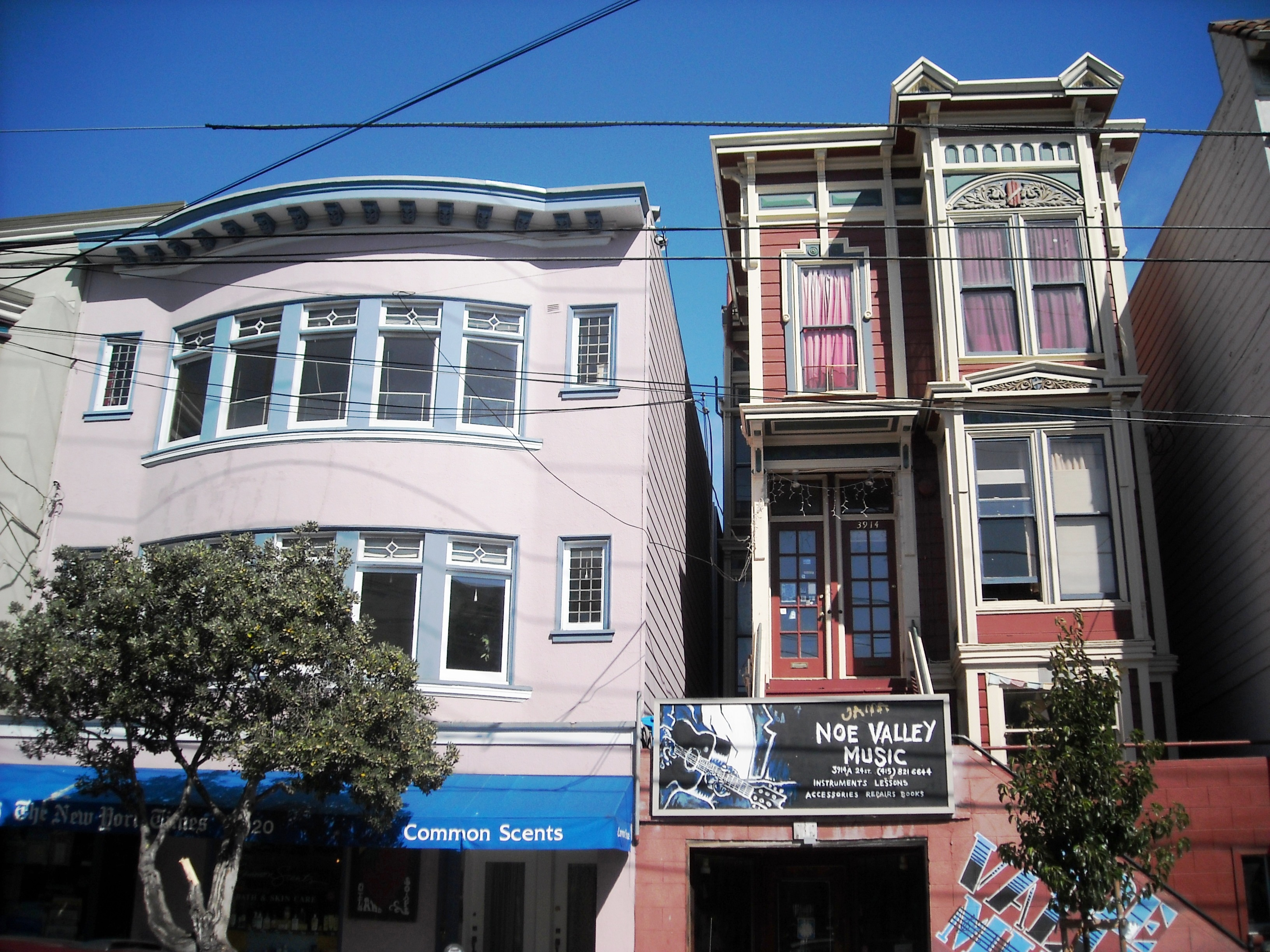
Noe Valley

Like many other San Francisco neighborhoods, Noe Valley started out as a working-class neighborhood for employees and their families in the area's once-thriving blue-collar economy. Since 1980 it has undergone successive waves of gentrification and is now considered an upper-middle class/wealthy neighborhood. It is home to many urban professionals, particularly young couples with children, and is sometimes colloquially known as Stroller Valley. The median sale price for homes in Noe Valley as of January 2026 was $1.94 million.

=== Notable residents ===
Artist Ruth Asawa was a resident of Noe Valley from 1962 until her death in August 2013. Musician Carlos Santana graduated from James Lick Middle School on Noe Street in the early 1960s, as did actor Benjamin Bratt in the 1970s. Other residents include billionaire Evan Williams, political scientist Terry Karl, and Y Combinator CEO Garry Tan.

== See also ==
- Noe Valley public toilet
