= Francisco de Haro =

Mexican politician

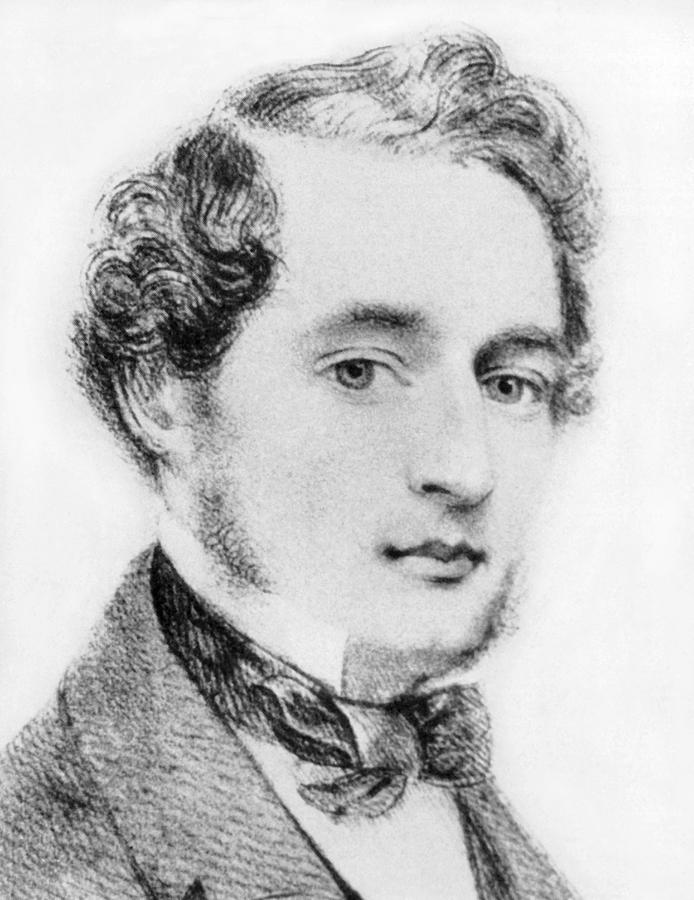

1st and 5th Alcalde of San Francisco
- In office 1838–1839
- Preceded by: Ygnacio Martínez
- Succeeded by: Francisco Guerrero y Palomares
- In office 1834–1835
- Preceded by: Office established
- Succeeded by: José Joaquín Estudillo

Personal details
- Born: 1792 Compostela, New Kingdom of Galicia, New Spain (now Nayarit, Mexico)
- Died: November 28, 1849 (aged 56–57) San Francisco, California
- Resting place: Mission Dolores
- Spouse: Emiliana Sánchez

Francisco de Haro (1792 – November 28, 1849) was a Californio politician, soldier, and ranchero, who served as the 1st and 5th Alcalde of San Francisco (initially known as Yerba Buena). He notably commissioned the first land survey of San Francisco to Jean Jacques Vioget in 1839.

== Biography ==
De Haro was born in Compostela, Nayarit, in the Viceroyalty of New Spain. He came to the Presidio of San Francisco as a soldier in 1819.

De Haro became the first Alcalde (mayor) of the pueblo of Yerba Buena in 1834.

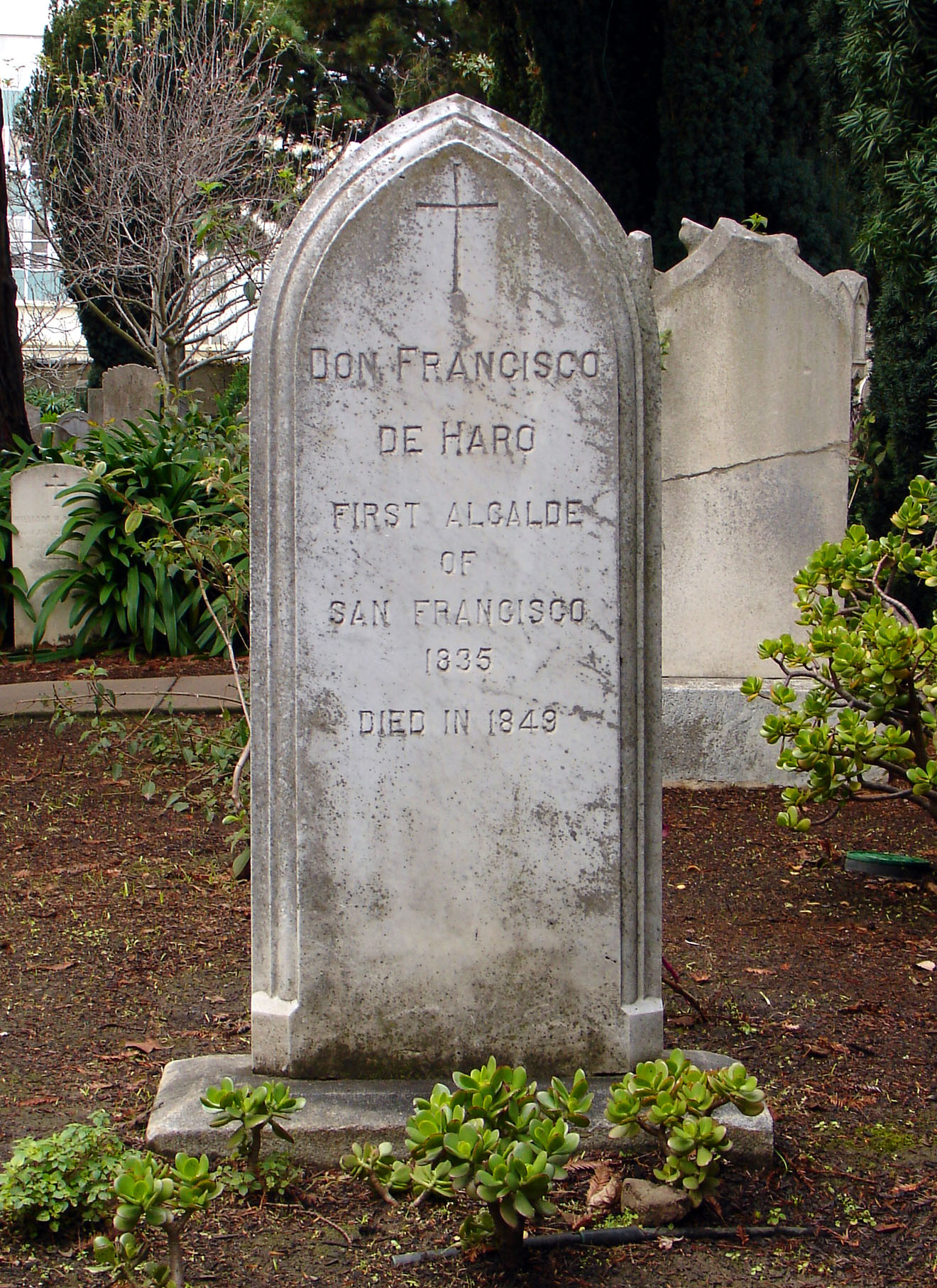
Grave of Francisco de Haro at Mission Dolores Cemetery.

He was instrumental in planning the street grid of the town along with Englishman William A. Richardson in 1835. In 1837, de Haro bought the Rancho Laguna de la Merced, which included Lake Merced and portions of northern San Mateo County, from the grantee José Antonio Galindo. In a strange turn of events, in 1838, Alcalde de Haro issued an arrest warrant for Jose Antonio Galindo for the murder of José Doroteo Peralta (1810–1838). De Haro served again as the fifth Alcalde from 1838 to 1839. He commissioned the first survey of the settlement by Jean Jacques Vioget in 1839.

== Personal life ==
De Haro married Emiliana (Miliana) Sánchez, who was the granddaughter of José Antonio Sanchez, one of the soldiers of the 1775 de Anza expedition. She was the sister of Alcalde Francisco Sanchez and Alcalde José de la Cruz Sánchez. The marriage produced twelve children, including a pair of twin sons and a pair of twin daughters. Miliana Sánchez died in 1842.

The couple's twin sons, Francisco and Ramon de Haro, the 1844 grantees of Rancho Potrero de San Francisco on Potrero Hill, were murdered by Kit Carson at the age of 19 on June 28, 1846, near San Rafael, California, along with their distant cousin José de los Reyes Berreyesa. Kit Carson (and potentially other men) shot the 3 men at the direction of General John C. Frémont.

De Haro died on 28 November 1849 and is buried at the Mission Dolores cemetery in San Francisco.

== Legacy ==
De Haro Street, in the Potrero Hill neighborhood of San Francisco, is named after him. Additionally, the San Francisco Dons have a mascot called Don Francisco that is based on him.
