= Eureka Valley, San Francisco =

Eureka Valley
- Neighborhood of San Francisco
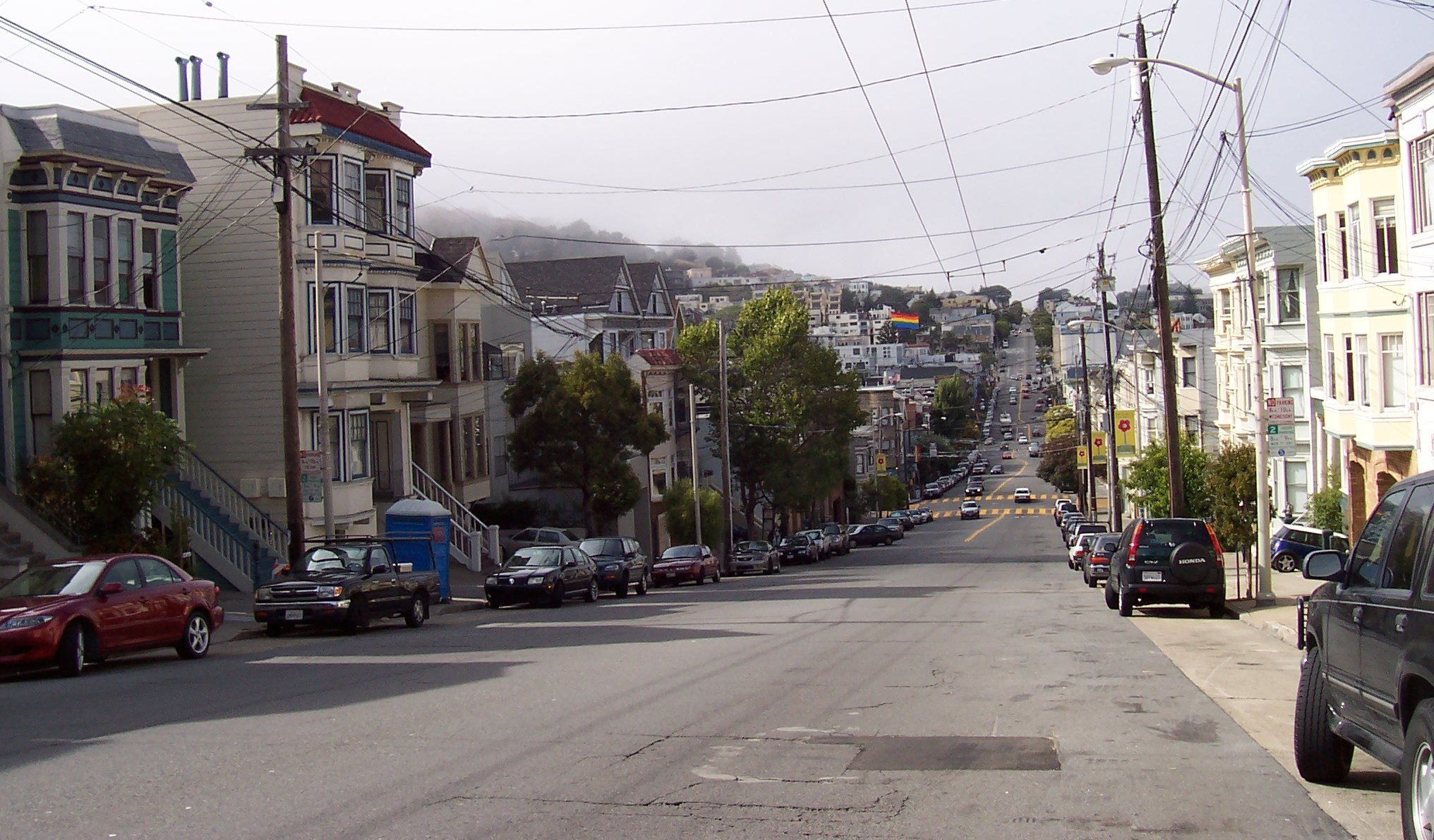
- Eureka Valley, looking north on Castro Street from 20th. The giant rainbow flag at Castro and Market is just visible. In the summer months, fog tends to roll in over Twin Peaks and other hills to the west in the evenings and retreat again the next morning.

- Location within Central San Francisco
- Coordinates: 37.76594°N 122.43093°W

Government
  - Supervisor: Rafael Mandelman
  - State Assembly: Matt Haney (D)
  - State Senator: Scott Wiener (D)
  - U. S. Rep.: Nancy Pelosi (D)

Area
  - Total: 1.71 km^{2} (0.662 sq mi)
  - Land: 1.71 km^{2} (0.662 sq mi)

Population (2008)
  - Total: 12,503
  - Density: 7,290/km^{2} (18,890/sq mi)
- ZIP Code: 94110, 94114
- Area code: 415

Eureka Valley is a neighborhood in San Francisco, primarily a quiet residential neighborhood but boasting one of the most visited sub-neighborhoods in the city, The Castro.

The neighborhood is popular with families and the LGBT community. The rainbow flag, signifying LGBT pride, can be seen displayed throughout the area. It was initially a working-class Irish neighborhood until a combination of factory jobs loss and the migration of gays into the Castro radically changed the neighborhood in the 1960s. In 1977 this district elected Harvey Milk, the first openly gay politician in California, to the San Francisco Board of Supervisors.

== Geography ==
The only official definition of neighborhoods in San Francisco is by the city's Planning Department, which defines, a larger "Castro/Upper Market" neighborhood.

The definition of Eureka Valley by the Castro/Eureka Valley Neighbors Association as well as a 2007 Planning Department study is:

- Sanchez Street on the east
- 22nd Street on the south
- Twin Peaks on the west
- Duboce Avenue on the north

with Noe Valley to the south and Mission District to the east.

It encompasses several micro neighborhoods including The Castro and Duboce Triangle. Neighborhood associations defining sub-neighborhoods within Eureka Valley are: 19th Street (Noe to Sanchez), Buena Vista (BVNA), Corbett Heights, Corona Heights, Dolores Heights (DHIC), Duboce Triangle (DTNA), Hartford Street for Hartford (17th to 18th), and Mission Dolores.

== History ==
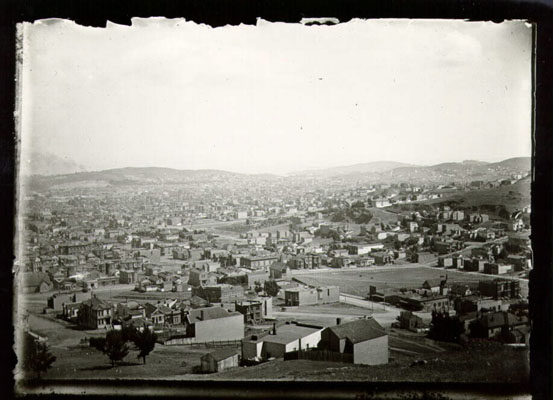
Eureka Valley 1890

In 1845 José de Jesús Noé was granted Rancho San Miguel, four thousand acres (16 km^{2}) stretching from Twin Peaks into Noe and Eureka valleys. In 1854 John M. Horner purchased the ranch and laid out Horner's Addition in a grid bounded by Castro Street on the west, Valencia Street on the east, 18th Street on the north and 30th Street on the south. Eureka Valley was part of the Mission Dolores subdivision but was not developed until the 1890s and the early 1900s.

The opening of the Market & Castro Street Cable Car line in 1886 opened Eureka Valley to development — primarily small wood-frame cottages and two-story flats. The only industry in the area was a mattress factory on the block bounded by Market, Dolores, and Fifteenth streets.

Most residents were working and lower-middle-class tradesmen, small business owners, civil servants, builders, and artisans, with Irish, German, British, and Scandinavian immigrants, as well as some old-stock Americans living in the neighborhood.

Eureka Valley escaped destruction in the 1906 San Francisco earthquake and subsequent fire, mostly because the fires were stopped at Dolores Street. After the 1906 earthquake, thousands of earthquake refugees began purchasing lots and erecting cottages and flats in the area. The momentum continued after the completion of Twin Peaks Tunnel in 1918 and the Municipal Railway's J Church streetcar line in 1917.

The Eureka Valley Improvement Association, founded on September 3, 1905, successfully lobbied the city's Board of Supervisors for many early improvements in the neighborhood, such as improved streetcar service, better lighting, and public school construction. The association was instrumental in preventing the spread of the fires after the 1906 earthquake.

The Eureka Valley branch of the San Francisco Public Library opened in 1902 at the corner of Noe and Seventeenth streets. The original building, damaged in the 1957 Daly City earthquake, was replaced by the current structure in 1962, and refurbished in 2009.

The commercial area of Eureka Valley, centered on the intersection of 18th Street and Castro Street, was transformed in the 1970s with the development of the gay community known as "The Castro."

== Gallery ==
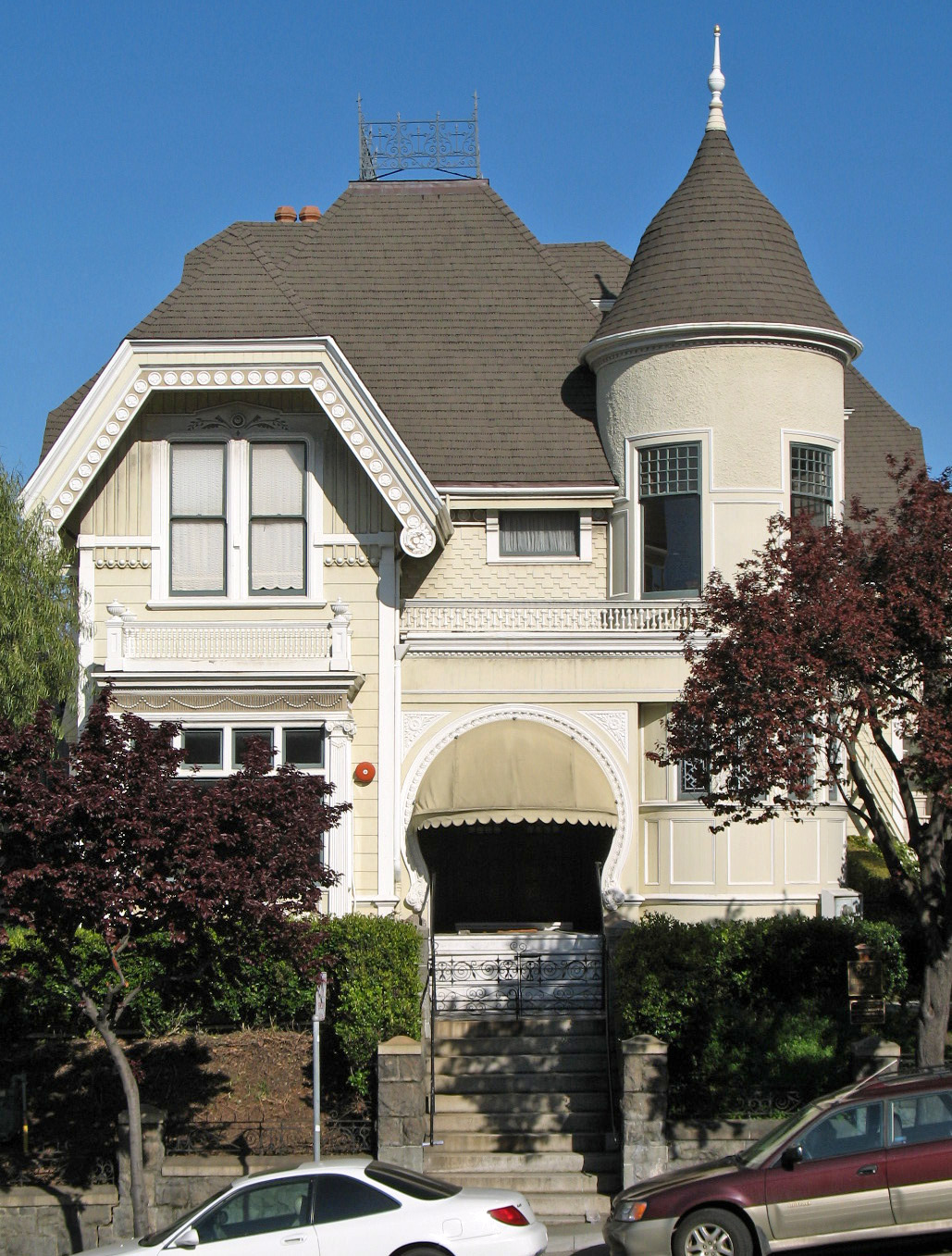
The John McMullen House on Guerrero Street is listed on the National Register of Historic Places
