= Rancho San Miguel (Noé) =

Mexican land grant in California

Coordinates: 37.770°N 122.440°W

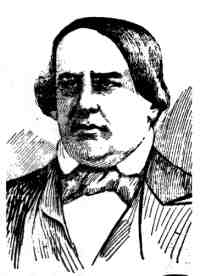
José de Jesús Noé, a wealthy Californio landowner, was granted Rancho San Miguel in 1845.

Rancho San Miguel was a 4,443-acre (17.98 km^{2}) Mexican land grant in present-day San Francisco County, California. The land grant was given in 1845 by Governor Pío Pico to José de Jesús Noé. It included what is now known as Eureka Valley, and extended past Mount Davidson almost to present-day Daly City; it encompassed the present-day San Francisco neighborhoods of Noe Valley, the Castro, Glen Park, Diamond Heights and St. Francis Wood.

== History ==
José de Jesús Noé (1805-1862) was born in Puebla, Mexico. He came to California with his wife, Guadalupe Garduno, in 1834 with the Hijar-Padres Colony. During the last years of Mexican rule in California, he held several administrative posts in San Francisco. He was alcalde in 1842 and in part of 1846. He received the one square league Rancho San Miguel grant in 1845.

With the cession of California to the United States following the Mexican-American War, the 1848 Treaty of Guadalupe Hidalgo provided that land grants would be honored. As required by the Land Act of 1851, a claim for Rancho San Miguel was filed with the Public Land Commission in 1852, and the grant was patented to Noé in 1857.

After his wife died in 1848, leaving three sons, Noé began selling Rancho San Miguel. In 1854, he sold a large part of it to John Meirs Horner and his brother William J. Horner. By the time Noé obtained a US land patent to Rancho San Miguel in 1857, he had already sold much of it. He died in 1862 and passed what remained of the rancho to his children. By 1862, French financier François Louis Alfred Pioche owned most of the rancho, but lost it in a foreclosure sale in 1878. In 1880, former Mayor of San Francisco Adolph Sutro bought the northwesterly portion.

In 1895, Noé's contended that his sale to Horner was illegal, and unsuccessfully sued to have half of the rancho land, their mother's share, restored to them.

== See also ==
- Ranchos of California
- List of Ranchos of California
