= Edward Bosqui =

American artist (1832–1917)

- Born: July 23, 1832; Montreal, Lower Canada
- Died: December 15, 1917 (aged 85)
- Occupations: Artist, printer, businessman
- Organizations: Bohemian Club, San Francisco Art Association
- Known for: Founder of Bosqui Engraving and Printing Company; San Francisco Art Association
- Children: 8

Edward Bosqui (July 23, 1832 – December 15, 1917) was a Canadian artist, printer, and pioneer in San Francisco, California. Involved in the Bohemian Club, he was a patron of the arts.

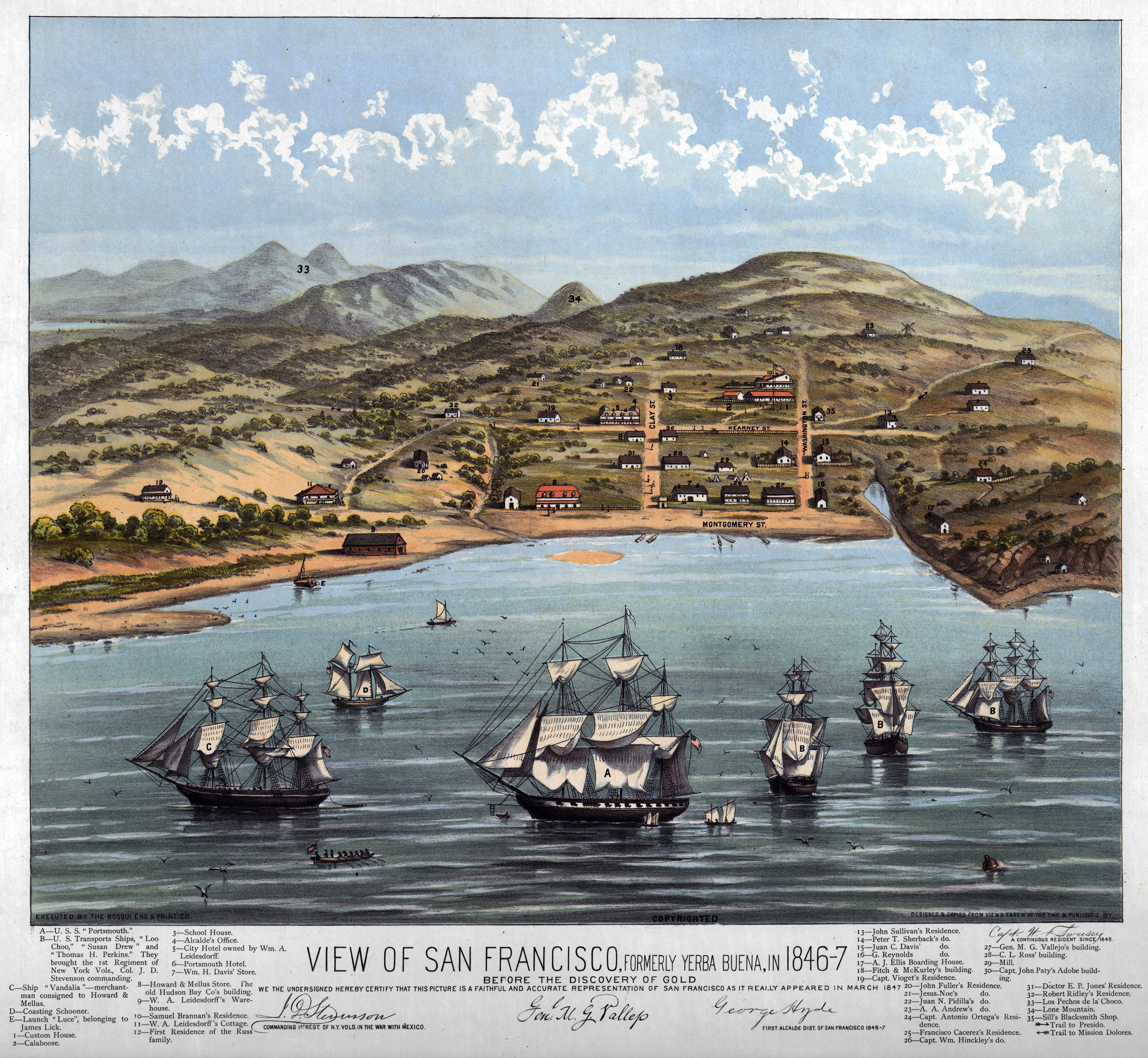
View of Yerba Buena/San Francisco following the 1846 American conquest of California. Print by Edward Bosqui Company, ca. 1884.

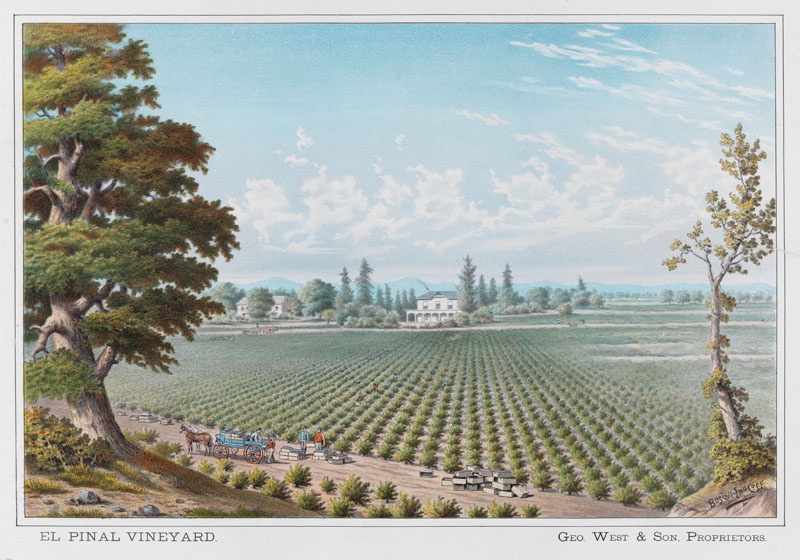
El Pinal Vineyard

Bosqui was born in Montreal and came to California in 1850. He founded the Bosqui Engraving and Printing Company in 1863. A stereoscopic albumen silver print of the building was taken by Eadweard J. Muybridge in 1869. Bosqui helped organize the San Francisco Art Association in 1871.

His home burned down in 1897 and many of his paintings were destroyed in the fire. His printing business also later burned.

He had eight children. His son, Edward L. Bosqui, became California Fish and Game commissioner. Bosqui died in 1917.
