= José de Jesús Noé =

Californio statesman and ranchero

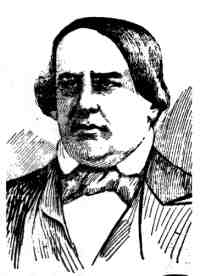

7th Alcalde of San Francisco
- In office 1842–1843
- Preceded by: Francisco Guerrero y Palomares
- Succeeded by: Francisco Sánchez

12th Alcalde of San Francisco
- In office 1846–1846
- Preceded by: José de la Cruz Sánchez
- Succeeded by: Washington Allon Bartlett

Personal details
- Born: 1805
- Died: 17 March 1862 (aged 56–57)
- Resting place: Mission San Francisco de Asís
- Spouse: Guadalupe Garduno

José de Jesús Noé (1805 – 17 March 1862) was a Californio politician, soldier, and ranchero, who served as the 7th and 12th Alcalde of San Francisco, a position similar to mayor. He is the last Hispanic Californian (Californio) to serve as Alcalde of San Francisco, as the office was abolished with adoption of the California Constitution in 1849.

== Life ==
José de Jesús Noé (1805-1862) was born in Puebla, Mexico. He came to California in 1834 with his wife Guadalupe Garduno and their two year old son, as part of the Híjar-Padrés colony. His profession was listed on the colony records as "tailor". Noé was one of the few Híjar colony members who stayed to settle in Northern California, and was among the residents who moved north from the Mission settlement to create the village of Yerba Buena, setting up a home on what is now Portsmouth Square.

Noé applied to then-governor Juan Bautista Alvarado on October 3, 1839, for a land grant, and was granted Rancho Las Camaritas on January 21, 1840. The grant is near present-day 15th and Mission streets, and in the rich alluvial soil of Mission Creek. He set up a small farm and planted grain and produce.

In 1845, Noé was granted the land known as Rancho San Miguel, which covered the neighborhoods now known as Noe Valley, Eureka Valley, Fairmont Heights, Glen Park and Sunnyside.

The U.S. military occupied Yerba Buena in July 1846, at the start of the Mexican–American War. U.S. Navy Commodore Robert F. Stockton, in his capacity as military governor of the occupied territory, appointed Noé as alcalde concurrently with Navy Lt. Washington Allon Bartlett, who was functionally similar to the office of prefect in the Mexican system. One of the last acts of the Noé/Bartlett year was to rename Yerba Buena to its current name, San Francisco.

Noé's wife Guadalupe died in 1848, leaving him with three sons to provide for. That same year, the end of the Mexican-American War brought the cession of California to the United States. The 1848 Treaty of Guadalupe Hidalgo provided that land grants would be honored. As required by the Land Act of 1851, Noé filed a claim with the Public Land Commission for Rancho San Miguel in 1852, and the grant was finally patented to Noé in 1857.

However, Noé had begun selling Rancho San Miguel lands in 1854. He sold a large part of it to John Meirs Horner and his brother William J. Horner. By the time his claim was patented, he had already sold much of it.

Following his death in 1862, Noé was interred at Mission San Francisco de Asís, and passed what remained of the rancho to his children. In 1895, Noé's heirs contended that his 1854 sale to Horner was illegal, and unsuccessfully sued to have half of the rancho land, their mother's share, restored to them.

== See also ==
- Yerba Buena, California
