= Battle of Monterey =

1846 battle of the Mexican-American War

Coordinates: 36°36′23″N 121°53′59″W

- Part of the Conquest of California in the Mexican–American War
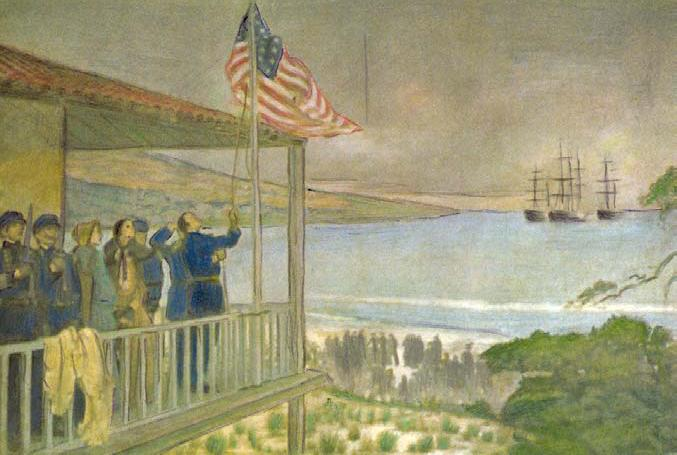
- Officers of Commodore Sloat raise the U.S. flag over Monterey
Date	7 July 1846
Location	Monterey, Department of the Californias, Mexico (present-day Monterey, California)
Result	American victory

Belligerents
United States	Mexico

Commanders and leaders
John D. Sloat; Earl Van Dorn	Mariano Silva

Strength
225 sailors and marines	Unknown

Casualties and losses
None	None

The Battle of Monterey refers to the United States' unopposed capture of present-day Monterey, California from Mexico on 7 July 1846, during the Mexican–American War (1846–1848). Until then, the town was part of Mexico's subdivision named the Department of the Californias.

== Background ==
In February 1845, at the Battle of Providencia, the Californio forces had ousted the Mexican-appointed non-Californio governor, Manuel Micheltorena, and most of his forces from the former territory of Alta California. The central government in Mexico City cancelled an attempt to reassert authority and grudgingly recognized the regime of the succeeding Californio governor, Pio Pico, who remained nominally in charge in Alta California.

The main forces available to the United States in California were the about 400–500 bluejacket sailors and U.S. Marines on board the five ships of the Navy's Pacific Squadron. In November 1845, Commodore John D. Sloat, commander of the Pacific Squadron, then at Mazatlán, Mexico, was joined by the USS Cyane, which carried orders that if Sloat learned "beyond a doubt" that war between the U.S. and Mexico had begun, he was to seize San Francisco Bay and blockade the other California ports.

On 17 May 1846, Commodore Sloat received word of the first open hostilities on the Rio Grande. On 26 May, Sloat received word of the Battle of Palo Alto and the Battle of Resaca de la Palma, upon which he sent a coded message to Secretary of the Navy George Bancroft that he was leaving for California. After delaying his departure, Sloat received news on 7 June that an American squadron had blockaded Vera Cruz. Sloat sailed on the frigate Savannah on 8 June, arriving at Monterey on 1 July.

They joined the sloop Cyane, which had sailed on 19 June and was already there. The Americans suspected without evidence that the British were interested in annexing California, which was exacerbated by their knowledge that the Royal Navy's Pacific Station was stronger than American naval forces in the area. On 5 July, Sloat received a message from Capt. John B. Montgomery of the Portsmouth in San Francisco Bay reporting the events of the Bear Flag Revolt in Sonoma and its open support by Brevet Capt. John C. Frémont.

On 6 July, believing Frémont to be acting either on orders from Washington or information that war had been declared, Sloat therefore began to carry out his orders. In a message to Montgomery, Sloat relayed his decision to seize Monterey and ordered the commander to take possession of Yerba Buena (modern-day San Francisco), adding, "I am very anxious to know if Captain Frémont will cooperate with us."

== Capture ==
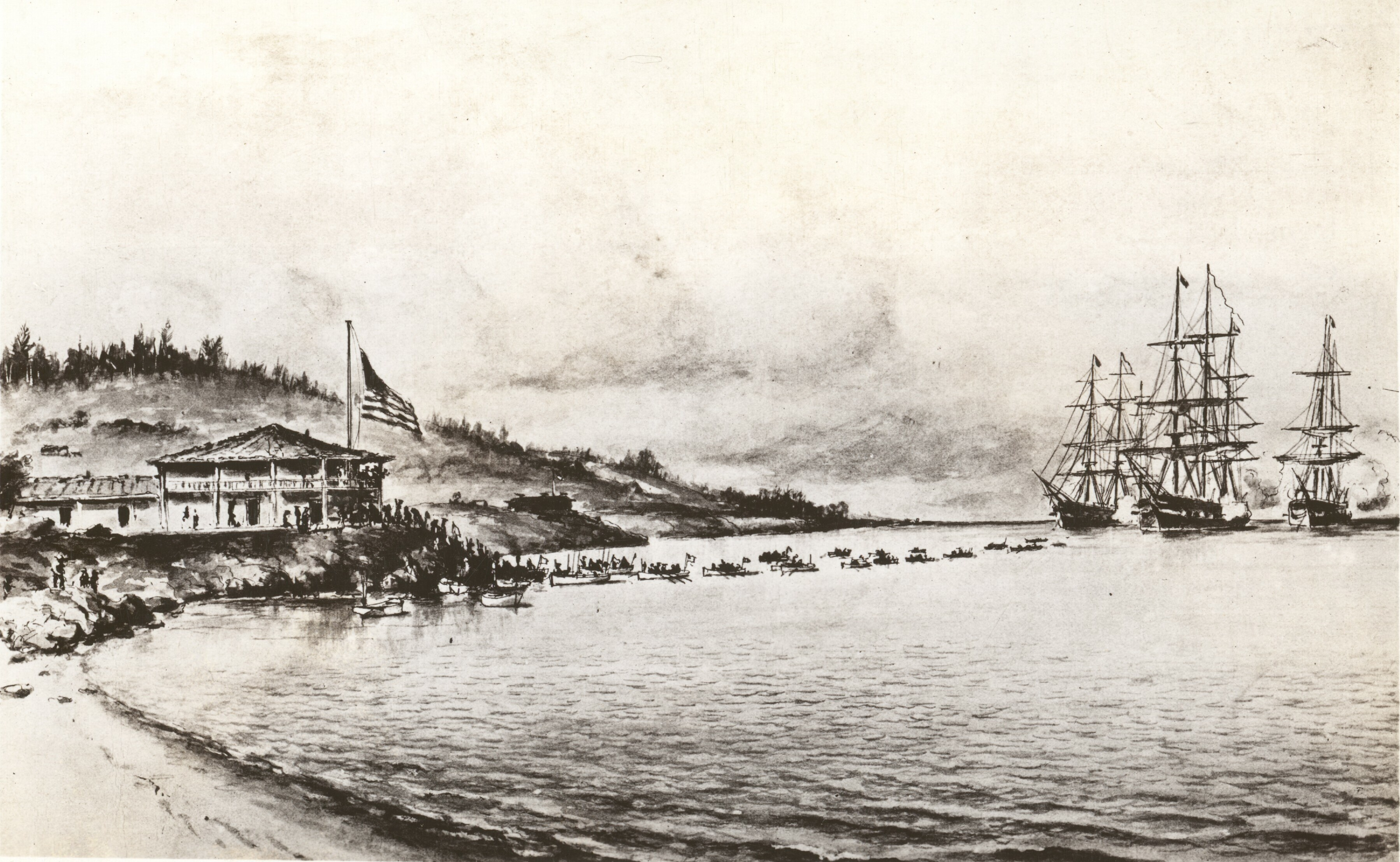
The U.S. Capture of Monterey by Commodore Sloat

Early on 7 July 1846, the frigate USS Savannah and the two sloops, USS Cyane and USS Levant of the United States Navy, commanded by Commodore John D. Sloat, captured Monterey and raised the flag of the United States.

Capt. William Mervine of the Cyane came ashore with a small party from the Savannah at 7:30 a.m., seeking the surrender of the port from the Mexican commandant, Capt. Mariano Silva. Silva replied that he was "not authorized to surrender the place." In fact, Silva was in command of a nonexistent garrison, as it would have had no gunpowder to use in its few cannons. Californio General José Castro had quartered his cavalry forces inland at San Juan Bautista.

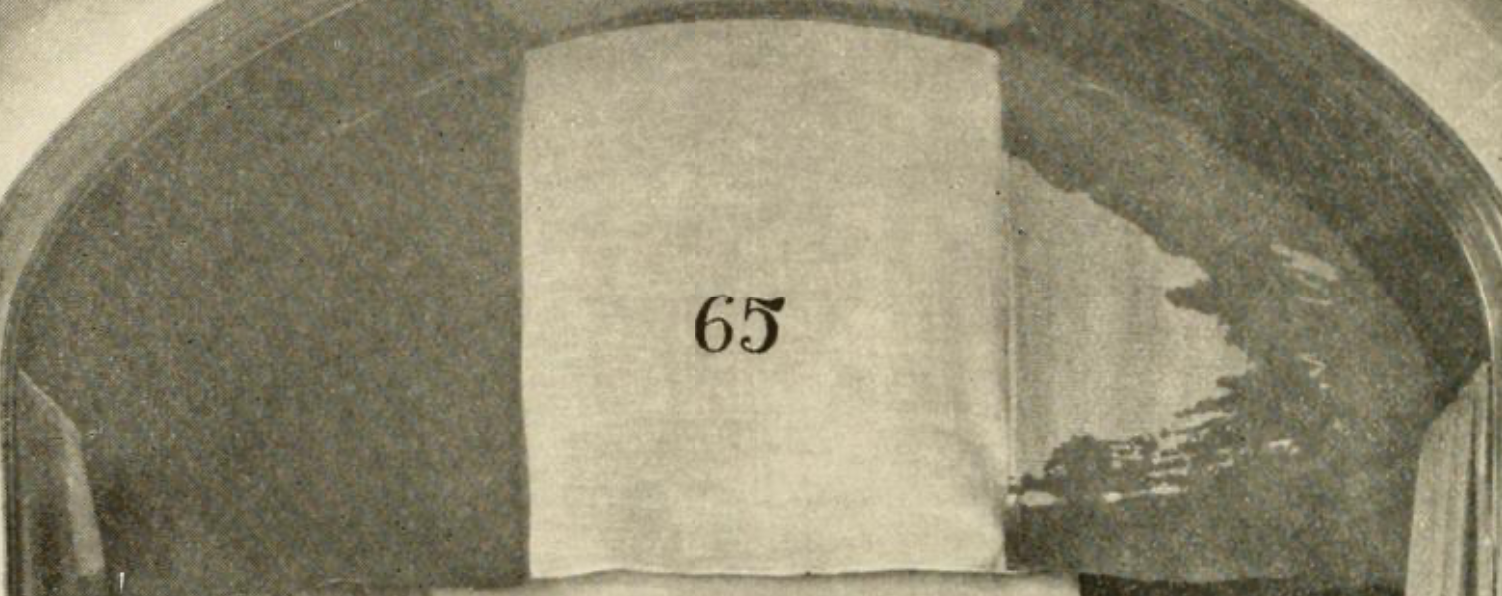
Mexican flag captured by Capt. William Mervine's men

At 10 a.m., 225 sailors and marines from Sloat's three warships landed and formed before the Customs House. Purser Rodman M. Price read Sloat's proclamation and posted it in both English and Spanish, declaring that a state of war existed between the U.S. and Mexico and that "henceforth California would be a portion of the United States."

The only shots fired were a 21-gun salute to the new U.S. flag fired by each of the U.S. Navy ships in the harbor. The British ships observed but took no action. A messenger was sent to General Castro at San Juan Bautista requesting his surrender, which he refused.

== Aftermath ==
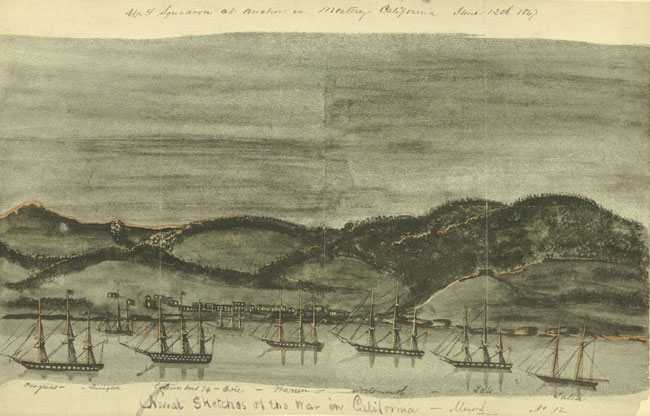
The U.S. fleet at anchor in Monterey a year after its capture in June 1847.

Sloat still recognized Mexican real estate titles and church lands. He also established justices of the peace when the alcaldes resigned their offices.

Captain Montgomery of the Portsmouth received Sloat's message to seize Yerba Buena on 8 July and sent Lt. Joseph W. Revere to Sonoma and Sutter's Fort to notify Fremont of the capture of Monterey. Montgomery and 70 men landed shortly before 8:00 a.m. on 9 July to curious onlookers and read the pronouncement at the Customs House. He then replaced the Bear Flag, which had been raised on 2 July, with the American flag. The American flag was run up with a 21-gun salute. Montgomery then sent Purser James H. Watmough to notify Fremont of the occupation of Yerba Buena and Sloat's request for a meeting.

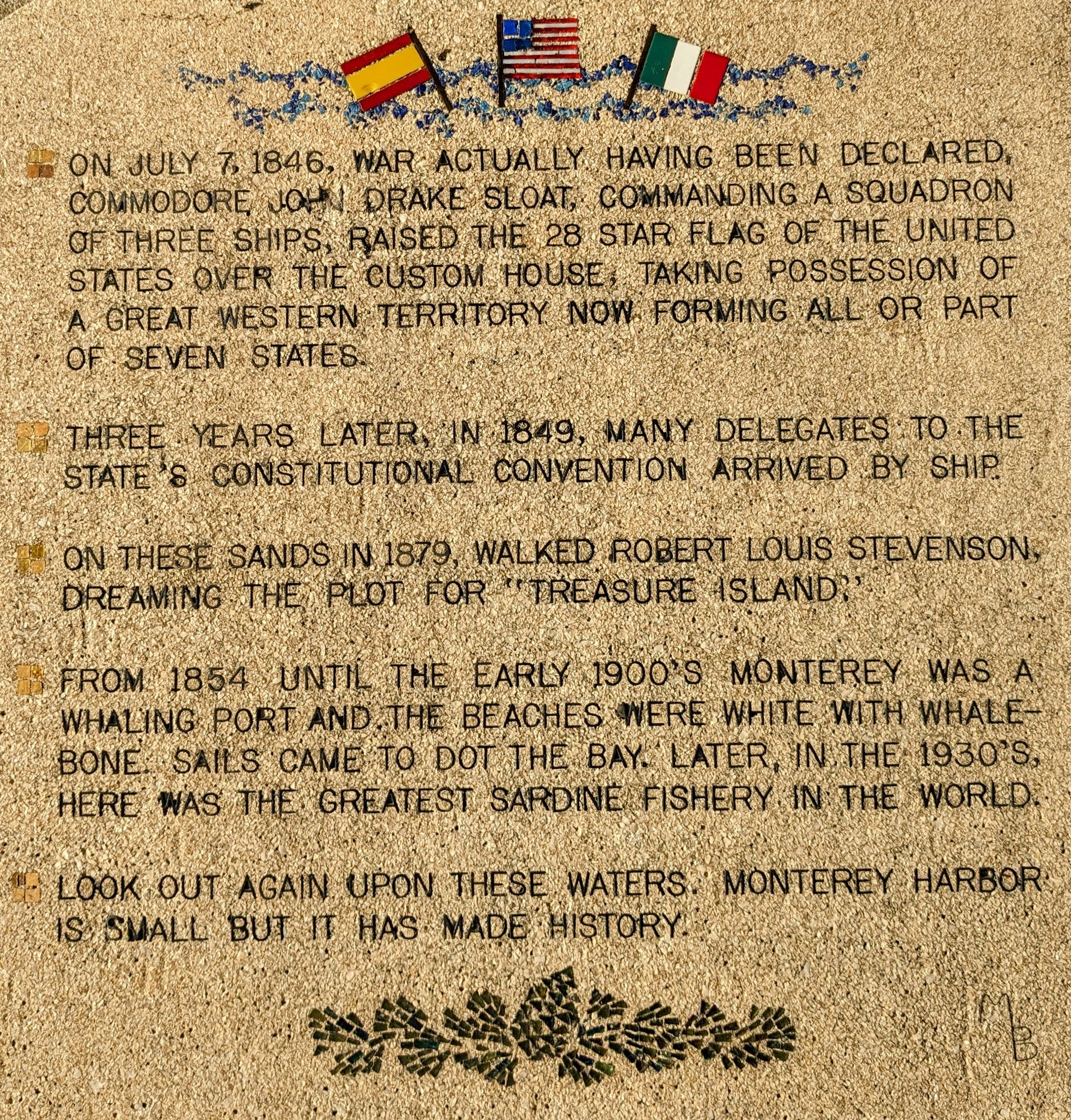
Plaque commemorating the battle, located at Monterey Harbor.

Commodore Robert F. Stockton arrived at Monterey Bay aboard the Congress on 15 July and took over command from the 65-year-old Sloat. The British ship of the line Collingwood arrived in Monterey on 23 July, and Juno arrived at Yerba Buena on 11 July, but neither ship interfered in the American activities.

On 19 July, Frémont's party entered Monterey. Frémont, having been requested, met with Sloat on board the Savannah. When Sloat learned that Frémont had acted on his own authority (thus raising doubt regarding a war declaration), he retired to his cabin. On 23 July, Frémont was appointed major in command of the California Battalion, which he had helped form with his 60-man exploratory force and volunteers from the Bear Flag Republic. The California Battalion, which varied from 160 to 428 men, drew regular army wages and were used to garrison and maintain order in the towns that had surrendered.

The Americans held northern California, but General Castro and Governor Pico planned resistance in the south. However, on 11 August, upon learning of the advance of the American army on Pueblo de Los Angeles, with about 1,500 residents, the California army of about 100 men, which lacked money and popular support, broke up. Its leaders, Castro and Pico, departed that day for the Mexican department of Sonora. The Mexican government in California had ceased to exist.

== See also ==
- List of battles of the Mexican–American War
- Mexican-American War
