= Yerba Buena, California =

Settlement which became San Francisco in 1847

Coordinates: 37°47′35″N 122°23′47″W

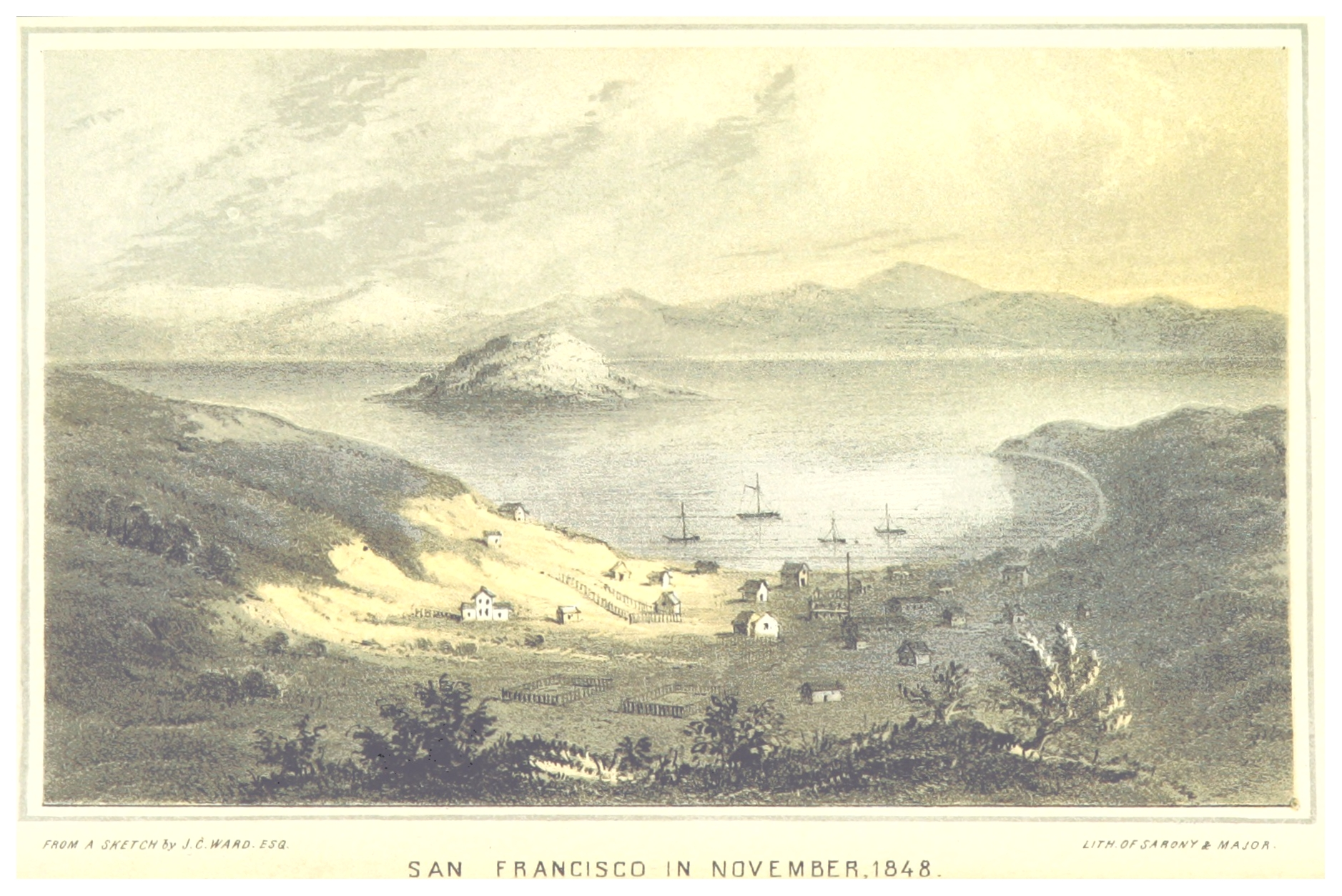
San Francisco in 1848, not long after being renamed from Yerba Buena, looking to the northeast over Yerba Buena Cove toward Yerba Buena Island. Lithograph by Sarony & Major from sketch by J. C. Ward.

Yerba Buena was an anchorage spot and later a settlement that grew into the city of San Francisco, California. The settlement, built in an area known earlier as El Paraje de Yerba Buena and named for a herb that grew abundantly there, was founded in 1834 and was located near the northeastern end of the San Francisco Peninsula, on the shores of Yerba Buena Cove. Yerba Buena was the first Spanish colonial or Mexican civilian settlement in San Francisco, which had previously only had indigenous, missionary, and military settlements, and was originally intended as a trading post for ships visiting San Francisco Bay. The settlement was arranged in the Spanish style around a plaza that remains as the present day Portsmouth Square. The area that was the Yerba Buena settlement is now in the Financial District and Chinatown neighborhoods of San Francisco.

== History ==
=== Background ===
Spanish colonial and Mexican settlements in Alta California were of five types. The misiónes (missions) were religious settlements run by Franciscan priests to evangelize the indigenous peoples of California. Presidios were military bases, established at the same time as the missions, responsible for protecting them, controlling the native population, and defending Spanish and later Mexican territory against foreign incursions.

Three secular civilian pueblos were also created during the period when the missions were being established. These were El Pueblo de San José de Guadalupe (1777 - now the City of San Jose); the Pueblo de Los Ángeles (1781 - now the City of Los Angeles); and the Villa de Branciforte (1797 - now part of the City of Santa Cruz. The first pueblo inhabitants were brought in groups from Mexico, recruited specifically for colonization.

Beginning in 1784 under Spanish Empire rule, land concessions were made to private citizens in areas outside of mission or presidio control. Following Mexican independence in 1820 and secularization of the missions by the Mexican Secularization Act of 1833, actual land grants (conferring ownership) were made, from land formerly controlled by the missions (mainly large areas of grazing land). Those grants continued to be made until 1846.

Also following secularization of the missions, secular communities that had grown up (mostly around the mission compounds) remained, becoming a fifth type of settlement that often adopted the former mission name. Yerba Buena was an exception because its waterfront location did not closely surround either the mission or the presidio, although later San Francisco included both the former mission and presidio areas, and adopted their name.

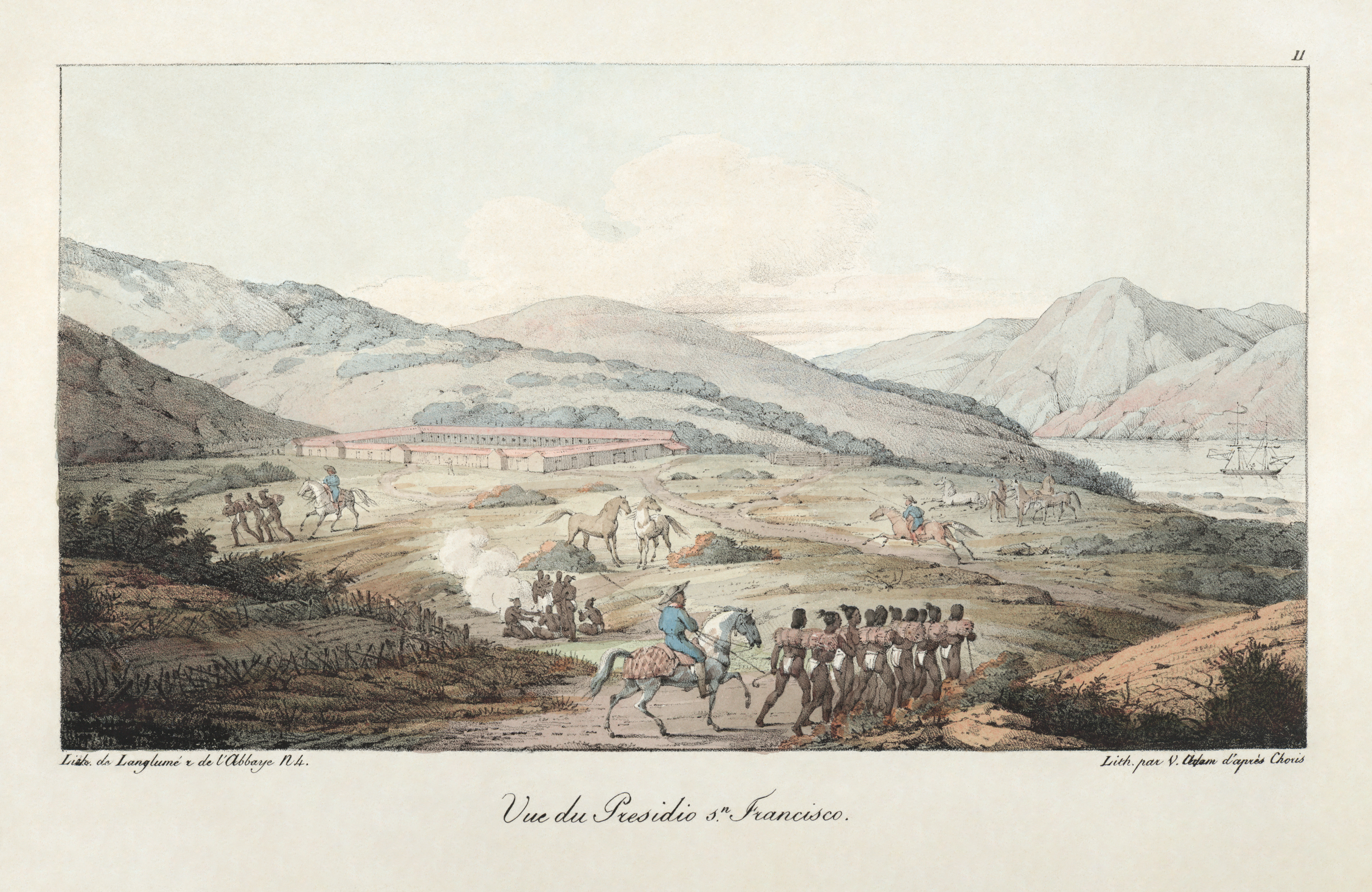
Presidio of San Francisco in Alta California, in 1817. Lithograph by Victor Adam from drawing by Louis Choris.

The two earliest Spanish colonial settlements in San Francisco were both made in 1776 following the de Anza Expedition. The Presidio of San Francisco was founded on September 18th of that year near the southern side of the Golden Gate. Mission San Francisco de Asís was founded on October 9 a little further inland near the Laguna de los Dolores, for the purpose of concentrating the Ohlone and Miwok peoples of the northern San Francisco Bay area and converting them to Christianity. There were no independent rancho, pueblo, or other civilian settlements in today's San Francisco until after the Mexican Secularization Act of 1833.

=== Paraje and anchorage ===
The uninhabited northeastern area of San Francisco was called El Paraje de Yerba Buena (The Place of the Good Herb), derived from the Spanish geographical term paraje, meaning "place", "camp", or "stopping point" and yerba buena, the Spanish name for plants in the mint family, used in Alta California for Clinopodium douglasii, which grew abundantly in this area.

There were several anchorage spots for ships visiting San Francisco. The earliest one was the Presidio anchorage, located just inside the Golden Gate, within a mile to the east of Punta del Cantil Blanco (what was later called Fort Point). The Yerba Buena anchorage eventually came to be more favored, as it was more sheltered and less precarious than the Presidio anchorage, even though it was farther from the Presidio headquarters. The Yerba Buena anchorage actually referred to two locations, with the earlier spot being close to North Point, but was later located a little further to the south, at Yerba Buena Cove. The name was eventually extended to the island facing Yerba Buena Cove, the Isla de Yerba Buena (Yerba Buena Island), originally known as Isla de Alcatraces.

The earliest report of the use of Yerba Buena as a place name comes from the log of George Vancouver, who in 1792 sailed his ship HMS Discovery into San Francisco Bay and anchored "about a league below the Presidio in a place they called Yerba Buena". Following the Vancouver Expedition, the Presidio anchorage continued to be the more commonly used landing point. However, during the particularly harsh winter of 1824, ships began to favor the anchorage at Yerba Buena and so Yerba Buena Cove became the main disembarkation point for ships visiting San Francisco.

In 1797, the Spanish presidio constructed the Bateria de Yerba Buena at Punta Medanos (Black Point) as an artillery battery to provide additional protection to the Yerba Buena anchorage. The site was only briefly occupied and was abandoned by 1806.

=== Mexican settlement ===
With the enactment of the Mexican Secularization Act of 1833, the missions were made to divest themselves of their extensive landholdings and emancipate the indigenous people under their control. As part of the process of secularization, Governor José Figueroa opened up San Francisco to civilian settlement. In 1834, the settlement of Yerba Buena was founded on the shores of Yerba Buena Cove.

In 1835, William A. Richardson, a naturalized Mexican citizen of English birth, erected a homestead near the boat anchorage of Yerba Buena Cove. Together with Alcalde Francisco de Haro, he laid out a street plan for the expanded settlement, which retained the name Yerba Buena.

In early 1841 James Douglas of the Hudson's Bay Company (HBC), operating on the Pacific coast from Fort Vancouver, went to Yerba Buena to establish an HBC trading post. A large building on the water's edge was purchased. The HBC post had several purposes. It operated as a wholesale store, selling goods exported from Fort Vancouver such as salmon, lumber, and British manufactures in exchange for hides and tallow. The post improved diplomatic relations between the British HBC and the Mexican government of California, making the HBC's fur trapping expeditions into California's Central Valley politically acceptable. Despite the mercantile potential of the HBC store in Yerba Buena, in 1842 it was ordered to be closed by George Simpson as part of Simpson's general reorganization of the HBC's Columbia District. The HBC store in Yerba Buena was sold in 1846, two years before the California Gold Rush transformed Yerba Buena into the major city on the North American west coast.

=== American conquest and name change ===
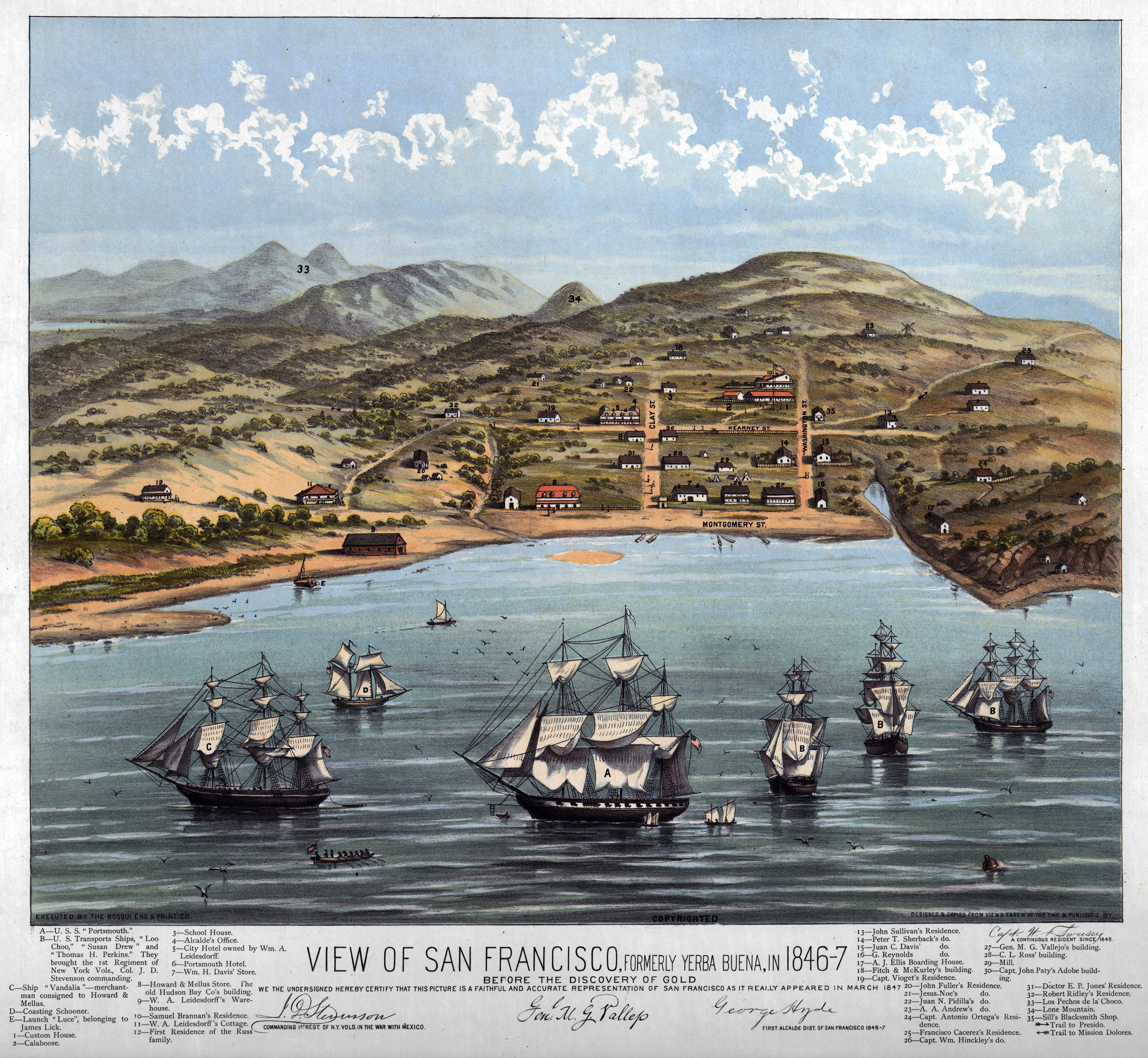
View of the Yerba Buena at the time of the American conquest of California, based on the testimony of Captain William F. Sawsey. Illustration ca. 1884 by the Edward Bosqui Co.

On July 7, 1846, in the early part of the Mexican–American War, US Navy Commodore John D. Sloat claimed Alta California for the United States after capturing Monterey, the province's capital. US Navy Captain John Berrien Montgomery and US Marine Second Lieutenant Henry Bulls Watson of the USS Portsmouth arrived to claim Yerba Buena two days later by raising the American flag over the town plaza, which is now Portsmouth Square in honor of the ship. Henry Bulls Watson was placed in command of the garrison there. On July 31, 1846, Yerba Buena doubled in population when about 240 Mormon migrants from the East coast arrived on the ship Brooklyn, led by Sam Brannan. In August 1846, Lt. Washington Allon Bartlett was named alcalde of Yerba Buena. On January 30, 1847, Lt. Bartlett's proclamation changing the name Yerba Buena to San Francisco took effect. The city and the rest of Alta California officially became a United States military territory in 1848 by the terms of the Treaty of Guadalupe Hidalgo, which ended the Mexican–American War. California was admitted for statehood to the United States on September 9, 1850. The State soon chartered San Francisco as both a City and a County.

== Modern use of name ==
Yerba Buena is used for a number of place names in modern San Francisco. Yerba Buena Island has retained its name from the Spanish era up to modern times, although from 1895 to 1931, it was officially designated Goat Island. Yerba Buena Gardens, which includes Yerba Buena Center for the Arts, is a complex of parks, museums, theaters, and malls in the South of Market (SoMa) district of San Francisco that was founded in 1993. The Yerba Buena Community Benefits District has designated an area centered on Yerba Buena Gardens and bounded by Market, Howard, Second, and Fifth Streets as the Yerba Buena District, a subdistrict of the SoMa neighborhood. A Yerba Buena Avenue runs through the St. Francis Wood and Westwood Highlands neighborhoods on the southwestern side of San Francisco.

== See also ==
- History of San Francisco
- List of pre-statehood mayors of Yerba Buena–San Francisco
- American conquest of California
