= List of pre-statehood mayors of San Francisco =

This is a list of pre-statehood alcaldes and mayors of San Francisco, from 1779 to 1850, during the Spanish, Mexican, and early American periods, prior to California's admission to statehood.

== Spanish era ==
California's first governor Felipe de Neve ordered all of the Missions to elect local Alcaldes (a combination of Mayor and Magistrate) around 1779.

Alcaldes of Mission San Francisco de Asís
| | Term |
|---|---|
| Valeriano and Jorge were elected. | 1797 |
| Two Ohlone men from the village Pruristac with the baptismal names Hilarion and George | 1807 |

== Mexican era ==
Alcaldes of San Francisco
| Portrait | Alcalde | Term | Notes |
|---|---|---|---|
| | Francisco de Haro | 1834 | 1835 |
| | José Joaquín Estudillo | 1835 | 1836 |
| | Francisco Guerrero y Palomares | 1836 | 1837 |
| | Ygnacio Martínez | 1837 | 1838 |
| | Francisco de Haro | 1838 | 1839 |
| | Francisco Guerrero y Palomares | 1839 | 1842 |
| | José de Jesús Noé | 1842 | 1843 |
| | Francisco Sánchez | 1843 | 1844 |
| | William Sturgis Hinckley | 1844 | 1845 |
| | Juan Nepomuceno Padilla | 1845 | 1845 |
| | José de la Cruz Sánchez | 1845 | 1846 |
| | José de Jesús Noé | 1846 | 1846 |

== American era ==
Alcaldes of San Francisco
| Portrait | Alcalde | Term | Notes |
|---|---|---|---|
| | Washington Allon Bartlett | August 22, 1846 | February 22, 1847 |
| | Edwin Bryant | February 22, 1847 | June 1847 |
| | George Hyde | June 1847 | April 1848 |
| | John Townsend | April 1848 | September 1848 |
| | Thaddeus M. Leavenworth | October 1848 | August 1849 |
| | John White Geary | August 1849 | March 1, 1850 |

== See also ==
- List of pre-statehood mayors of Los Angeles
- List of pre-statehood mayors of San Jose
- List of pre-statehood mayors of San Diego
