= John B. Montgomery =

United States Navy admiral

John Berrien Montgomery
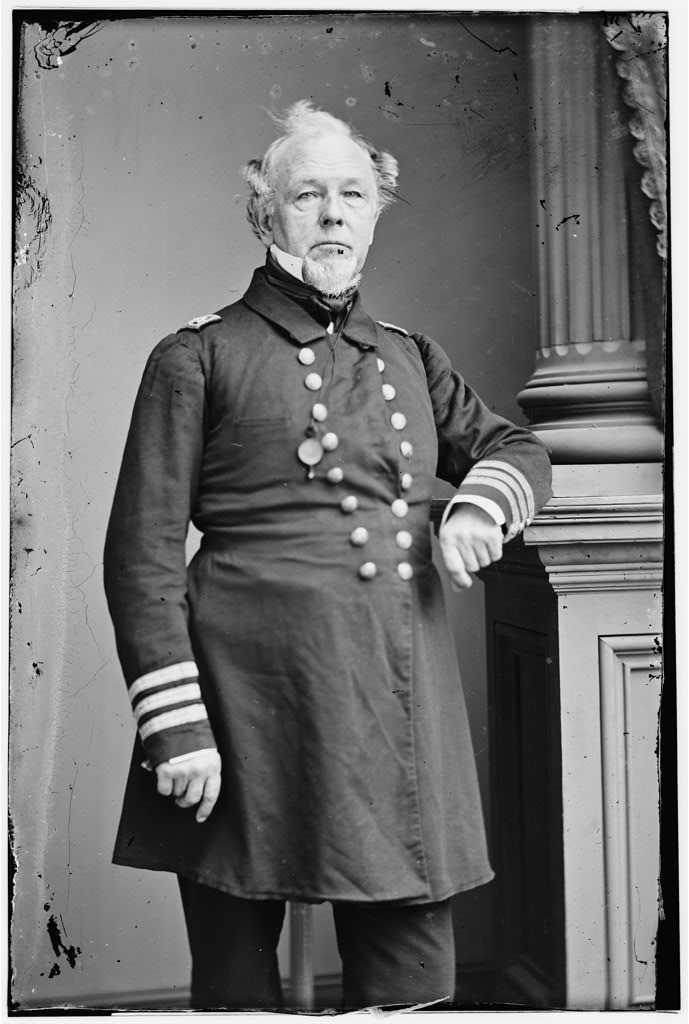
- Born: 1794; Allentown, New Jersey, U.S.
- Died: March 25, 1873 (aged 78–79); Carlisle, Pennsylvania, U.S.
- Burial place: Oak Hill Cemetery; Washington, D.C., U.S.
- Military career
- Branch: United States Navy
- Service years: 1812–1869
- Rank: Rear admiral
- Commands: USS Portsmouth; USS Roanoke; Pacific Squadron
- Conflicts: War of 1812; Second Barbary War; Mexican–American War; American Civil War

John Berrien Montgomery (1794 – March 25, 1873) was an officer in the United States Navy who rose up through the ranks, serving in the War of 1812, Mexican–American War and the American Civil War, performing in various capacities including the commanding of several different vessels.

== Biography ==
Montgomery was born in Allentown, New Jersey. He entered the Navy as a midshipman during the War of 1812, serving in the attack on Kingston, Upper Canada, in November 1812, and in the capture of York in April of the following year; and for gallantly on board the Niagara in Perry's victory on Lake Erie, September 10, 1813. For his distinguished service he received a vote of thanks and a sword from Congress. In 1815 he served in Decatur's squadron in the Second Barbary War against Algiers, was made a lieutenant in 1818, and commander in 1839.

His commands included the sloop-of-war Portsmouth in 1844, and the steam frigate Roanoke in 1857. He served as Commandant of the Boston Navy Yard from June 1862 to December 1863, and then of the Washington Navy Yard in 1865.

During the Mexican–American War, in early June 1846, Montgomery and the ship he commanded, the USS Portsmouth, arrived in San Francisco Bay, then part of the Mexican department of The Californias (Las Californias). As a result, Montgomery was involved, albeit as a witness only and from a distance, in the events of the Bear Flag Revolt in which foreign residents, mostly American, revolted against the Mexican authorities in Sonoma. As a naval representative of the U.S. Government, he was deferred to by representatives of the Revolt, by representatives of the Alta California government and by other representatives of the U.S. On June 16, 1846, Montgomery sent a mission to Sonoma to investigate the conditions there, following the Revolt.

On July 9, 1846, Montgomery and his detachment from the Portsmouth raised the American flag over the plaza in the town of Yerba Buena (today's San Francisco). The name of the plaza was later changed to Portsmouth Square, commemorating Montgomery's ship. The street running along the shore of Yerba Buena Cove was renamed Montgomery Street in his honor in 1847. At his direction, Lt. Joseph W. Revere also lowered the Bear Flag flying at Sonoma, California, north of San Francisco Bay and raised the U.S. Flag. The lowered Bear Flag ended up in Montgomery's possession and, in 1848, he delivered it to Naval authorities in Boston. Ultimately, in 1855, the flag was returned to California, where it was destroyed in the fires caused by the 1906 earthquake.

In other action of the Mexican–American War, Montgomery blockaded Mazatlan for some months, and, with the assistance of Captain Lavalette in the Congress, captured Guaymas. He was made a captain in 1853. In 1859, Montgomery commanded the Pacific Squadron until relieved on January 2, 1862.

Montgomery died on March 25, 1873, in Carlisle, Pennsylvania. His remains were interred at Oak Hill Cemetery, Washington, D.C.

== Namesakes ==
- Montgomery Street, a notable street in downtown San Francisco.
- USS Montgomery, a naval destroyer launched in 1918 and scrapped in 1946.

== Sources ==
- Tucker, Spencer C., ed. (2013). The Encyclopedia of the Mexican-American War: A Political, Social, and Military History. Vol. 1. Santa Barbara, California: ABC-CLIO. ISBN 978-1-85109-853-8.
