= Mission Creek (disambiguation) =

Mission Creek is a river in San Francisco.

Mission Creek may also refer to:

== Populated places ==
- Mission Creek, Minnesota
- Mission Creek Township, Pine County, Minnesota

== Streams ==
=== Canada ===
- Mission Creek (British Columbia)

=== United States ===
==== California ====
- Mission Creek (Laguna Creek), a tributary stream in Alameda County, California
- Mission Creek (San Gabriel River), a tributary stream in Los Angeles County, California
- Mission Creek (San Antonio River), a tributary stream in Monterey County, California
- Mission Creek (Whitewater River), a tributary stream in Riverside County, California.
- Mission Creek, San Francisco
- Mission Creek (Santa Barbara), a stream in Santa Barbara County, California
- Mission Creek (Hulbert Creek, Russian River), a tributary stream in Sonoma County, California

==== Other States ====
- Mission Creek (Kansas)
- Mission Creek (Saint Louis River), a stream in Minnesota
- Mission Creek (Snake River), a stream in Minnesota
- Mission Creek (Marion County, Oregon), a river in Oregon
- Mission Creek (Stanley County, South Dakota), a stream in South Dakota
- Mission Creek (Texas), a stream in Victoria County

== See also ==
- Mission Creek Music and Arts Festival
