= Rancho Potrero de San Francisco =

Mexican land grant in California

Coordinates: 37°45′25.78″N 122°23′59.5″W

Rancho Potrero de San Francisco or Rancho Potrero Nuevo was approximately 1,000-acre (4.0 km^{2}) Mexican land grant in the present day Potrero Hill neighborhood of San Francisco, California.

The rancho included the land from the bay at Point San Quentin, (later called Potrero Point) between Mission Creek to the north and Islais Creek and its tributary Precita Creek to the south, including Potrero Hill and land sloping down to the west of it to its boundary with Rancho Rincon de las Salinas y Potrero Viejo between Mission and Precita Creeks.

== History ==
The De Haro's claimed it was given in 1841 by Governor Juan Alvarado to Francisco and Ramón de Haro, sons of Francisco de Haro, the first alcalde of Yerba Buena. Francisco and Ramon de Haro, along with their uncle Jose de los Reyes Berreyesa, were shot dead by Kit Carson in San Rafael at the order of U.S. Army Major John C. Fremont during the Mexican–American War in 1846. Ownership of the rancho went to their father who died in November 1849.

As early as mid 1849, John Townsend and Cornelius de Boom had lots surveyed on the de Haro's Potrero Nuevo ranch, on the Potrero Nuevo peninsula, on the south shore of Mission Bay. Despite the locations sloping ground, good water, and secure anchorage their attempt at settlement was unsuccessful due to the remoteness of the site from the city. Uncertainties involving the Haro family's claims to the land continued and squatters took up residence.

The claim of the remaining de Haro family, was at first confirmed by the land commission but was subsequently rejected by the U.S. District Court on proof that the grants were fraudulent. There was a genuine license to occupy, the regular grant had been withheld because the mission ejidos might include this land, followed by occupation by the family. On that basis the Haro lawyers attempted to get their claim confirmed by the Supreme Court in 1866. It was not until 1867 that the claim of the de Haro's to Potrero Nuevo was finally denied, with the ruling that they held only a license to run cattle on the land but had no actual title to it.

After this decision lessees under the Haro title refused to pay rent, claiming ownership as squatters or as settlers on government land, or city lands by the Van Ness Ordinance and acts of Congress. Owners under the Haro title claimed the land on the same grounds as their opponents, having been themselves the occupants, squatters, or settlers through their lessees. There followed a series of suits where those with the Haro title were defeated in 1878.

== See also ==
- Ranchos of San Francisco
- List of ranchos of California
