= Point San Quentin =

Former land feature in San Francisco, CA

Coordinates: 37°45′35.34″N 122°23′0.87″W

Point San Quentin, later known as Potrero Point, was the land projecting into San Francisco Bay that marked the southern extremity of Mission Bay (now filled in), in San Francisco, California.

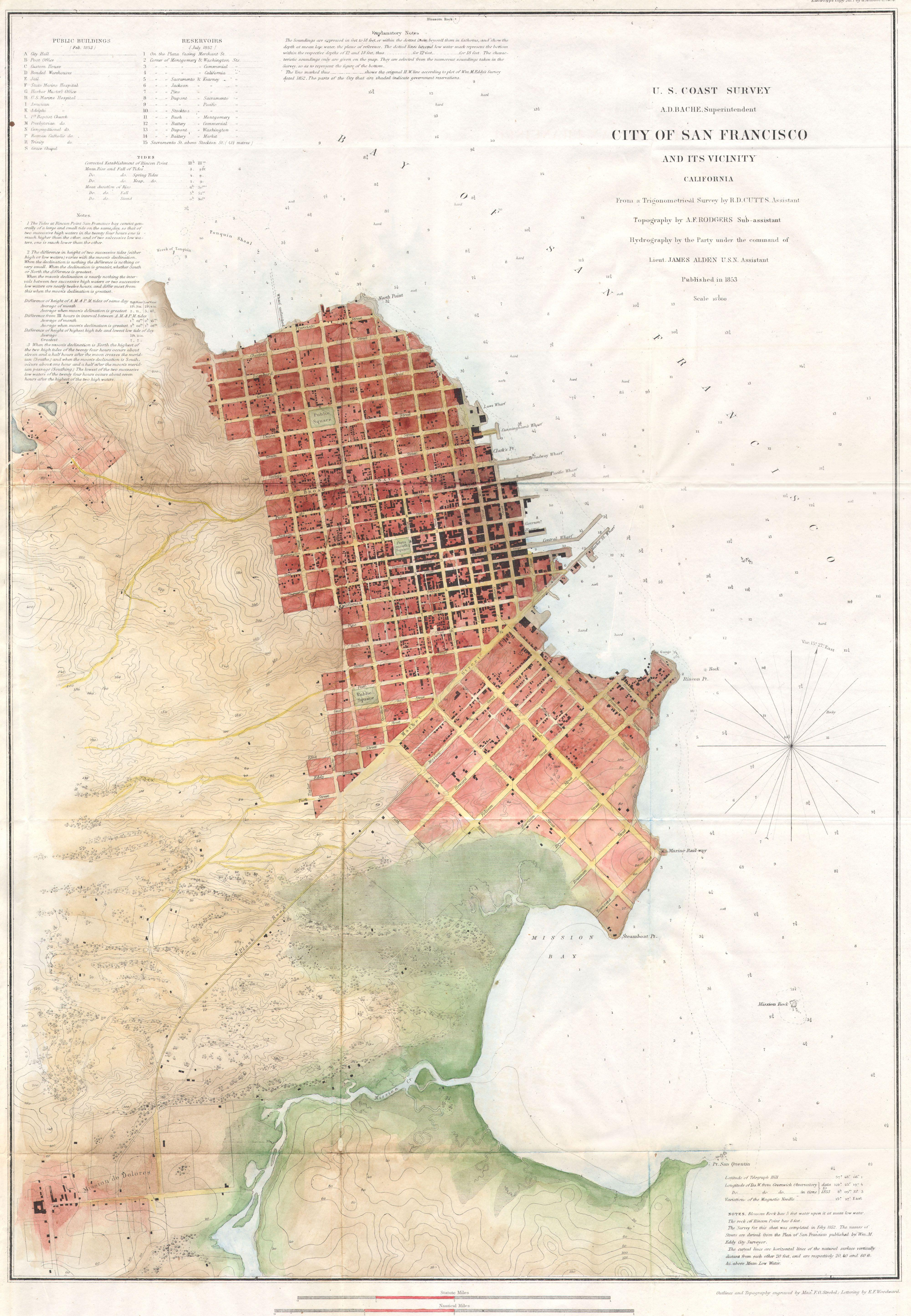
San Francisco shoreline in 1853, with Point San Quentin visible in the lower right corner

== History ==
Originally named by Spanish settlers in the 18th century, it retained the name Point San Quentin on U.S. Coastal survey maps as late as 1869. By 1882, the land projecting from the southern tip of Mission Bay is shown on maps as Potrero Point, and commonly called The Potrero, for the former Rancho Potrero de San Francisco that had included the point within its boundaries.

In the early 1850s the site of the Tubbs and Company ropewalk, in the mid-1860s it became the major shipbuilding site for San Francisco. Subsequently, the shoreline of the point along Mission Bay and San Francisco Bay was filled in. By 1880, Potrero Point had become the San Francisco center for heavy industry companies like the Atlas Iron Works, Bethlehem Shipyard, California Sugar Refinery, Pacific Rolling Mill, and the Union Iron Works. These industries continued there through World War I.

The Dogpatch neighborhood is located on Potrero Point.
