= Mission Creek Music and Arts Festival =

Week-long volunteer-driven music festival in California

- Location: San Francisco, California, United States
- Established: 1996
- Founded by: Jeff Ray
- Disestablished: 2017
- Successor: Mission Creek Oakland Music and Arts Festival (MCOMAF)

Mission Creek Music and Arts Festival (MCMAF), also known as Mission Creek, and Mission Creek Oakland Music and Arts Festival, was a week-long volunteer-driven music festival active from 1996 to 2017, and located in San Francisco and later Oakland, California. It featured local, experimental, and contemporary artists who have made an impact on the local community scene. The festival prided itself on showcasing fledgling musicians and artists who go on to headline their own shows. The festival was a grassroots project that took a hard stance against corporate sponsorship.

== History ==
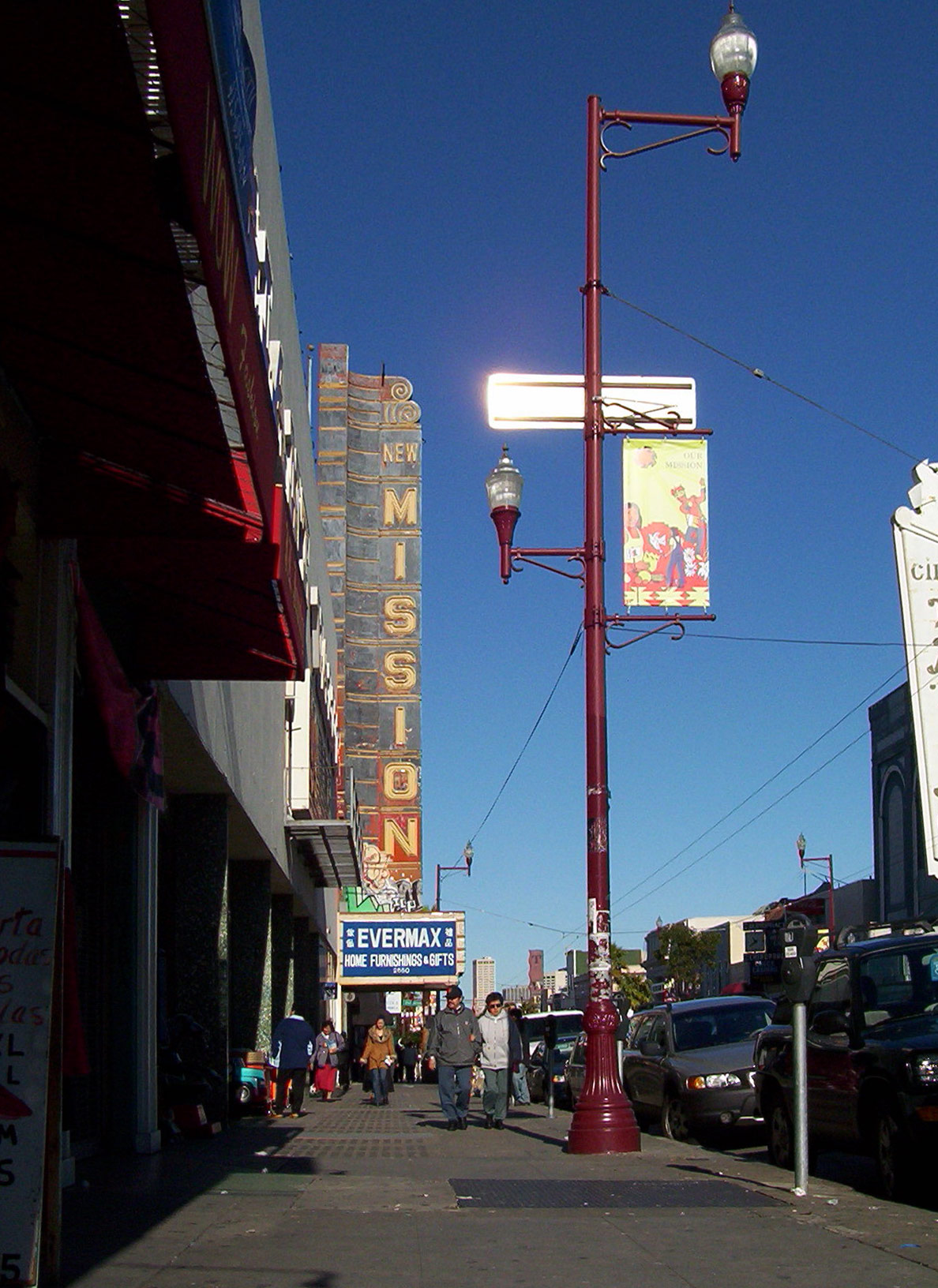
Image of Mission Street in the Mission District District

The project began in 1996, when San Francisco musician Jeff Ray decided to showcase eight Bay Area independent musicians in a one-day event at El Rio bar in the Mission District, and called it a festival.

The festival took a hard stance against corporate sponsorship. Andre Perry, one of the festival's producers sums up their position saying, "Basically, we're not interested in companies without any responsibility or connection to the local community." The festival takes its name from the Mission Creek watershed that once flourished in the neighborhood.

The first person in San Francisco to book harpist Joanna Newsom, was MCMAF producers Neil Martinson and Jon Fellman.

Former Mission Creek acts include Devendra Banhart, Deerhoof, Erase Errata, The Oh Sees, Kelley Stoltz, Rogue Wave, and Vetiver, all of whom developed national followings. The producers also have an eye for talented visual artists. Among the local artists who have designed posters for the festival are Jo Jackson, and Andrew Schultz, key artists in the Mission School art movement, and centered on Adobe Books.

In 2009 and 2010, the festival has hosted free one-day outdoor concerts attended by 1,200 people in John McLaren Park, the second largest park in San Francisco. Festival founder, Jeffrey Ray, and producer Andre Perry, who, along with Tanner Illingworth founded Mission Creek Iowa City in 2005 where it just celebrated its 20th year in April 2025. https://missioncreekfestival.com/

=== Oakland move and closure ===
The festival later expanded, then moved to Oakland and was renamed as the Mission Creek Oakland Music and Arts Festival (MCOMAF). Jennifer "Kiyomi" Tanouye, who had help run the festival for many years starting in 2006, had died in the 2016 Ghost Ship warehouse fire. Tanouye was largely responsible for the festivals expansion into Oakland. The Mission Creek Oakland Music and Arts Festival shuttered in 2017.

== See also ==
- Festivals in the San Francisco Bay Area
- Mission Bay (San Francisco) — at river mouth of historic Mission Creek.
