= Potrero Point =

District in southeast San Francisco, California

- Neighborhood
- Location within Central San Francisco
- Coordinates: 37°45′35.34″N 122°23′0.87″W
- Country: United States
- State: California
- City-county: San Francisco
- Named for: potrero nuevo (new pasture)

Area
  - Total: 2.5 sq mi (6.5 km^{2})
- Time zone: UTC−8 (Pacific)
  - Summer (DST): UTC−7 (PDT)
- ZIP Codes: 94107, 94158, 94124
- Area codes: 415/628

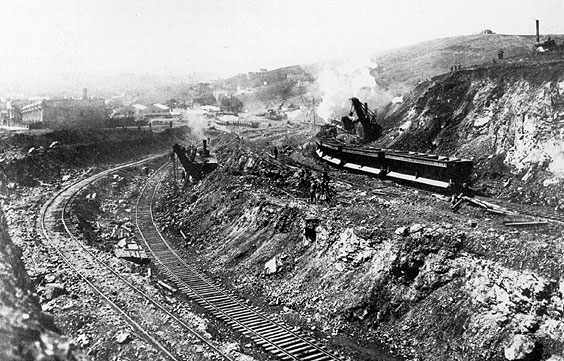
Carving the east side of Potrero Hill for a railroad line in 1870

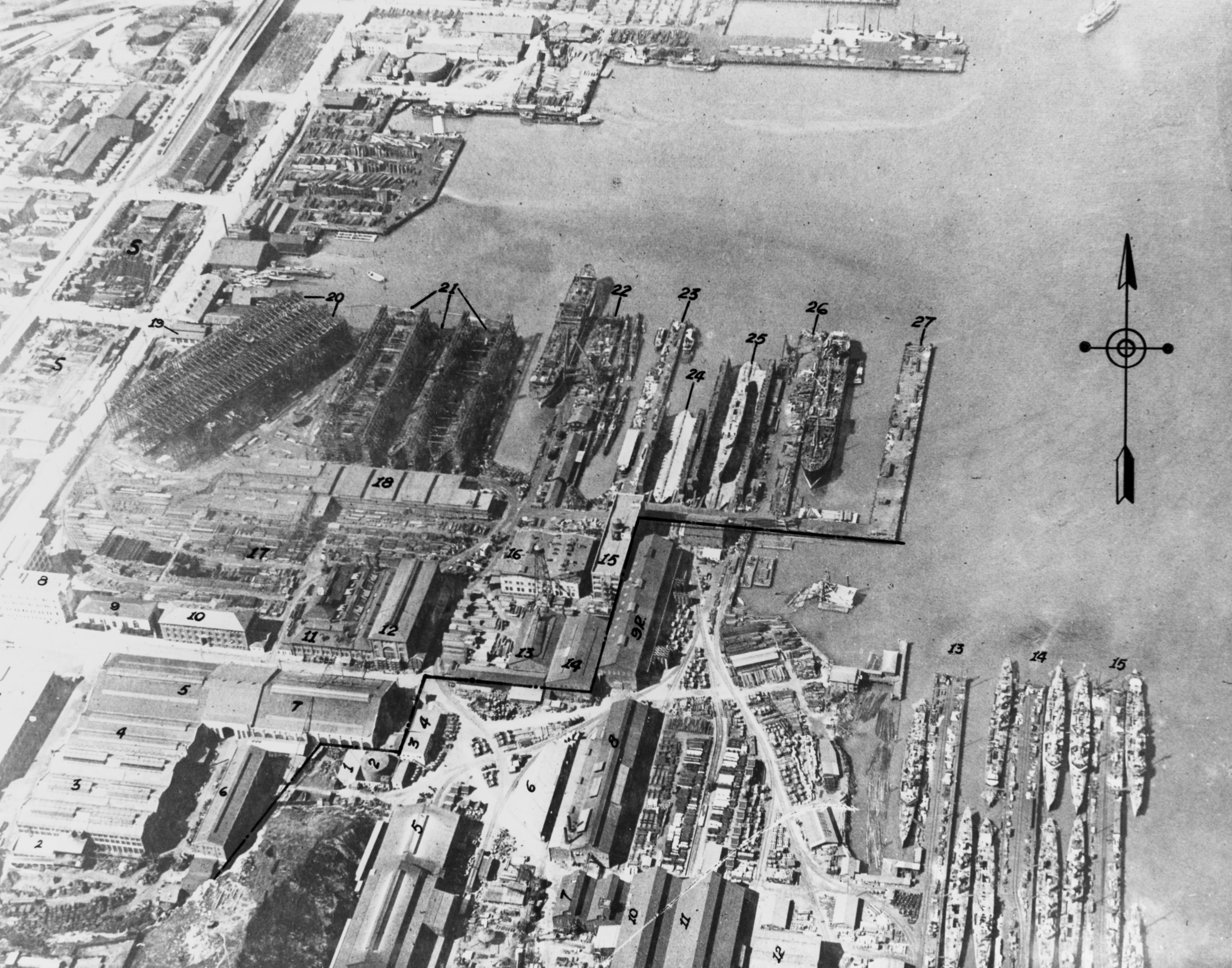
Pier area c. 1918, looking north to Union Iron Works at Potrero Point

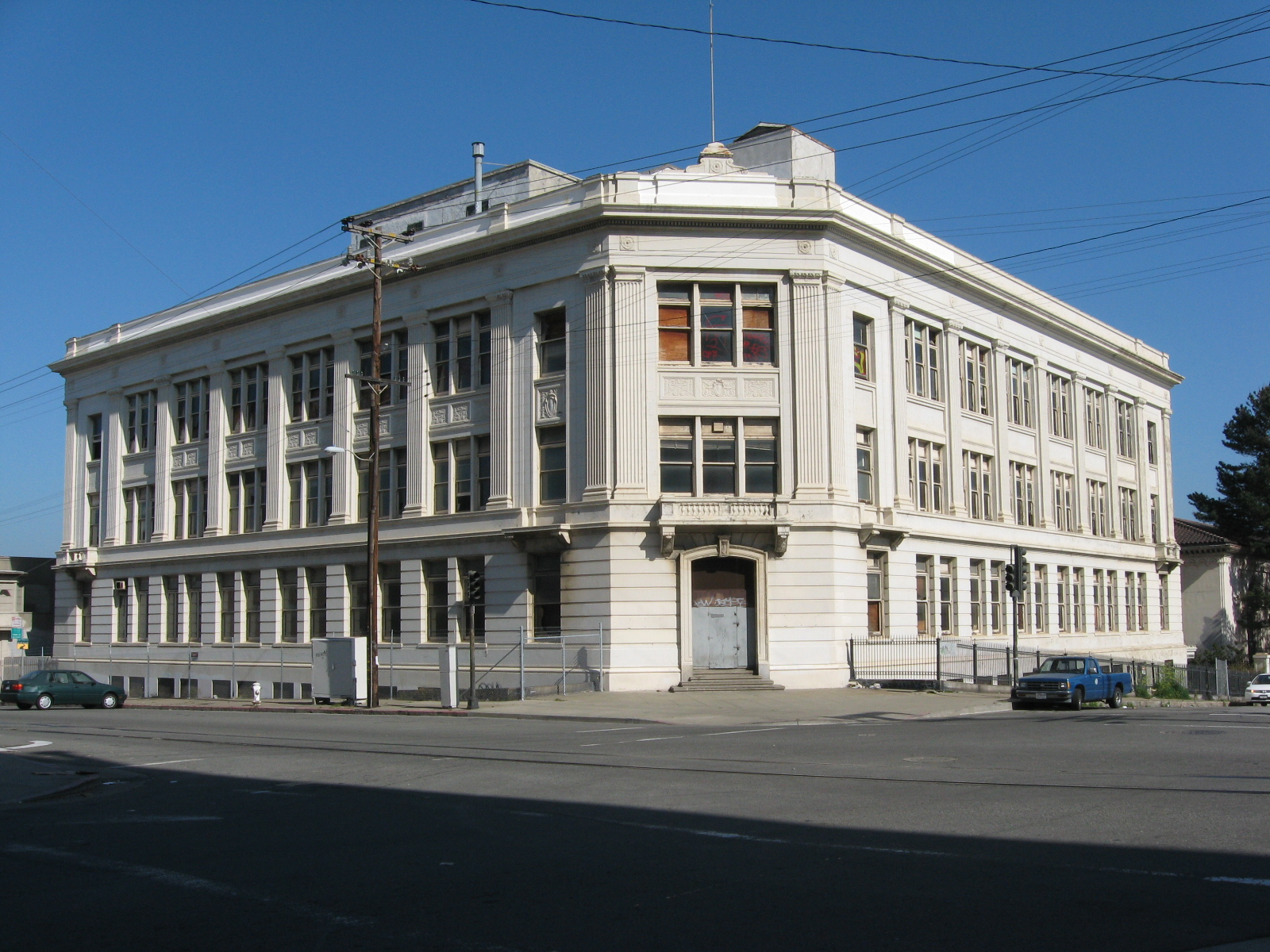
Bethlehem Steel's Administration building in Potrero Point

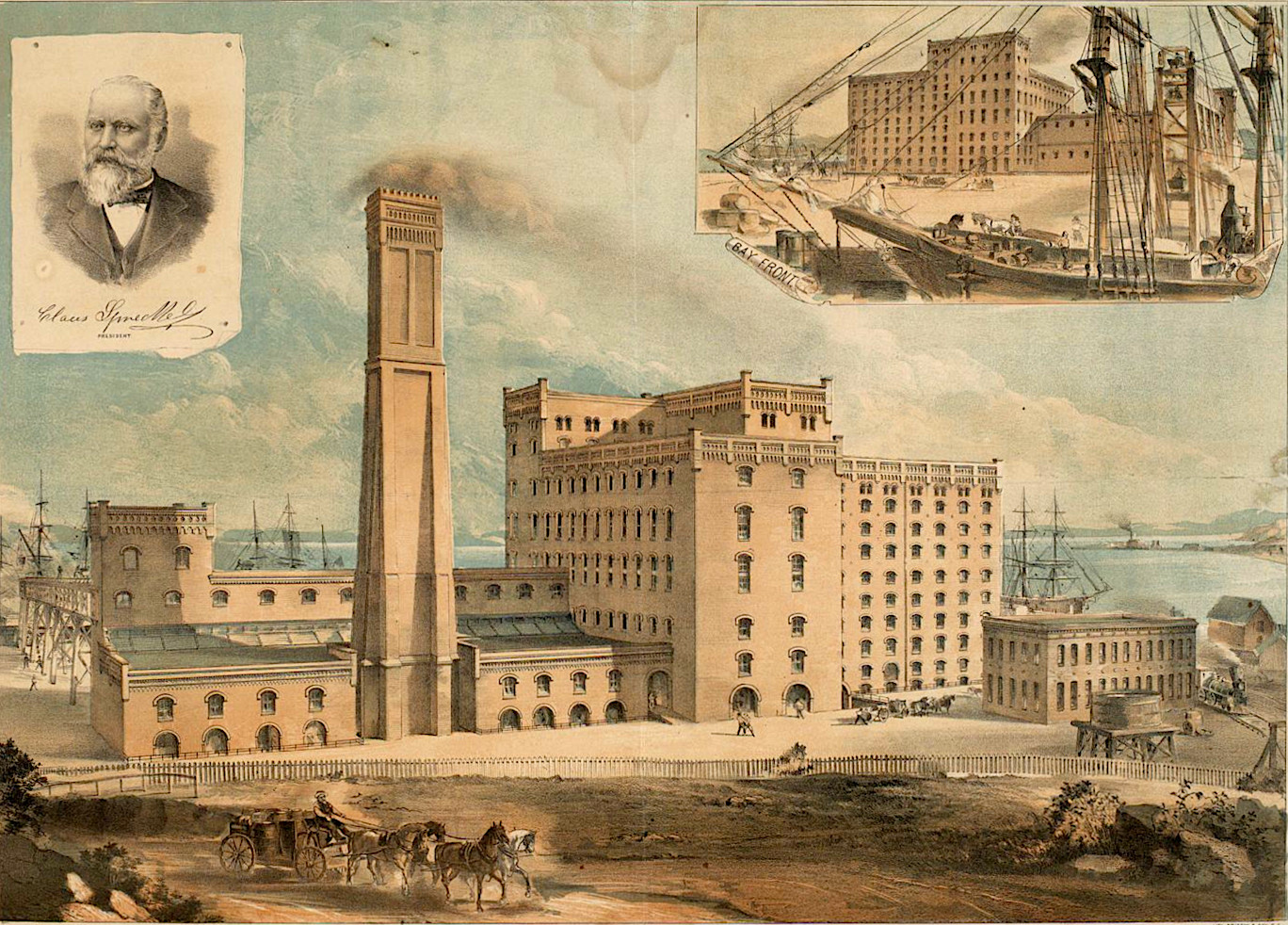
Claus Spreckels Sugar Factory in Potrero Point in 1881

Potrero Point is an area in San Francisco, California, east of San Francisco's Potrero Hill neighborhood. Potrero Point was an early San Francisco industrial area. The Point started as small natural land feature that extends into Mission Bay of San Francisco Bay. The Point was enlarged by blasted and cuts on the nearby cliffs. The cut material was removed and used to fill two square miles into the San Francisco bay, making hundreds of acres of flat land. The first factories opened at Potrero Point in the 1860s. Early factories were powder magazine plant, the Pacific Rolling Mill Company and small shipyards. The large Union Iron Works and its shipyards were built at the site, started in 1849 by Peter Donahue. To power the factories and neighborhood coal and gas-powered electricity works were built, later the site became Pacific Gas and Electric Company (PG&E).

== History ==
Potrero Point was part of Mission Dolores starting in 1776. The Mission used the land for livestock grazing. The military personnel at the Presidio of San Francisco also used part of the land at Potrero Point. With the Mexican secularization act of 1833, the mission lost the use of the land. The land was then owned by Francisco de Haro (1792 – 1849), called Rancho Laguna de la Merced (commonly called Potrero Nuevo) and used for sheep and cattle grazing. Haro's family lost the land following the Mexican-American War in 1849. In 1854, DuPont built a black gunpowder factory at Potrero Point, at the current location of Maryland and Humboldt Streets. With the California Gold Rush and grading for new San Francisco streets, the demand was so high in 1850 that a second gunpowder factory was built at 23rd Street and Maryland Streets. In 1857 San Francisco Cordage Manufactory (later renamed Tubbs Cordage Company) opened a rope-making factory at Potrero Point. In 1866 the Pacific Rolling Mills opened on the site to roll iron, the site was picked as it has deep water docks. Pacific Rolling Mills made products for the building, railroads and street cars in San Francisco. John North moved his shipyard to Potrero Point in 1862. Starting in 1868, on the new land, San Francisco built: piers, foundries, and warehouses.

In 1901 the Southern Pacific completed a rail line through Potrero Point. In 1903 Atchison, Topeka & Santa Fe completed a rail line through Potrero Point.

Union Iron Works became a large shipyard and built US Navy destroyers for World War I. Union Iron Works purchased Risdon Iron Works, the land next to the shipyard. Risdon Iron Works built locomotives, building boilers, iron pipes, steam engines and gas engines. From 1873 to 1909 Risdon Iron Works also built ships, tugs, ferries and barges. John Risdon held the patents for the first river mining dredge. Bethlehem Steel purchased the shipyard in 1917. During the World War II, the yard built: C1-B cargo ships, Atlanta-class cruisers, Benson-class destroyers, Buckley-class destroyer escorts, Allen M. Sumner-class destroyers, YG and YCV Barges and Fletcher-class destroyers.

After the war shipbuilding declined and ended in 1945, and the yards were used for ship repairs and conversions. The shipyard reopened in 1952 and closed again in 1981. The Transbay Tube, the Bay Area Rapid Transit's underwater tunnel, was built in segments at the site in the 1960s. In 1982, the city of San Francisco purchased the Bethlehem Steel site for one dollar and leased the site to Southwest Marine under the name San Francisco Drydock, later selling it to BAE Systems. The site is now Pier 70, San Francisco.

== Current site ==
- Union Iron Works Historic District, E. of Illinois between 18th & 22nd Street, site 184.
- Potrero Point is eligible for the National Register as a historic district for its contribution to three war efforts (Spanish–American War, World War I & World War II) and because of the 19th-century buildings that remain. Some of the buildings are individually eligible for landmarking for their architectural and historic merit. Worthy of historical landmark status is the 1917 Frederick Meyer Renaissance Revival Bethlehem office building, the Charles P. Weeks designed 1912 Power House#1, the 1896 Union Iron Works office designed by Percy & Hamilton, and the huge 1885 Machine shops.
- The Potrero Point Historic District, also referred to as the Central, is an older area that has been rebuilt to look like it did 100 years ago.
- Potrero Generating Station
- Dogpatch, San Francisco, neighborhood on Potrero Point.
- Point San Quentin, former name of part of Potrero Point.
- Crane Cove Park, on the site of part of the shipyard.
- Third Street (San Francisco), main north-south street.
- Museum of Craft and Design, 3rd Street
- Institute of Contemporary Art San Francisco, on Minnesota Street

== See also ==
- Potrero Hill just to the west of Potrero Point.
- Mission Creek just to the north of Potrero Point.
- Islais Creek just to the south of Potrero Point.
- Claus Spreckels opened larger sugar refinery at Potrero Point
- Bethlehem Shipbuilding Corporation
