= Crane Cove Park =

Urban park in California

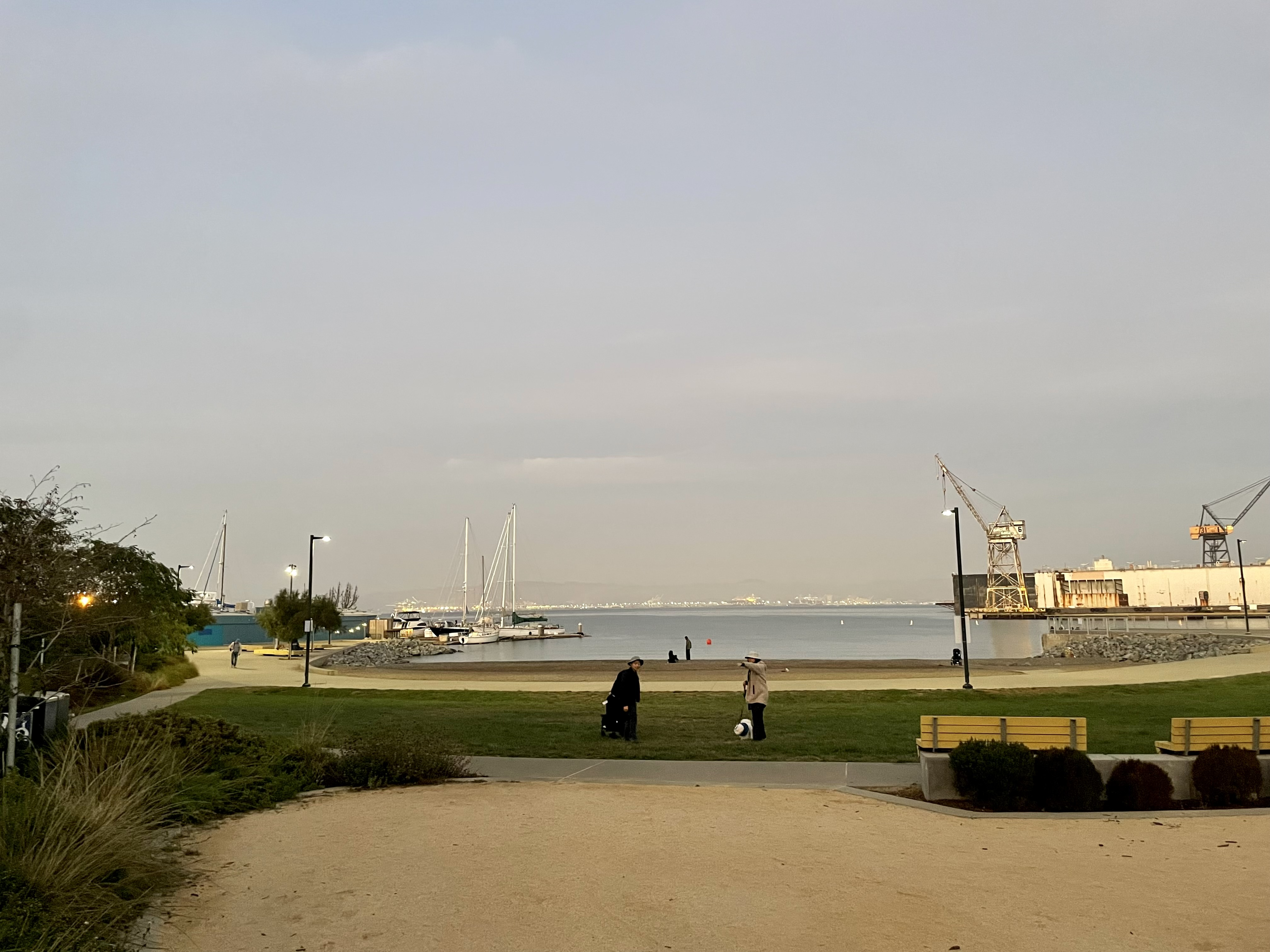
- Crane Crove Park, facing the San Francisco Bay
- Interactive map of Crane Cove Park
- Type: Urban park
- Location: San Francisco, California, United States
- Coordinates: 37°45′47.71″N 122°23′14.51″W
- Area: 7 acres (2.8 ha; 0.011 mi^{2}; 0.028 km^{2})
- Created: 2020
- Operated by: Port of San Francisco
- Open: All year
- Website: www.sfport.com/cranecovepark

Crane Cove Park is a 7-acre (2.8 ha) urban park in Potrero Point, San Francisco, California, located on the city's east-facing waterfront at San Francisco's historic Pier 70. The park opened in 2020. The site used to be a shipbuilding site occupied by the Union Iron Works and the Bethlehem Shipbuilding Corporation.

The park surrounds a large sloped concrete ramp leading to the water and features outlines of various ships launched there, as well as an outline of a segment of the BART Transbay Tube, built and launched there between 1965 and 1969.

The park's name refers to the presence on the waterfront of two historic cranes, called Nick and Nora after the characters in the "Thin Man" films of the '30s and '40s.
