= Irish Hill (San Francisco) =

Neighborhood in San Francisco, California, United States

Coordinates: 37°45′31.15″N 122°23′10.91″W

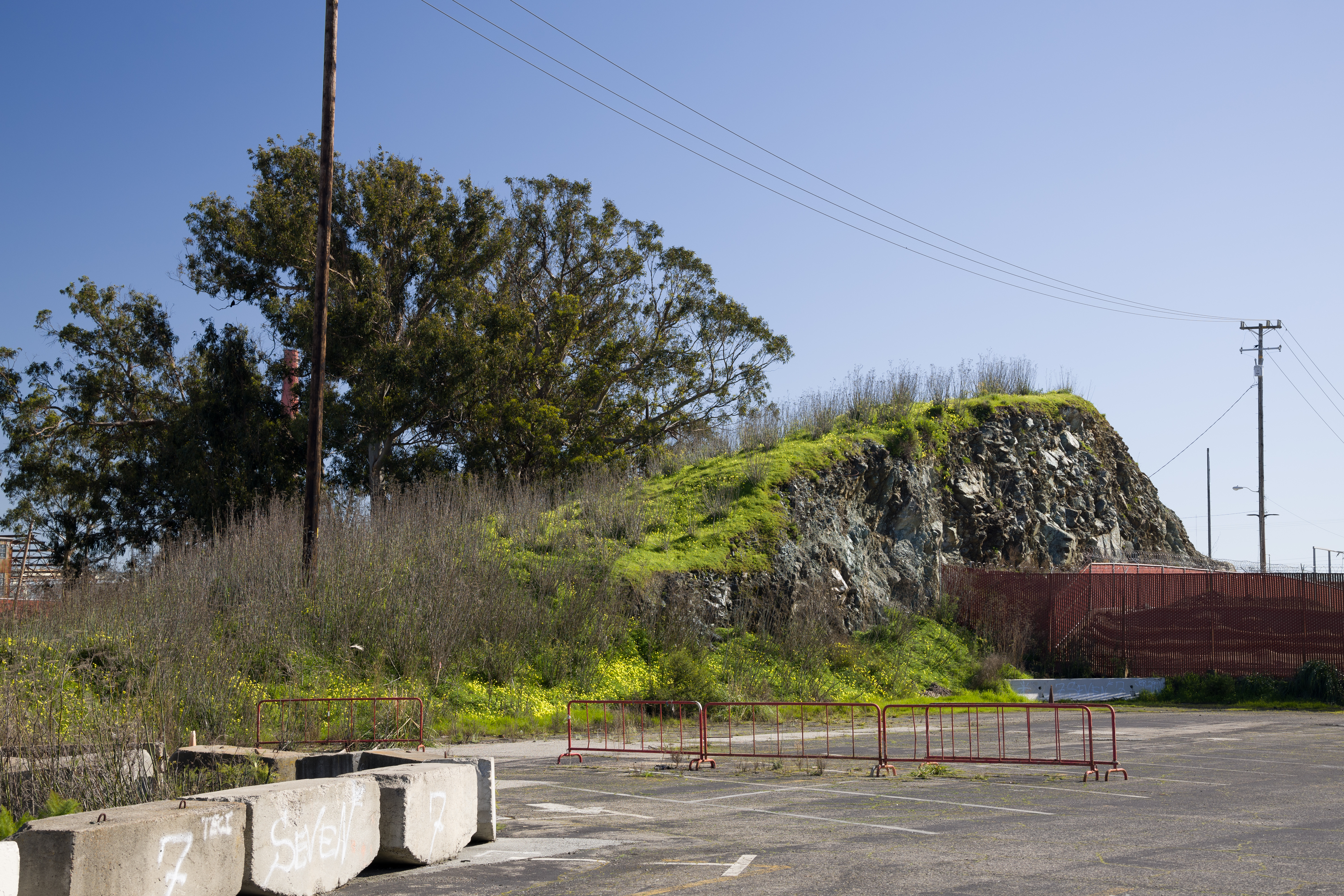
Remains of Irish Hill, February 2025

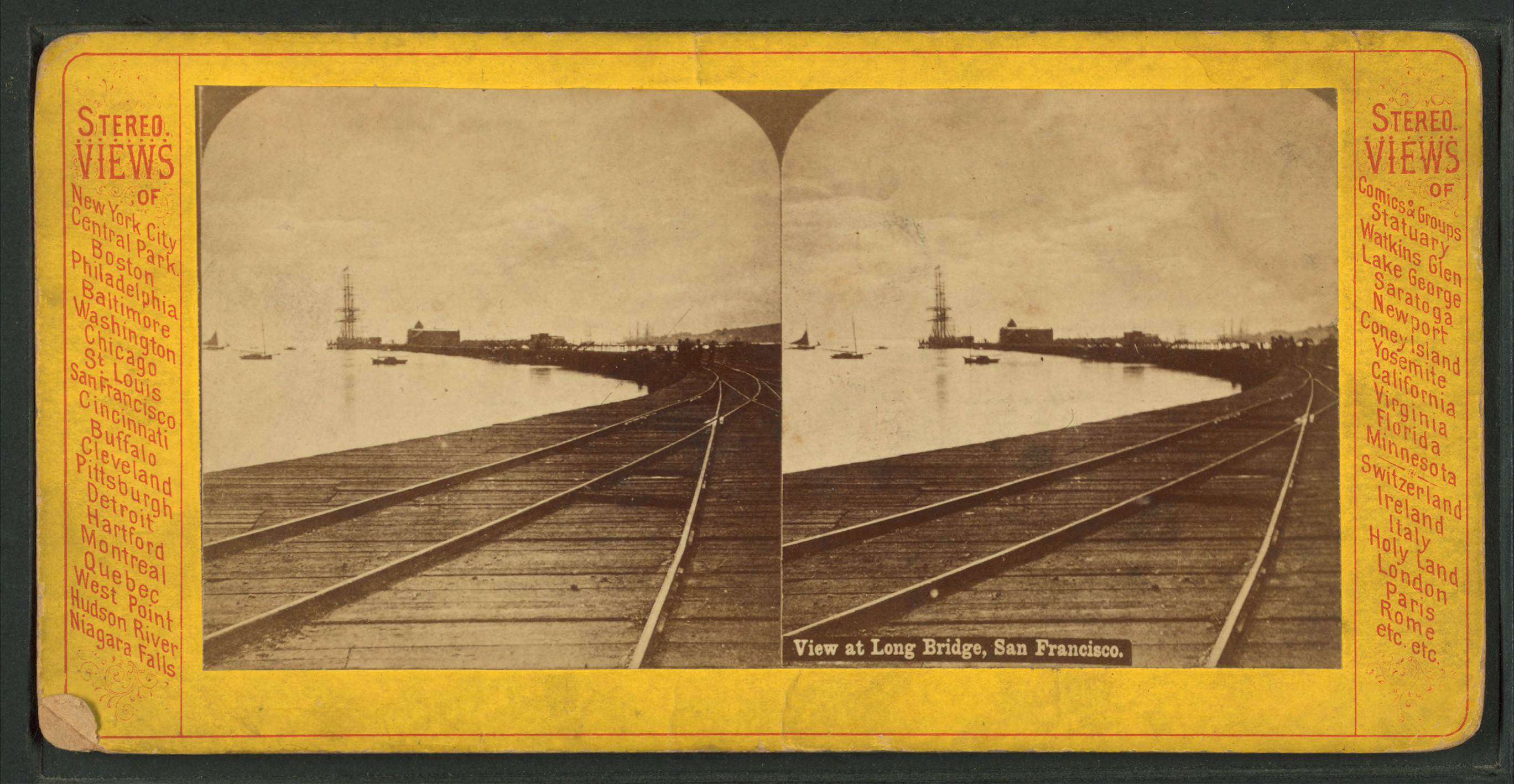
Long Bridge, 1880s

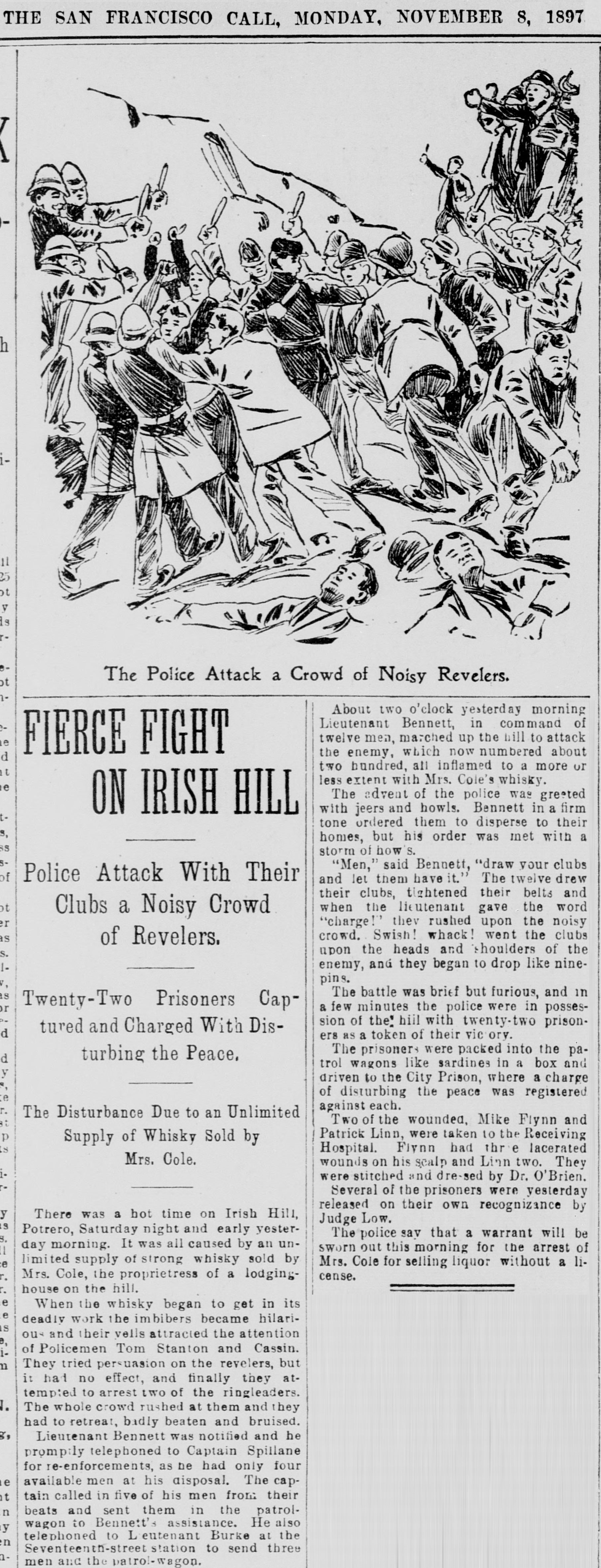
Fierce Fight on Irish Hill San Francisco Call, November 8, 1897.

Irish Hill was a small working-class neighborhood in San Francisco, near the intersection of 22nd Street and Illinois Avenue. Expansion of the local iron and steel works, including leveling of the hill, effaced the neighborhood in the late 19th and early 20th centuries.

The neighborhood was located on a 250-foot hill reached by a wooden stairway at Illinois and 20th streets, and extended from there to the bay. Founded in the 1860s by Irish immigrants, it consisted of approximately 60 small houses and 40 boarding houses and hotels, housing mostly working-class Irish. A large number were single men who worked at Union Iron Works or the Pacific Rolling Mills, in the nearby industrial area known as the Dogpatch. The Union Hotel was run by Frank McManus, a political boss known as the King of Irish Hill.

The neighborhood was destroyed when the hill was flattened in two stages, in the 1880s by quarrying to provide fill for under Long Bridge (now the site of 3rd Street) and starting in 1897, by quarrying and dynamiting to clear space for the expansion of the Union Iron Works and subsequently of Bethlehem Steel. By 1918 it had been reduced to a mound less than 50 feet high.

== See also ==
- South End Rowing Club
- Pier 70, San Francisco
- Union Iron Works
