= Pacific Rolling Mill Company =

- Company type: Private
- Industry: Steel producing foundry
- Founded: 1866

The Pacific Rolling Mill Company was the West’s first iron and steel producing foundry, founded in 1866, in San Francisco, California. (The company was also known as Pacific Rolling Mills and the two names were used interchangeably throughout its history.) Later in its life, through mergers, the company was transformed first into the Judson-Pacific Company, and then into Judson Pacific-Murphy Corporation. In its various guises, Pacific Rolling Mills has produced steel used during the construction of numerous famous buildings and landmarks in the West as well as a number of notable battleships.

== History ==
=== Foundation ===
The company was organized on 10 May 1866 by an august group of investors that included D. O. Mills, William Alvord, and James G. Fair. Other large stockholders included Leland Stanford, James Flood, Alvinza Hayward, and William Ralston. Also among the men associated with this pioneering venture was Patrick Noble who started as a clerk in 1868 and eventually served as an officer of the company. After the Pacific Rolling Mill's original operation closed at Potrero Point, Patrick Noble reorganized and carried on the company at the foot of Potrero Hill, at 17th and Mississippi Streets. Noble's successor enterprise retained the same name as the original company and utilized much of the very same equipment that was first installed at Potrero Point. As documented in the book, A Romance of Steel in California, the Pacific Rolling Mill Company was the genesis of a profound and remarkable pioneering steel-making operation whose work, heritage, and impact journeyed well into the 1950s:

This was the small but not humble beginning of a corporation that in the next three quarters of a century was to be one of the great builders of the West, constructing both the tools of peace and the engines of war, the wheels of transportation and the great members of bridges and office buildings and factories.

(Source: A Romance of Steel in California, p. 9)

=== Significance ===
While its predecessor plant at Potrero Point on the San Francisco Central Waterfront was clearly instrumental in the growth and industrial rise of the Bay Area and California in the period following the Civil War, the successor Pacific Rolling Mill firm in its nearby location in lower Potrero Hill is associated with the advent of steel frame buildings at the turn of the century and the increased popularity of this building method following the Great Fire of 1906. The infrastructure projects for San Francisco and California undertaken in the teens, 20s and 30s, and the build-up of the Bay Area's industrial capacity for the war effort in the 1940s are important not only to Potrero Hill and San Francisco, but also to the entire state of California, and indeed the nation.

The (partial) list of buildings, vessels, and structures listed below spanned decades of production by the Pacific Rolling Mill and its successor companies, the Judson-Pacific Company and the Judson Pacific-Murphy Corporation. The heritage of the Pacific Rolling Mill Company carried on in the executives, workers, and skilled expertise of each subsequent merged company. This legacy lasted well into the 1950s, and even the late 1960s. The four buildings at the 17th & Mississippi Streets site that constitute the last extant structures associated with this steel producer were part of a remarkable and unique story in which outstanding contributions to the history and culture of both San Francisco and California (indeed, the entire Western region) were made. The Pacific Rolling Mill, which began incrementally constructing the buildings at the turn of the 20th century, was a pioneering steel fabrication company led by the visionary Noble family. Patrick Noble and his senior executives created their business from the predecessor Pacific Rolling Mill located at Potrero Point and their legacy at the reorganized Pacific Rolling Mill in lower Potrero Hill continued in successive mergers of the company over an 80-year period.

Founder Patrick Noble died in October 1920. His son, Edward B. Noble, continued leading the company through successive mergers until retirement in 1945.

=== Notable works ===
Landmark buildings and structures that Pacific Rolling Mill Co. and its successor companies helped build include:

- San Francisco Ferry Building (1898)
- Grace Cathedral (1934)
- The hoists on the intake towers of Hoover (Boulder) Dam (1935)
- The approach structures and substantial portions of the main spans of the Golden Gate Bridge (1936) and The San Francisco Bay Bridge (1934)
- Shasta Dam (1937)
- Buildings of the 1915 Panama Pacific Exposition
- The Colorado River Aqueduct (1935)
- The main San Francisco Public Library Building at the San Francisco Civic Center
- The exhibit buildings and the Tower of The Sun at the Golden Gate International Exposition on Treasure Island (1939)
- The early San Francisco Chronicle Buildings (1889 & 1907)
- Wheeler Hall and Doe Library at the UC Berkeley Campus (1916 & 1917)
- The buildings of the Stanford University Campus
- The Fairmont Hotel (1905)
- The Flood Building (1907)
- The State Capitol building in Sacramento (1907)
- The Saint Francis Hotel (1907)
- Bank of California (1907)
- A network of rural post offices and bridges linking up rural Northern California (1907–1940s)
- Mission Savings Bank (1909)
- The Cliff House (1909)
- The Y.M.C.A. building (1909)
- The Anglo & London Paris National Bank (1909)
- San Francisco's City and County Hospital, San Francisco General (1909)
- The original Standard Oil Building (1912)
- Lowell High School (1913)
- Bellaire Tower Apartment Building, San Francisco (1929)
- A series of defense plants, electric traveling cranes, and mechanized landing craft for the war effort during World War II (1920s–1940s)
- Clay Jones Apartments, San Francisco (1930)
- San Francisco Veterans / War Memorial Building (1932)
- San Francisco City and County Jail (1934)
- Bank of America headquarters (1941)
- Appraisers Building, San Francisco (1944)
- San Francisco's Merchandise Market (1947)
- The Richmond – San Rafael Bridge (1955)
- Telescope for the Lick Observatory (1959)

Pacific Rolling Mills has also produced steel that was used in the construction of a number of famous battleships, including:

- USS Olympia, Admiral George Dewey's flagship at the Battle of Manila Bay during the Spanish–American War
- USS Oregon, which also saw action in the Spanish–American War
- USS Charleston, which was the first US protected cruiser that was ever built
- USS Wisconsin
- USS San Francisco
- USS Monterey
