= Mission Creek (Stanley County, South Dakota) =

Stream in South Dakota, U.S.

Coordinates: 44°43′20″N 100°41′14″W

Mission Creek is a stream in the U.S. state of South Dakota.

Mission Creek was named for a Christian mission along its course.

== See also ==
- List of rivers of South Dakota
