= Mission Creek (Texas) =

- Location within Texas Location within the United States

Physical characteristics
- Source
  - coordinates: 28.8477651°N 97.1455446°W
- Mouth
  - coordinates: 28.8738753°N 97.0877659°W

Mission Creek is a stream in Victoria County, Texas, in the United States.

Mission Creek was named from the nearby La Bahia Spanish mission.

== See also ==
- List of rivers of Texas
