= Mission Bay (San Francisco) =

Former bay and estuary in California

Coordinates: 37.77018°N 122.39091°W

Mission Bay was a bay and the estuary of Mission Creek, on the west shore of San Francisco Bay, between Steamboat Point and Point San Quentin or Potrero Point. It is now mostly filled in and is the location of the Mission Bay neighborhood of San Francisco.

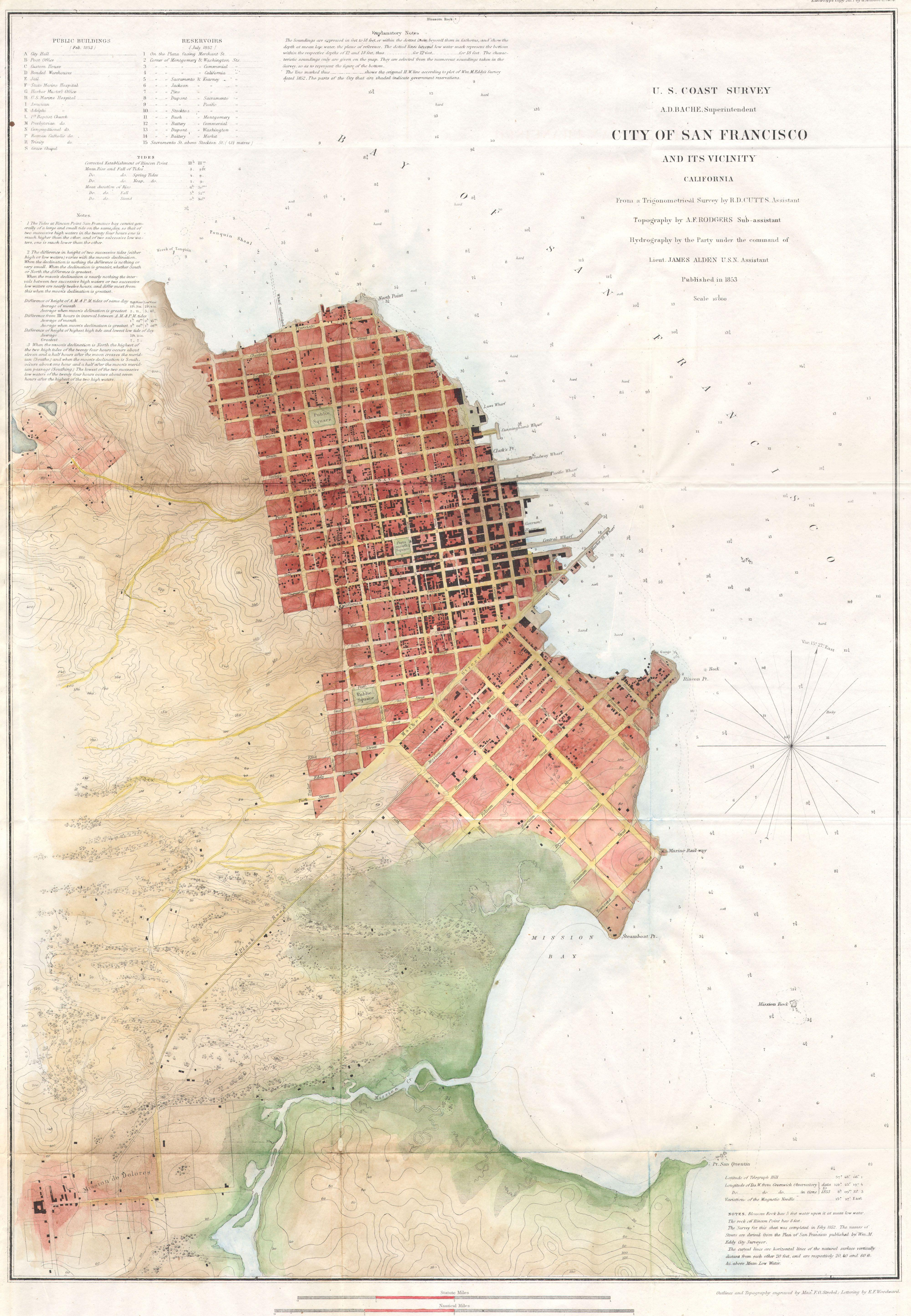
San Francisco shoreline in 1853

== History ==
Mission Bay was a lagoon nestled inside of a +500 acre salt marsh and was occupied by year-round tidal waters. This area was a natural habitat and refuge for large waterfowl populations that included ducks, geese, herons, egrets, ospreys, and gulls. The indigenous people who first inhabited this area were the Yelamu people who spoke the Ramaytush dialect of Ohlone. After the creation of Mission Dolores in 1776, European immigrants exposed the indigenous population to various deadly diseases that decimated the original inhabitants of Mission Bay.

From the 1850s the area was used for shipbuilding and repair, butchery and meat production, and oyster and clam fishing. Beginning in the mid-1800s, in attempts to make this area suitable for building, Mission Bay, like most of the shoreline of the city of San Francisco, was used as a convenient place to deposit refuse from building projects and debris from the 1906 earthquake. As the marsh stabilized with the weight of the infill, the area quickly became an industrial district. With the addition of the railroad, Mission Bay became the home to shipyards, canneries, a sugar refinery, and various warehouses.
