= Mission Creek =

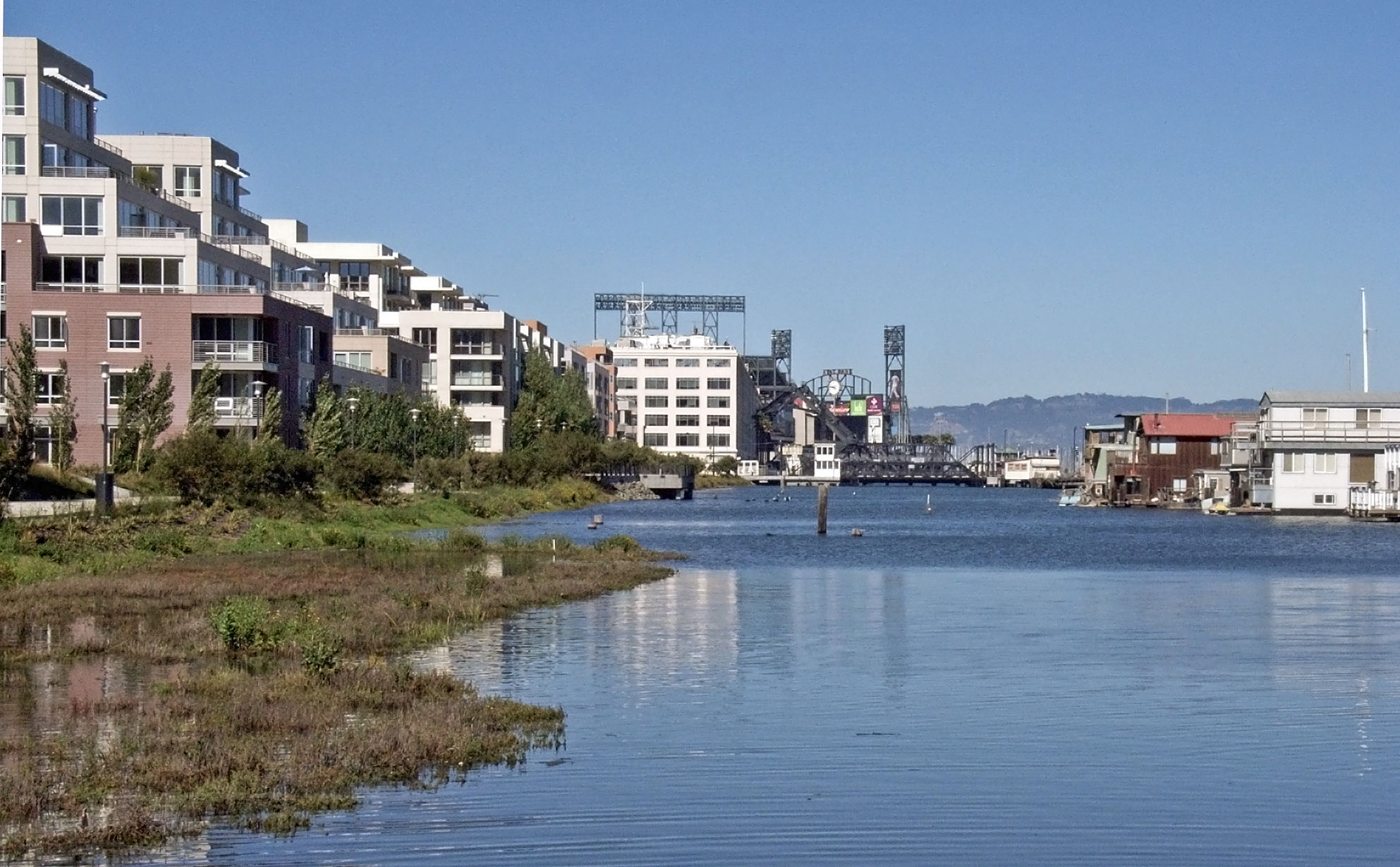
- Mission Creek, looking east.

Location
- Country: United States
- State: California
- Region: San Francisco Bay Area
- City: San Francisco
- District: Mission Bay

Physical characteristics
- Source: Camp and Albion Streets
  - location: San Francisco
  - coordinates: 37.764039°N 122.422702°W
  - elevation: 486 ft (148 m)
- Mouth: China Basin

Mission Creek (from Spanish: misión) is a largely culverted waterway in San Francisco, California. Once navigable from Mission Bay inland to the vicinity of Mission Dolores, where several smaller creeks converged, its remaining above-ground portion is the Mission Creek Channel, which drains into China Basin.

The two Ramaytush Indigenous villages of Chutchui and Sitlintac were located near Mission Creek, with Sitlintac standing on the shore of Mission Bay.

== Background ==
Mission Creek in October 2008

The Spanish named the waterway, Arroyo de Nuestra Señora de los Dolores, in English, "Our Lady of Sorrows Creek." Its Spanish dedication to Señora de los Dolores eventually gave the Mission San Francisco de Asís, founded near its source, its alternate informal name, Mission Dolores. The state legislature declared Mission Creek a navigable stream in 1854, though much of it was removed from that designation in 1874 and later filled in.

Soil liquefaction, such as that which killed numerous people in the 1906 San Francisco earthquake, has been known to occur along buried portions of the creek.

The China Basin Building was erected on the creek's north bank in the 1920s and used for off-loading and processing bananas through the 1950s. In the 1970s it was known as the Del Monte Building and used as a food distribution site by the Hearst family in response to the demands of the Symbionese Liberation Army.

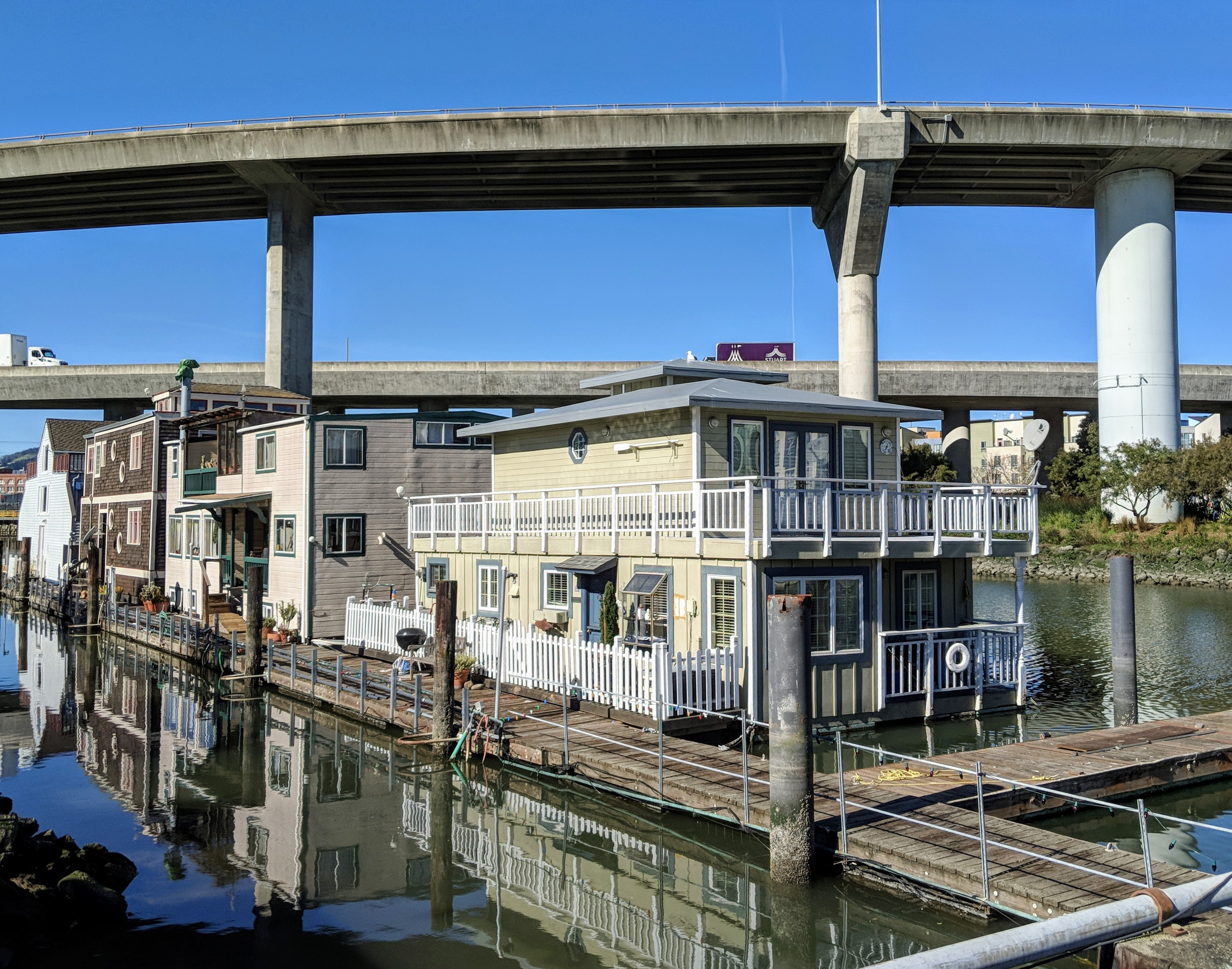
Houseboats on Mission Creek with Interstate 280 freeway ramps above

A community of house boats has existed along the creek's south bank since 1960 when the state of California moved the houseboat community there from Islais Creek to make way for merchant ship trading.

== Hydrology ==
Before 19th-century urban development, tributaries of Mission Creek flowed from the eastern slopes of Twin Peaks into the creek’s surrounding wetlands. The creek’s historical course included part of present-day Division Street and extended south toward 18th Street. Urban growth and land reclamation led to the filling of these wetlands.

== Ecology and wildlife ==
Historically, the Mission Creek watershed and surrounding wetlands supported diverse ecosystems, ranging from scrub-covered sand dunes to tidal mudflats. Habitat restoration by the Mission Creek Conservancy and Catellus enhanced the channel’s tidal banks with native vegetation, including pickleweed, saltgrass, and sea lavender. Reduced sewage overflows improved water quality. Ginny Stearns reported 85 bird species at Mission Creek, including herons, egrets, and kingfishers. The channel also supports butterflies and aquatic life.

== Infrastructure ==
Two historic drawbridges designed by the Strauss Company, the Lefty O’Doul 3rd Street Bridge and the Peter R. Maloney 4th Street Bridge, cross the Mission Creek Channel, with the Fourth Street Bridge carrying Muni’s T-Third light rail line.Beyond Oracle Park’s right-field wall lies McCovey Cove, where home runs landing directly in the water are known as “splash hits.”

== Lake Dolores ==
Historically known as Laguna de Nuestra Señora de los Dolores (Lake of Our Lady of Sorrows), Lake Dolores was a shallow freshwater lagoon fed by Dolores Creek that drained into Mission Creek. The extent of the lake varied with seasonal rainfall. The original Mission Dolores chapel stood beside the lagoon, where Francisco Palóu celebrated Mass on June 29, 1776.

== Bibliography ==
- Olmsted, Nancy (1986). Vanished Waters: A History of San Francisco's Mission Bay. San Francisco: Mission Creek Conservancy. ISBN 0961149213.
- Olmsted, Nancy; Carlsson, Chris; Isaacson, Bob (2010). Vanished Waters: A History of San Francisco's Mission Bay (2nd ed.). San Francisco: Mission Creek Conservancy.
