= Rancho Bolsa de Tomales =

Mexican land grant in California

Coordinates: 38.260°N 122.890°W

Rancho Bolsa de Tomales was a Mexican land grant in present day Marin County and Sonoma County, California given in 1846 by Governor Pío Pico to Juan Nepomuceno Padilla. The name means "the Pool of the Tomales Indians," which referred to Burbank’s Lake. The grant extended along the Pacific coast from Estero de San Antonio south to Walker Creek, and encompassed present day Tomales. Stemple Creek transversed the property. The land claim was rejected as fraudulent by the US Supreme Court.

== History ==
Juan Nepomuceno Padilla (1824–) came from Mexico to California. Padilla was elected as the alcalde of Yerba Buena in 1845. Padilla was involved in a dispute with José de la Cruz Sánchez and his brother Francisco Sanchez, over the position. In 1845, Pio Pico awarded Padilla the four square league Rancho Roblar de la Miseria, in Sonoma County and later, the five square league Rancho Bolsa de Tomales. During the Bear Flag Revolt in June 1846, a band of Californios led by Captain Juan Padilla, killed two members of the Bear Flag Party, Thomas Cowie and George Fowler. Padilla and his band to retreated to Rancho Olompali, and a group of Americans set fire to Padilla’s Sonoma ranch.

In 1848, after he returned from Los Angeles, Padilla, who long had been blamed for the murders in Santa Rosa, was attacked by a group of former Bear Flaggers in a Sonoma hotel. In 1849, Padilla sold Rancho Bolsa de Tomales to Felix Berreyesa and Jesus Molina. In 1850 Padilla sold Rancho Roblar de la Miseria, and returned to Los Angeles. Juan Nepomuceno Padilla married Maria Marta Avila (1825–) in 1851.

With the cession of California to the United States following the Mexican–American War, the 1848 Treaty of Guadalupe Hidalgo provided that the land grants would be honored. As required by the Land Act of 1851, a claim for Rancho Bolsa de Tomales was filed with the Public Land Commission in 1852. The grant was confirmed by Land Commission and by the District Court, but reversed by the US Supreme Court on the basis of doubtful character of the claim and sent back to the District Court for re-examination. The District Court again confirmed the grant, a group of squatters who had been living on the ranch appealed the decision and the case went back to US Supreme Court. The US Supreme Court found "the production of a fraudulent and false certificate of approval signed by the governor and secretary who signed the grant and proved by the same witnesses in the same way that the grant was proved, affords (in the absence of explanatory evidence,) strong ground for believing all the title papers to be fabricated", and the claim was rejected.
