= Rancho Roblar de la Miseria =

Mexican land grant in California

Coordinates: 38.290°N 122.730°W

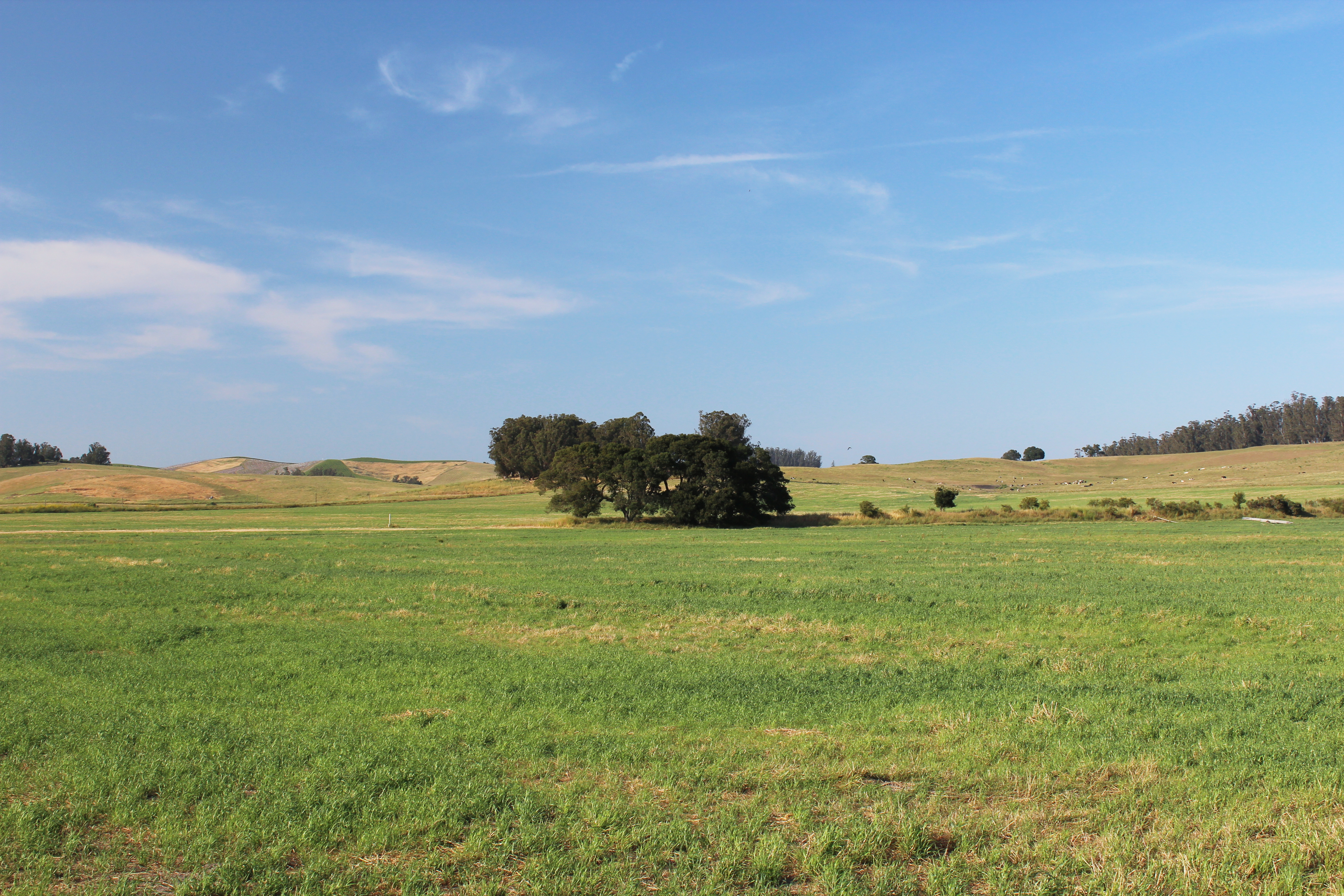
- Current picture of the former Rancho Roblar de la Miseria on Pepper Rd. Near Mecham Rd.
- Interactive map of Rancho Roblar de la Miseria

Rancho Roblar de la Miseria was a 16,887-acre (68.34 km^{2}) Mexican land grant in present-day Sonoma County, California given in 1845 by Governor Pío Pico to Juan Nepomuceno Padilla. "El Roblar de la Miseria" means "The Oak of the Misery". The grant extended along the Petaluma River from Hessel, Roblar, Liberty and Two Rock south to Petaluma.

== History ==
Juan Nepomuceno Padilla (1824–) came from Mexico to California. Padilla was elected as the alcalde of Yerba Buena in 1845. Padilla was involved in a dispute over the position with José de la Cruz Sánchez and his brother Francisco Sanchez. In 1845, Pio Pico awarded Padilla the four square league Rancho Roblar de la Miseria, and later, Padilla received the five square league Rancho Bolsa de Tomales in Marin County.

During the Bear Flag Revolt in June 1846, a band of Californios led by Captain Juan Padilla, killed two members of the Bear Flag Party, Thomas Cowie and George Fowler. Padilla and his band to retreated to Rancho Olompali, and a group of Americans set fire to Padilla’s Sonoma ranch. In 1848, after he returned from Los Angeles, Padilla, who long had been blamed for the murders in Santa Rosa, was attacked by a group of former Bear Flaggers in a Sonoma hotel. In 1849, Padilla sold Rancho Bolsa de Tomales. In 1850 Padilla sold all of Rancho Roblar de la Miseria, except one half square league to be taken from the southeast corner, to Mariano Guadalupe Vallejo and his son-in-law, John B. Frisbee, and returned to Los Angeles. Juan Nepomuceno Padilla married Maria Marta Avila (1825–) in 1851.

In 1850, soon after purchasing it, Vallejo and Frisbee sold Rancho Roblar de la Miseria to Daniel Wright, Erwin Hill, Edward E. Dunbar, Hardin Bigelow, Francis Salmon, John S. Ellis, and A.N. Norstrand.

With the cession of California to the United States following the Mexican-American War, the 1848 Treaty of Guadalupe Hidalgo provided that the land grants would be honored. As required by the Land Act of 1851, a claim for Rancho Roblar de la Miseria was filed with the Public Land Commission in 1852, and the grant was patented to Bigelow, Dunbar, Ellis, Hill, Norstrand, Salmon, Wright and Frisbee in 1858.

In 1852, Daniel Wright, Francis Salmon and others, claimed to Land Commission, that in 1850, Padilla sold the one half square league to Dr. August F. Heyermann, and they added Heyermann to the claim. However, in 1860, Padilla sold the half square league to Gustave Touchard, Clement Beyreau and Abram W. Thompson. In 1863, Francis Salmon, one of the grantees of Vallejo and Frisbie, commenced a suit to recover the half square league. The California Supreme Court ruled that was no legal evidence that Padilla had ever sold the half square league to Heyermann.
