= Juan Nepomuceno Padilla =

Californio politician

10th Alcalde of San Francisco
- In office 1845–1845
- Preceded by: William Sturgis Hinckley
- Succeeded by: José de la Cruz Sánchez

Personal details
- Born: c. 1824
- Spouse: María Marta Ávila

Juan Nepomuceno Padilla was a Californio politician and soldier, who served as the 10th Alcalde of San Francisco.

== Life ==
Padilla was involved in a dispute with José de la Cruz Sánchez and his brother Francisco Sanchez, over the position. In 1845, Pio Pico awarded Padilla the four square league Rancho Roblar de la Miseria, in Sonoma County and later, the five square league Rancho Bolsa de Tomales.

During the Bear Flag Revolt in June 1846, a band of Californios led by Nepomuceno, killed two members of the Bear Flag Party, Thomas Cowie and George Fowler. Padilla and his band to retreated to Rancho Olompali, and a group of Americans set fire to Padilla's Sonoma ranch.

He married María Marta Ávila in 1851.

In 1848, after he returned from Los Angeles, Padilla, who long had been blamed for the murders in Santa Rosa, was attacked by a group of former Bear Flaggers in a Sonoma hotel. In 1849, Padilla sold Rancho Bolsa de Tomales to Felix Berreyesa and Jesus Molina. In 1850 Padilla sold Rancho Roblar de la Miseria, and returned to Los Angeles. Juan Nepomuceno Padilla married Maria Marta Avila (1825–) in 1851.
