= Ben Wood =

British artist

Ben Wood (born 1980, in Shoreham-By-Sea, United Kingdom) is a British visual artist living and working in San Francisco. Over the past decade he has carried out public projects in San Francisco and exhibited in Mexico City, Honolulu and the United Kingdom. Many of his projects use digital media to display images in the built environment.

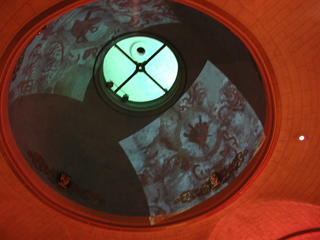
Photo of projection of Sacred Hearts onto Basilica dome, January 23 to February 7, 2004

An early public project was to reveal a hidden 18th-century mural in San Francisco's Mission Dolores. In 2004 he worked with archeologist Eric Blind to capture the first photographs of the mural, keeping the 1796 reredos intact. He then projected digital images in a public display onto the interior dome of the Mission Dolores Basilica. On 14 April 2011 a recreated version of the mural was unveiled on San Francisco's Bartlett Street as part of the Mission Community Market.

Since 2004 Wood has conducted a series of video projections at Coit Tower, mostly illuminating native San Francisco and California heritage. These were presented in 2004, 2006, 2008 and 2009.

While a student at the Massachusetts Institute of Technology Wood carried out a project to re-create the famous mural Man at the Crossroads painted by Diego Rivera in 1933 for the Rockefeller Center and destroyed in early, after controversy about its supposedly anti-capitalist imagery. Also while a student at MIT he created a documentary about MIT's oldest graduate dormitory, Ashdown House.
