= Mission Hospice =

Historical place in San Mateo County, United States

Mission Dolores Outpost Mission Hospice Mission San Mateo
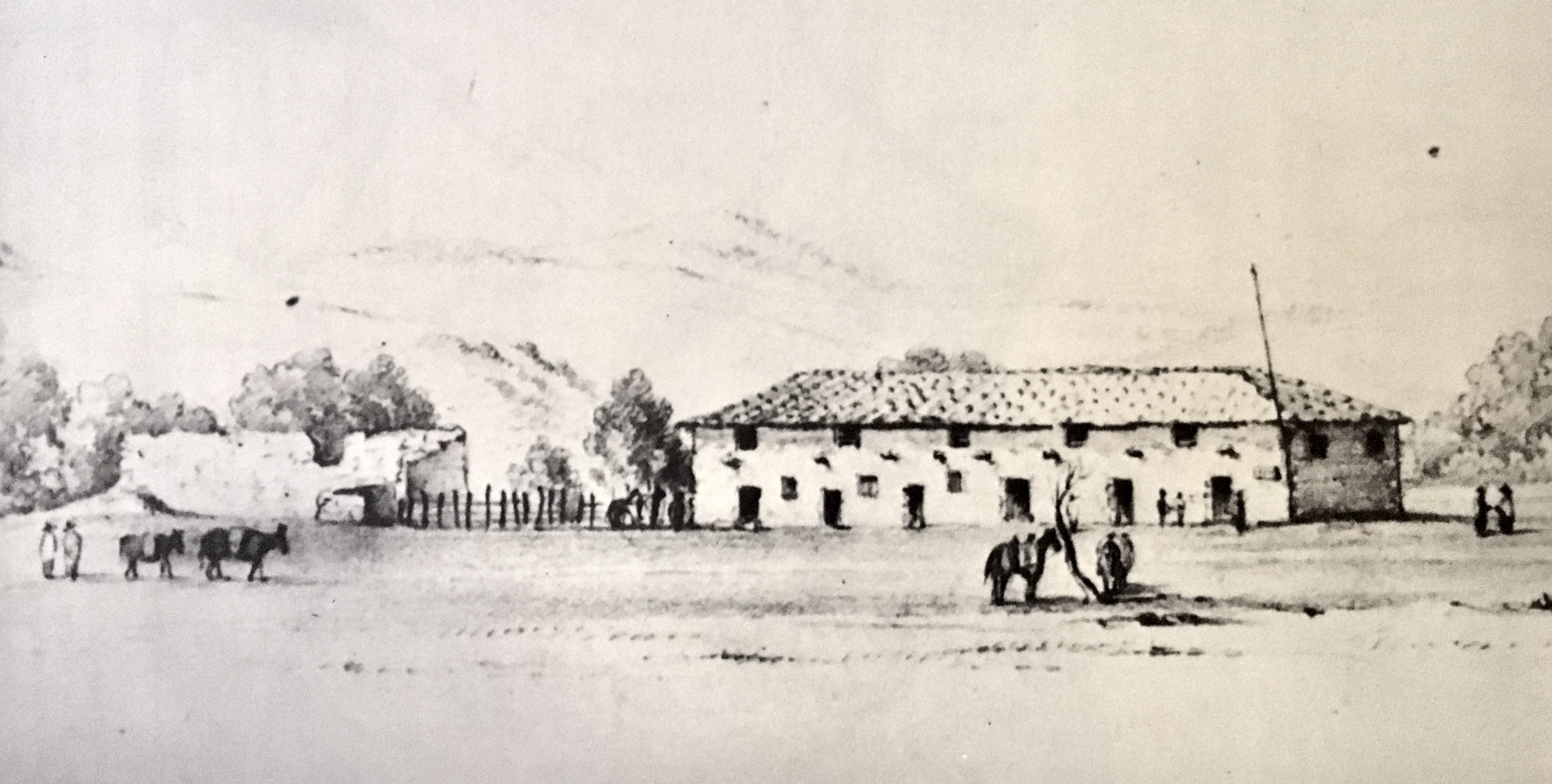
- Mission Dolores Outpost Granary as an inn in 1850

- Location within California Location within the United States
- 37.56505°N 122.3280°W
- Location: El Camino Real, Highway 82, San Mateo, California

History
- Built: 1786

Site notes
- Architect: Spanish Padres
- Architectural style: Adobe Monterey Colonial

California Historical Landmark
- Designated: March 8, 1948
- Reference no.: 393

Mission Hospice, also called (Mission Dolores Outpost and Mission San Mateo), is a historical site in San Mateo, California, in San Joaquin County on the San Mateo Creek. It is a California Historical Landmark, listed as No. 393 on March 8, 1948.

Mission Dolores Outpost was built by Spanish Padres with New Spain in 1786. The outpost was a resting spot on the El Camino Real trail running north to south to the Spanish missions in California. Mission Dolores Outpost was the stop between Mission Santa Clara de Asís and Mission San Francisco de Asís. The Mission Dolores outpost also worked with the local Natives to feed the mission, and natives of Mission Dolores had a farm outpost at an Ohlone village. The outpost also raised cattle and food was also taken to Mission San Francisco de Asís.

The two main adobe buildings at the site were the large granary building and small chapel. Mission Dolores Outpost was abandoned in about 1793 after diseases killed most of the native population. After the Mexican secularization act of 1833, the large granary building was used as an inn on the El Camino road. The mission land became Rancho San Mateo and Rancho de las Pulgas. In 1849 the output buildings also became a stagecoach stop, opened by Nicolas de Peyster. None of the Mission Hospice buildings now exist; the site is the center of city of San Mateo.

The Mission Dolores Outpost historical marker is at Southwest corner of Baywood/(Baldwin) and El Camino Real-California State Route 82 in San Mateo, placed there by the Anson Burlingame Chapter of the Daughters of the American Revolution.

== See also ==
- California Historical Landmarks in San Mateo County
- Sánchez Adobe Park
- San Pedro y San Pablo Asistencia
