= Sánchez Adobe Park =

Historic house in California, United States

- Sanchez Adobe Park
- U.S. National Register of Historic Places
- U.S. Historic district
- California Historical Landmark
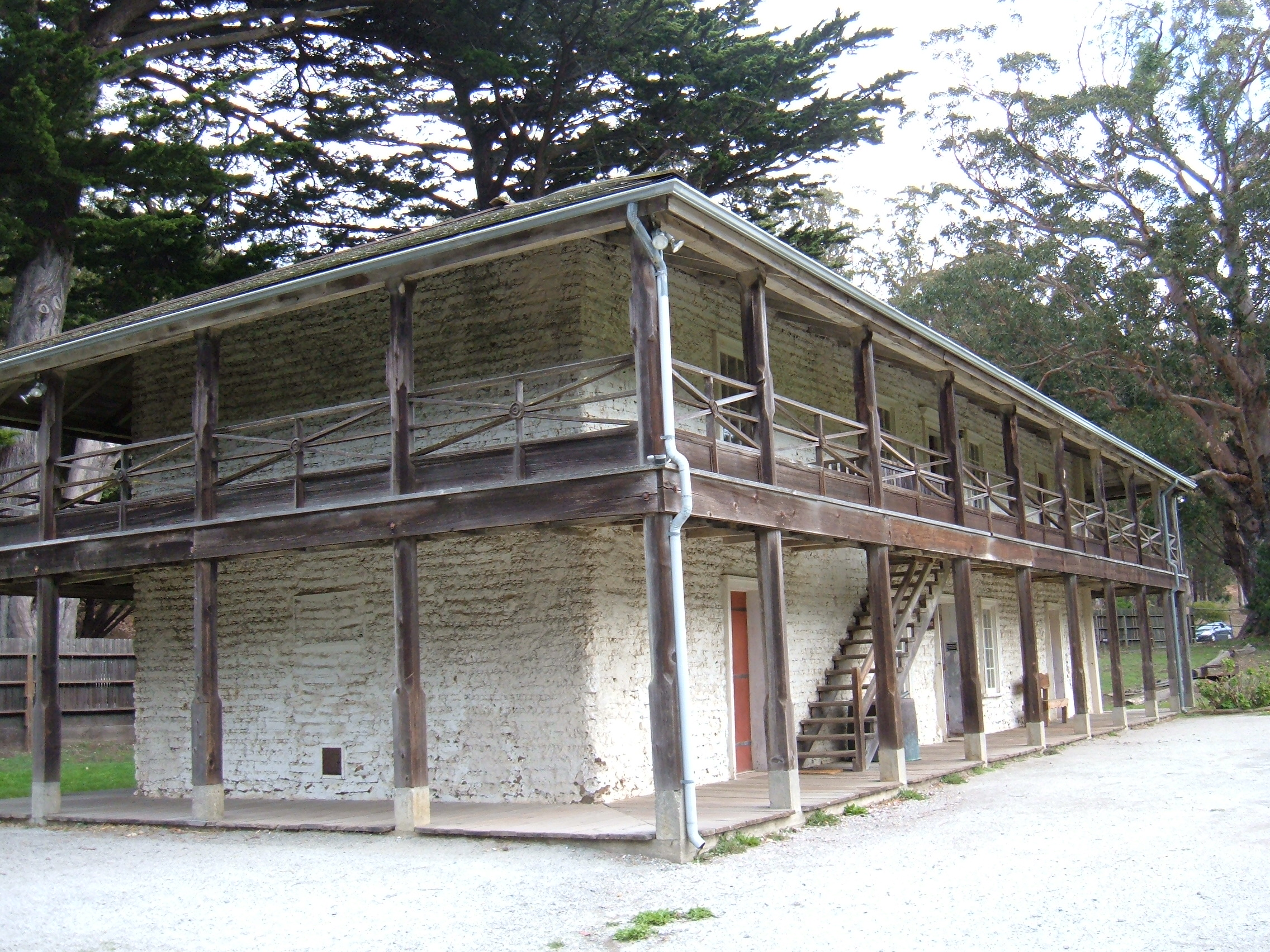

- Location within San Francisco Bay Area Location within California Location within the United States
- Location: Linda Mar Blvd., 1 mi. E of CA 1, Pacifica, California
- Coordinates: 37°35′18″N 122°29′38″W
- Area: 5 acres (2.0 ha)
- Built: 1785; 241 years ago
- Architect: Multiple
- Architectural style: Adobe–Spanish Colonial
- NRHP reference No.: 76000525
- CHISL No.: 391
- Added to NRHP: April 13, 1976

The Sánchez Adobe Park, home to the Sánchez Adobe, is located in Pacifica, California, at 1000 Linda Mar Boulevard, on the north bank of San Pedro Creek, approximately 0.91 miles (1,470 m) from the Pacific Ocean in Linda Mar Valley. The 5.46-acre (2.21 ha) county park, established in 1947 contains the Sanchez Adobe Historical site, designated a National Register Historical District in 1976 and is California registered landmark 391.

== History ==
The park site has a long and rich history. The Sánchez Adobe at the park is considered the finest example of Mexican era architecture in San Mateo County. Archaeological and historical evidence identify four main periods of history, followed by the purchase of the site by the County of San Mateo in 1947.

=== Native American Ohlone history ===
Prior to 1786, the Ramaytush band of the Ohlone people had a settlement on the site, the village of Pruristac. Evidence of the village remains by a shell midden, located near the present day park ranger building. The Spanish explorer Gaspar de Portolà camped nearby in 1769, ~1 mile (1.6 km) to the west from 31 October through 3 November, during the Portolà expedition in the upper Las Californias Province of New Spain. Journals from the expedition record of his group's meetings with the villagers, describe hunting and eating a grizzly bear, and the construction of the village structures.

The first indigenous person baptised at the Mission San Francisco de Asís (Mission Dolores) was the 20-year-old Chamis in 1777. He was from the Ohlone village of Chutchui, and his mother lived at Pruristac. In 1782 and 1783, many of the people in Pruristac, including the village captain Mossués and village leader Liquiique with their wives and daughters, went through Indian Reductions and relocated as Mission Indians to Mission Dolores. The mission was near the pueblo of Yerba Buena, which in 1847 become the city of San Francisco in Alta California. Two men of this group from Pruristac, with the baptismal names Hilarion and George, served as Indian leaders at Mission Dolores. They were alcades of the mission at the time of their deaths in 1807, while part of a Spanish posse during a skirmish with the Suisunes tribe.

=== Mission period: 1786 to 1834 ===
In 1776 the Spanish established a Mission and Presidio at nearby San Francisco, and baptismal records identify many Ohlone people from Pruristac emigrated to Mission Dolores. In 1786, the Mission established a asistencia, an outpost known as San Pedro y San Pablo Asistencia, at the site for the purpose of Missionary work and farming in support of the Mission. The site consisted of a granary, a chapel and four other rooms surrounding three sides of a plaza. Little remains of these original buildings, but archeological study has identified the location to be at the northeastern part of the park grounds. Initially, the farming included wheat, corn, beans, barley, asparagus, peas, rosemary, grape, peach and quince. Four years later, the farming was abandoned following a dramatic decline in the Native American population, after which the outpost subsisted through cattle ranching. The outpost was abandoned in 1834 with the dismantling of the California Mission network.

=== Mexican rancho period: 1839 to 1848 ===
Francisco Sánchez, Commandante of the San Francisco Presidio and eighth alcade of the City of San Francisco, was awarded a land grant by the government of Mexico that included much of what is now northwestern San Mateo County. He built an adobe residence near the center of this 9,000-acre (36 km^{2}) ranch, known as Rancho San Pedro, in the San Pedro Valley (now Linda Mar Valley) at the site of the abandoned Mission Outpost San Pedro y San Pablo. It is widely speculated that he reused some of the bricks from the Outpost to construct the Adobe, which he began in 1842 and completed in 1846.

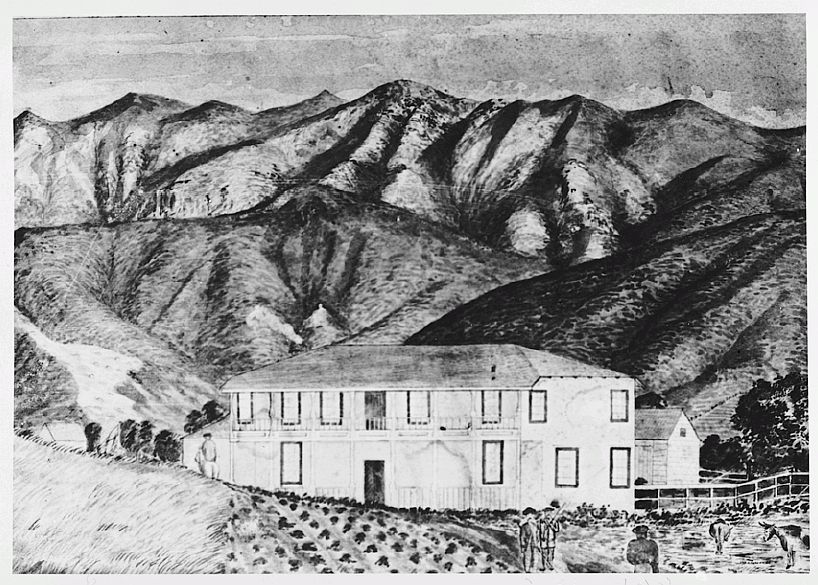
The Sánchez Adobe during the Kirkpatrick Period, 1885

=== American/Kirkpatrick period: 1871 to 1946 ===
Edward Kirkpatrick purchased the property in 1871 and remodeled the Adobe extensively during the late 1880s, enlarging it to twenty rooms. In the following decades, the Adobe served a variety of purposes including a hotel called the Adobe House, and during Prohibition as a speakeasy. Ultimately, the Adobe served as a farm building associated with artichoke farming in San Pedro Valley during the 1940s.

=== Modern period ===
The County of San Mateo purchased the Sánchez Adobe and the surrounding 5.46-acre (2.21 ha) in 1947, and began a comprehensive restoration project completed in 1953. This included structural and architectural restoration of the Adobe and construction of several outbuildings on the park property including a caretakers residence. In 2002, the Adobe was further restored with a new roof.

The City of Pacifica celebrates early California history with an annual event in mid-September known as Rancho Days, including music, historical reenactments and food.

Hundreds gathered on October 26, 2019, at the Sanchez Adobe site to celebrate the Ohlone, the first inhabitants of the Peninsula. This was the first "Ohlone Day" celebration and was highlighted by special salutes to the first people who lived at the site, the Aramai of the Ramaytush Ohlone village of Pruristac. The park also opened a new visitor center the same day.

The San Mateo County History Museum operates Sanchez Adobe as an historic house museum. Visitors can explore the home, look at artifacts from archaeological digs and view the location of the original farm buildings. Admission is free. The museum offers school programs designed to teach students about life on a California rancho.

== See also ==
- California Historical Landmarks in San Mateo County
- Mission Dolores Outpost
- Mission Santa Clara de Asís
- Mission San Francisco de Asís
- Rancho San Mateo
- Rancho de las Pulgas

== Bibliography ==
- Milliken, Randall (1995). A Time of Little Choice. Menlo Park. Ballena Press. ISBN 0-87919-131-7

== Historic designations ==
- National Register of Historic Places #NPS–76000525 - Sánchez Adobe Park in Pacifica, California (site of the San Pedro y San Pablo Asistencia)
- California Historical Landmark #391 - Sánchez Adobe
- Early History of the California Coast, a National Park Service Discover Our Shared Heritage Travel Itinerary
