= San Pedro y San Pablo Asistencia =

Former 18th-century Spanish asistencia in California

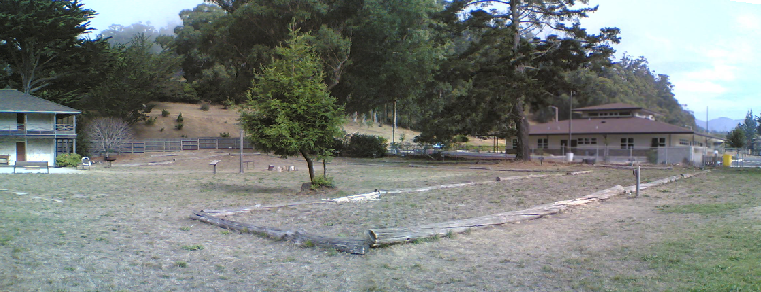
- The perimeter of the outpost's foundation is outlined with logs.

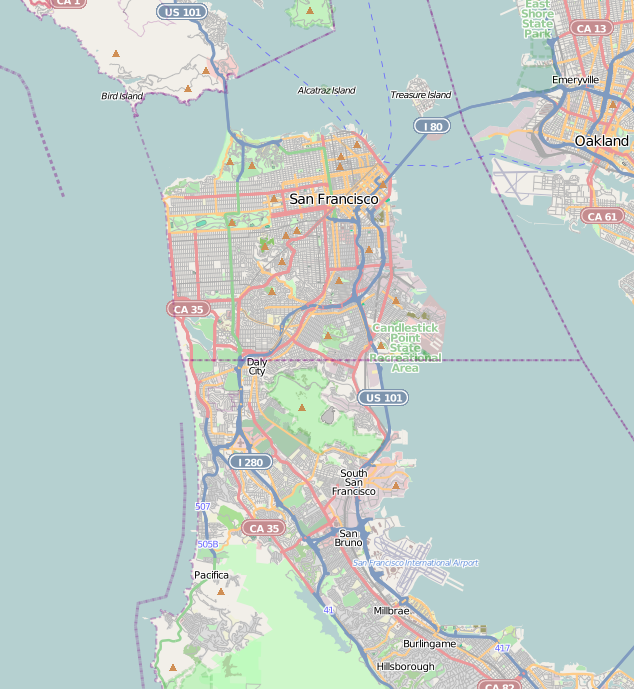
- Location on the San Francisco Peninsula San Pedro y San Pablo Asistencia (California)
- Location: Pacifica, California
- Coordinates: 37°35′14″N 122°29′36″W
- Name as founded: Asistencia de la Misión San Francisco de Asís
- English translation: Sub-Mission of the Mission San Francisco de Asís
- Patron: Saint Peter and Saint Paul
- Founded: 1786
- Military district: Fourth
- Native tribe(s) Spanish name(s): Ohlone; Costanoan
- Native place name: Pruristac
- Governing body: County of San Mateo
- Current use: Museum

U.S. National Register of Historic Places
- Designated: 1976
- Part of: Sánchez Adobe
- Reference no.: #NPS–76000525

California Historical Landmark
- Designated: 1947
- Part of: Sánchez Adobe
- Reference no.: #391

The San Pedro y San Pablo Asistencia is an asistencia or "sub-mission" to Mission San Francisco de Asís in the San Pedro Valley in Pacifica, California. Established in 1786 at the Ohlone village of Pruristac, the site is located within the bounds of the Rancho San Pedro (home to the Sánchez Adobe).

== History ==
Within the first year a chapel, granary, tack room, and three other rooms had been constructed, using native labor. In 1788 two more rooms were added. In 1789 a second granary was built, quarters for the mayordomo, and quarters for the missionaries were built. Also, a covered passageway which temporarily served as a kitchen. Crops of wheat and beans were planted and limestone was mined at nearby Mori Point in quantities to provide for the food and construction needs of the parent mission. At its peak the asistencia consisted of a three-wing main structure surrounding a central plaza. Corn, peas, barley, asparagus, and rosemary would, in time also be cultivated, along with grape vineyards and groves of peach and quince trees. Due to a significant decline in the native population due to several infectious diseases including syphilis (Stanger 1963), the population dropped from 300 in 1790 to 25 in 1792 at which point the facility was closed and used mainly as an outpost to graze cattle after 1790.

A plaque in Sanchez Adobe Park depicts the former Asistencia's floor plan.

After secularization of the missions in 1834, Juan Alvarado, the Mexican Governor of California, granted the lands of the 8,926-acre (36.12 km^{2}) Rancho San Pedro to Francisco Sanchez in 1839. Included were all of the buildings of the Asistencia. Sanchez retained ownership of the property after California was ceded to the United States in 1848. In 1894, roof tiles were salvaged from the property and installed on the Southern Pacific Railroad depot located in Burlingame, California (the first permanent structure constructed in the Mission Revival Style). Today, little remains of the original installation.

== See also ==
- Mission San Francisco de Asís
- List of Spanish missions in California

37.58714°N 122.49365°W
