= Mission Dolores mural =

Mural in San Francisco, California

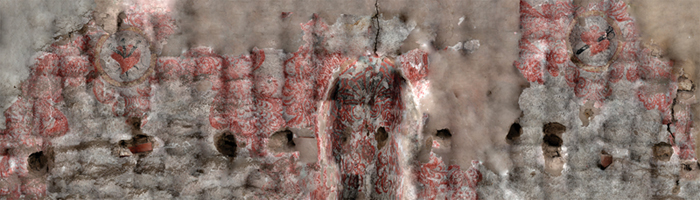
Stitched composite of more than 300 digital photographs showing the top 22 by 5 feet of the mural

The Mission Dolores mural is an 18th-century work of art in the Mission San Francisco de Asís, the oldest surviving structure in San Francisco. In 1791, the Ohlone people, Native Americans of the San Francisco Bay and laborers for the church, painted the mural on the focal wall of the sanctuary. Five years later, an altarpiece known as a reredos, was constructed in front of the mural, blocking it from view for more than two centuries. The mural remained mostly unseen in the intervening years, decaying slowly as it was protected from light and moisture behind the reredos enclosure.

In the 2000s, archaeologist Eric Blind and artist Ben Wood digitized the mural, allowing the public to view it for the first time. Painted on plaster, the mural is adorned with abstract patterns and Christian imagery, in ochre, white, red, yellow, black, and blue/grey colors. The mural is an historically significant work of art from the early era of Spanish missions in California (1769–1833), and is considered "the best-preserved example of art from the period of first contact with Europeans".

== Description ==
The construction of adobe walls for the mission church began in 1788 with the manufacture of 36,000 bricks by native laborers. By 1790 the walls were completed, plastered, and whitewashed. It is most likely between this time and the dedication of the church on August 2, 1791 that the mural was painted. The mural covers the entirety of the rear wall of the church, behind the historic wooden altar. It measures 22 by 20 feet and includes two statuary niches. It was eclipsed in the year 1796 by an impressive baroque-style relief sculpture shipped from San Blas, Mexico, called a reredos. A reredos is often wooden with niches and holds statues or paintings. This reredos continues to stand as the backdrop to the mission altar and has concealed the wall painting for over 200 years. For about five years before the mural was covered by the ornate wooden reredos, friars, soldiers, and native people saw the mural each day.

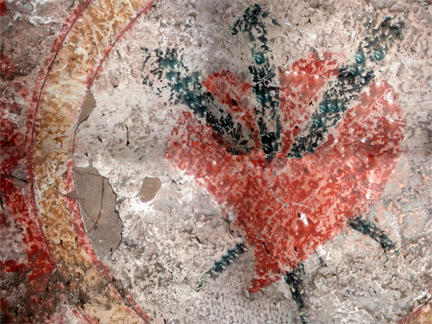
Detail of Sacred Heart pierced by three daggers

Part of the mural depicts the Sacred Hearts of Jesus and Mary. In Christian art, the Sacred Heart is often portrayed as a flaming heart shining with divine light, pierced by the lance-wound, surrounded by a crown of thorns, surmounted by a cross and bleeding. Sometimes the image is over Jesus' body with his wounded hands pointing at the heart. The wounds and crown of thorns allude to the manner of Jesus' death, while the fire represents the transformative power of love. In the Mission Dolores mural, the Sacred Heart appears on either side of the upper third of the mural, with a decorative recessed wall, or statuary niche, in the center, decorated at the top with a shell motif. The upper niche is richly ornamented with scroll motifs and flanked on either side with more scrolling decorative patterns. The interior of the lower niche is less decorative and painted in red. Similar ornamental motifs are found elsewhere in the old mission on the archway above the sanctuary, as well as chevron patterns on the ceiling. We know these are original native patterns as we see the same pattern in the original basketry woven by local native women over 200 years ago. According to the California Missions Foundation some of the design resembles traditional Ohlone patterns found on rock art in the region. In the mission church behind the huge canvas depicting the last supper there are also decorative patterns painted on the wall.

A defining factor in the preservation of the mural over the centuries is the mural's situation in a dark, cramped space behind the historic reredos. The mural is situated on a wall about two feet behind the reredos. It is only partially visible from an oblique angle through a trap door that opens from the attic above.

Certain areas of the mural have deteriorated over time, particularly a section at the top that has been severely abraded, possibly when an electrical cable was installed in front of the mural. The mural also provides evidence of an earlier period in the area's history. It remained in place for five years while missionaries working on the frontier sought to convert local native peoples to Catholicism and promote a Spanish colonial vision of civilization.

== Historical accounts ==
English captain and geographer George Vancouver was the first foreign visitor to sail into colonial San Francisco. He made two trips to San Francisco in 1792 and 1793. Vancouver's praising account of the church is one of the few remarks available from the brief period the mural was displayed.

... the church, which for its magnitude and architecture and internal decorations, did great credit to the constructors of it. ... the raising and decorating of this edifice appeared to have greatly attracted the attention of the Fathers, and the comforts they might have provided in their humble habitation, seemed to have been totally sacrificed to their accomplishment of this favorite object.

The first known visual record of any decoration at Mission Dolores was an illustration in 1816 by artist Louis Choris. Choris' watercolor painting, Dance of the California Indians at the Mission of San Francisco (1816) shows geometric patterns on the lower portion of the building's facade.

== Rediscovery and archaeology ==
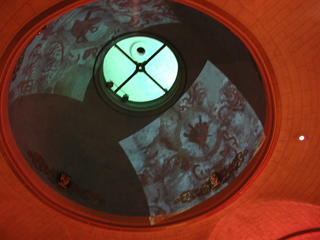
Photo of projection of Sacred Hearts onto basilica dome, January 23 to February 7, 2004

During work on the church's exterior walls in 1918, a policeman, Charles Fennell, discovered a frieze in the old sacristy: "Fennell, watching workmen engaged in buttressing the walls of the building, had his attention attracted by streaks of color flashing from pealing kalsomine on what was once the interior of the old sacristy ... one of the details looked like a horse shoe, and what resembled a hand or a running or gesticulating figure of man could also be discerned." According to the same article, "The old sacristy walls were preserved with a sheathing of wood by Father Prendergast away back in 1862." By 1918 the mural had already been covered for over 120 years.

On April 10, 1936, Historic American Buildings Survey (HABS) documentation was undertaken by photographer Robert Kerrigan, who recorded black and white photographs of the central niche. From those photographs the central niche appears to be unchanged in condition since that time. The mission church, the mural, and the hatch opening to it are documented in architectural drawings. Detailed drawings of the sanctuary interior show painted ornament on the north and south walls, of which one design clearly resembles the images of hearts found behind the reredos. This design painted in red on natural white plaster is obviously a rooster, with intricately painted feathers and a heart in the center. The rooster is a Christian symbol of the resurrection of Jesus.

During the late 1980s, Norman Neuerburg, a noted mission historian, crawled behind the altar in the cramped space to draw a sketch of the mural.

In the 2000s, archaeologist Eric Blind and artist Ben Wood of the Mission Dolores Digital Mural Project captured the first photographs of the mural, keeping the 1796 reredos intact. Digital images were displayed to the public in a projection display onto the interior dome of the Mission Dolores basilica. The Office of Historic Preservation of the California Department of Parks and Recreation awarded Blind and Wood the California Governor's Historic Preservation Award for their work preserving the mural. In February 2007, Blind presented the professional paper, "Visualizing Past Places: The Mission Dolores Mural", at the California Mission Studies Association annual meeting. In 2018, Ben Wood, wrote a paper titled, "California's Hidden Sacred Mural: The History of the Painted Adobe Reredos at Mission Dolores", in collaboration with Jonathan Cordero, Chairperson of the Association of Ramaytush Ohlone.

It is thought that separating the back altar from the mural would be a very complicated and costly process.

== Recreation ==
The 18th century Mission Dolores Mural is recreated on the exterior of the Mission Market on Bartlett Street in San Francisco

In early 2011, a fundraising campaign was initiated to support a recreation of the mural in San Francisco's Mission District. Four artists completed the mural, and on April 14, 2011 it was unveiled on San Francisco's Bartlett Street as part of the Mission Community Market. This mural was later destroyed when the building it was painted on was destroyed by a fire on January 28, 2015.

== Conservation ==
In 2016 a proposal was submitted to parish administrators for conservation professionals to develop feasibility estimates for further photographic documentation and conservation attention.

As of 2026, Mission Dolores has submitted detailed plans to the San Francisco Planning commission to bring the reredos forward approximately eight feet to create a space for the conservation and interpretation of the original mural.

== See also ==
- California mission clash of cultures

== Further reading and resources ==
- Boxer, Barbara (2004-01-29). "Boxer Announces Senate Hearing On Missions Bill". boxer.senate.gov. Archived from the original on 2010-10-10. "Each day we are finding new hidden gems in these missions. Recently, archaeologists discovered magnificent Native American murals in San Francisco's Mission Dolores that have been hidden for more than 200 years. These treasures might be lost to us forever if we fail to preserve the California Missions."
- Times Wire Reports (Jan 2004). "Murals From 1791 are Found at Mission". Los Angeles Times.
- Wood, Ben (Jan 2008). "Composite of 5ft by 22ft section of the Mission Dolores Mural 2004". benwood.net. Archived from the original on 2011-07-23.
- Reckoning with meaning:the hidden mural of Mission Dolores (2005) Memorias: Balances y Perspectivas de la Antropología e Historia de Baja California (2005)
- Journal of the West (Fall 2018) California's Hidden Sacred Mural: The History of the Painted Adobe Reredos at Mission Dolores, Journal of the West, Fall 2018 issue, Vol. 57, No.4
