= Rancho San Pedro (Sánchez) =

Mexican land grant in San Mateo County, California

Coordinates: 37.630°N 122.470°W

Rancho San Pedro was a 8,926-acre (36.12 km^{2}) Mexican land grant in present-day San Mateo County, California, given in 1839 by Governor Juan Alvarado to Francisco Sanchez. The grant encompasses present-day Pacifica.

== History ==
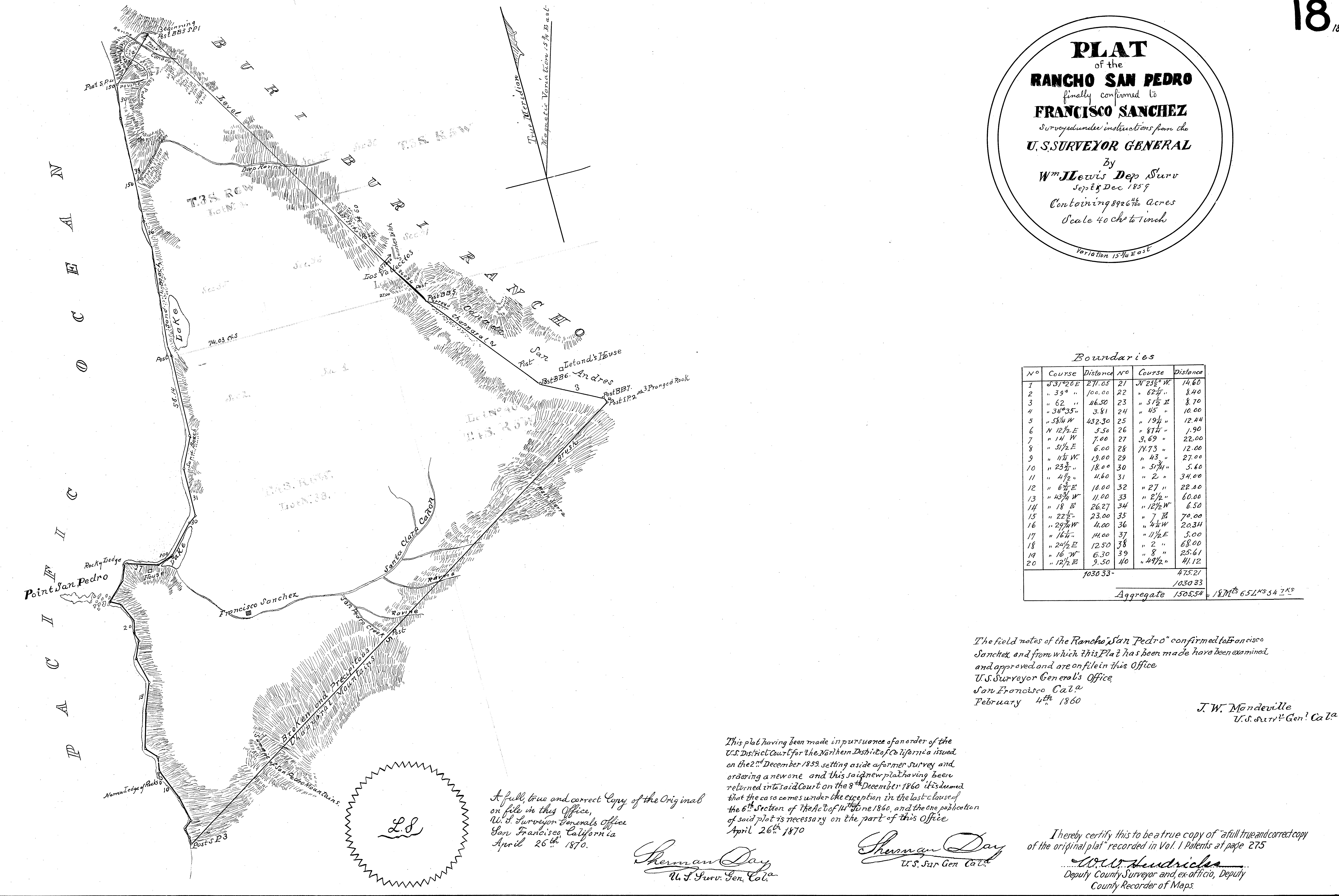
Rancho plat of 1859

The two square league grant was made to Francisco Sánchez (1805–1862), Commandante of the San Francisco Presidio and eighth alcade of the City of San Francisco after the Mexican secularization act of 1833.

With the cession of California to the United States following the Mexican-American War, the 1848 Treaty of Guadalupe Hidalgo provided that the land grants would be honored. As required by the Land Act of 1851, a claim for Rancho San Pedro was filed with the Public Land Commission in 1852, and the grant was patented to Francisco Sánchez in 1870.

When Sanchez died in 1862, the rancho was still intact, and his widow Theodora Higuera de Sanchez leased it to Francis Sievers. In 1871, the rancho was sold to James Regan (and Richard and Robert Tobin of Hibernia Bank) to pay debts.

== Historic sites of the Rancho ==
- Sánchez Adobe Park. 1842 adobe residence.
- San Pedro y San Pablo Asistencia
- Rockaway Quarry. Limestone mined from here to make whitewash for the Sánchez Adobe.
