= William Sturgis Hinckley =

American politician (1806–1846)

9th Alcalde of San Francisco
- In office 1845–1846
- Preceded by: Francisco Sánchez
- Succeeded by: Juan Nepomuceno Padilla

Personal details
- Born: 1806
- Died: 1846 (aged 39–40) San Francisco, California
- Spouse: Susana Martínez

William Sturgis Hinckley (1806–1846) was an American politician. He was the 9th Alcalde of San Francisco (then known as Yerba Buena) in California.

== Life ==
He was born in Hingham, Massachusetts, and was a nephew of William F. Sturgis, a Boston merchant.

In the 1830s he was owner and captain of ships plying the California hide trade with the Hawaiian Islands. After his first wife died in Massachusetts in 1840, he became a permanent resident of Yerba Buena, taking Mexican citizenship in 1842 and marrying Ygnacio Martínez's daughter Susana. He enjoyed a close friendship with Juan Bautista Alvarado, and helped him in his efforts to secure the governorship of Alta California against a competing claim from Carlos Antonio Carrillo.

He was elected alcalde in 1844, and in that year ordered the construction of a bridge across the creek between San Francisco Bay and a small saltwater lagoon lying at what is now the intersection of Montgomery and Jackson Streets. This modest construction was regarded as a novelty by many residents at the time, who had formerly had to wade tidal muds or jump across the creek to travel between the settled area to the south and ship embarkments to the north.

His term as alcalde ended January 1, 1846, and he died in June of that year.
