= José de la Cruz Sánchez =

American politician (1799–1878)

11th Alcalde of San Francisco
- In office 1845–1846
- Preceded by: Juan Nepomuceno Padilla
- Succeeded by: José de Jesús Noé

Personal details
- Born: November 8, 1799 Santa Clara, Las Californias, New Spain
- Died: 20 September 1878 (aged 79)
- Resting place: Saint John's Cemetery, San Mateo County, California, U.S.
- Spouse: Josefa Ramona Eduarda Mercado y Sal

José de la Cruz Sánchez (November 8, 1799 – 1878) was a Californio statesman and ranchero who served as the eleventh Alcalde of San Francisco.

== Life ==
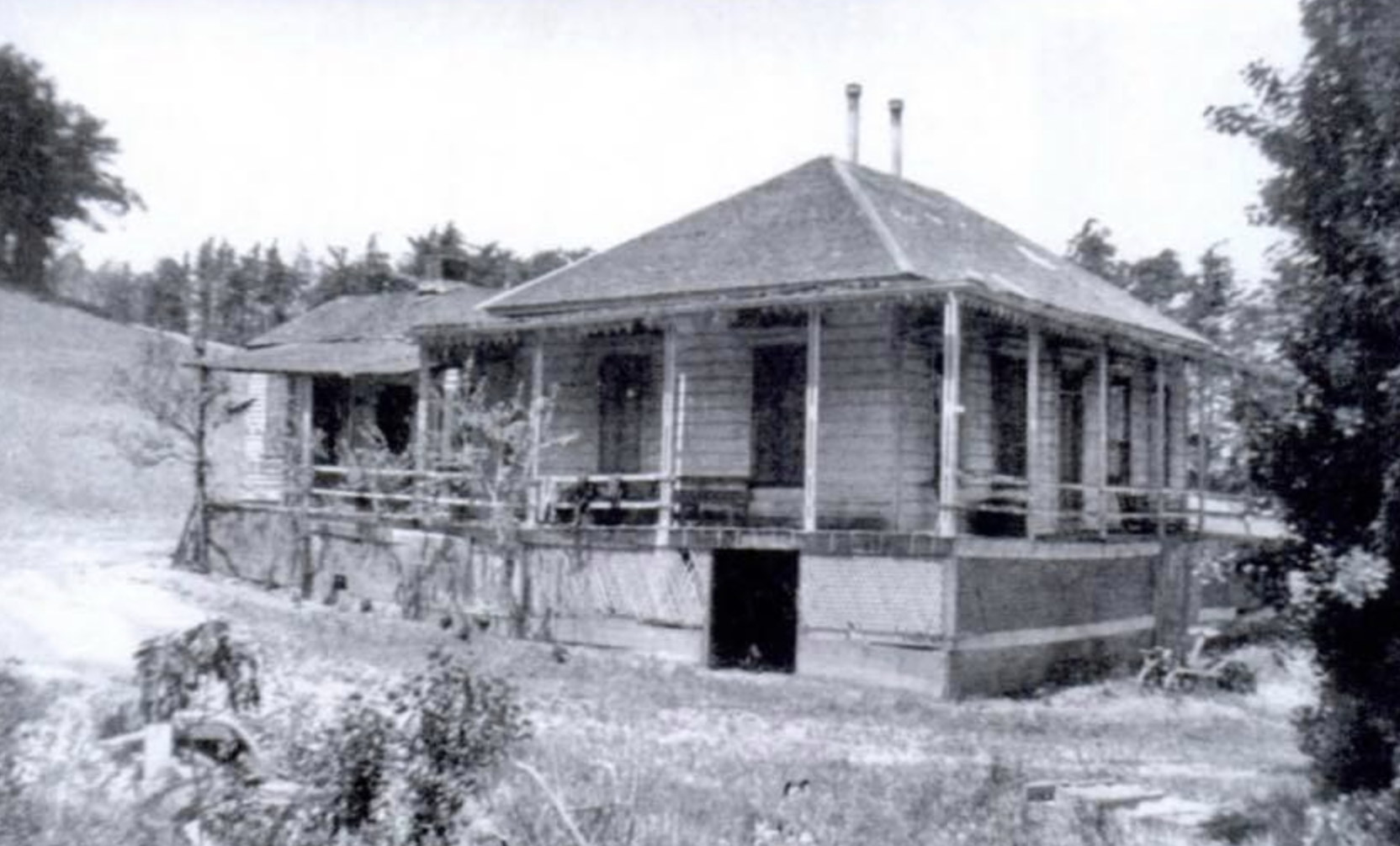
Home built by José de la Cruz Sánchez for his family, where they lived for two generations, located in present-day Millbrae, California (image from the 1920s, after the home was abandoned).

José de la Cruz Sánchez was born on November 8, 1799, in Santa Clara, California. He was the eldest son of Ana Josefa Soto and José Antonio Sánchez (1773–1843), a land grantee of Rancho Buri Buri (also called Sánchez Rancho) in present-day San Mateo County. Rancho Buri Buri extended between the north line of South San Francisco and the middle of Burlingame, and from the San Francisco Bay to the top of the Peninsula ridge and included present-day Lomita Park, Millbrae, South San Francisco, San Bruno, and the northern part of Burlingame.

José de la Cruz married Josefa Ramona Eduarda Mercado y Sal and together they had eight children. José de la Cruz Sánchez's brother, Francisco Sanchez, was also an alcalde of San Francisco.

== Sánchez family of California ==
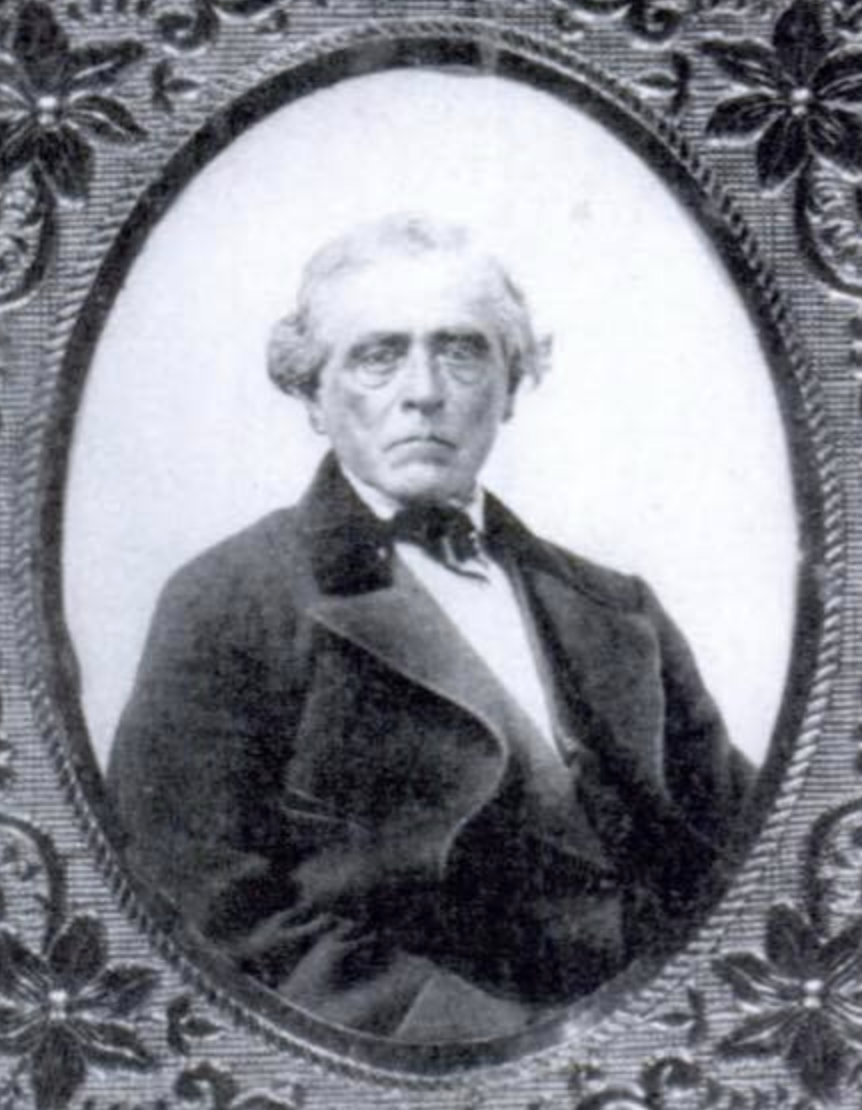
Jose Antonio Sanchez (1773–1843), father of José de la Cruz Sánchez

José de la Cruz Sánchez's father Jose Antonio Sanchez (1773–1843), was born in Sinaloa, Mexico and came to California with his father also named Jose Antonio Sanchez (1751–1805), with the De Anza Expedition of 1776. He became a soldier at the San Francisco Presidio. Rancho Buri Buri was provisionally given to him by the Mexican government in 1827. He retired from active service in 1836 and died in 1843. He is buried at Mission Dolores cemetery in San Francisco.

José de la Cruz Sánchez's four brothers were Francisco Sanchez, Manuel Sánchez, Jose Ysidro (Chino) Sánchez and Ysidro Sánchez. José de la Cruz Sánchez's five sisters were married to Francisco De Haro (Emiliana Sanchez), Candelario Valencia (Paula Sánchez), a Valencia, Leonardo Feliz and John Reed (Hilaria Sanchez).

== See also ==
- Darius Ogden Mills
