= Francisco Sánchez (American politician) =

American politician

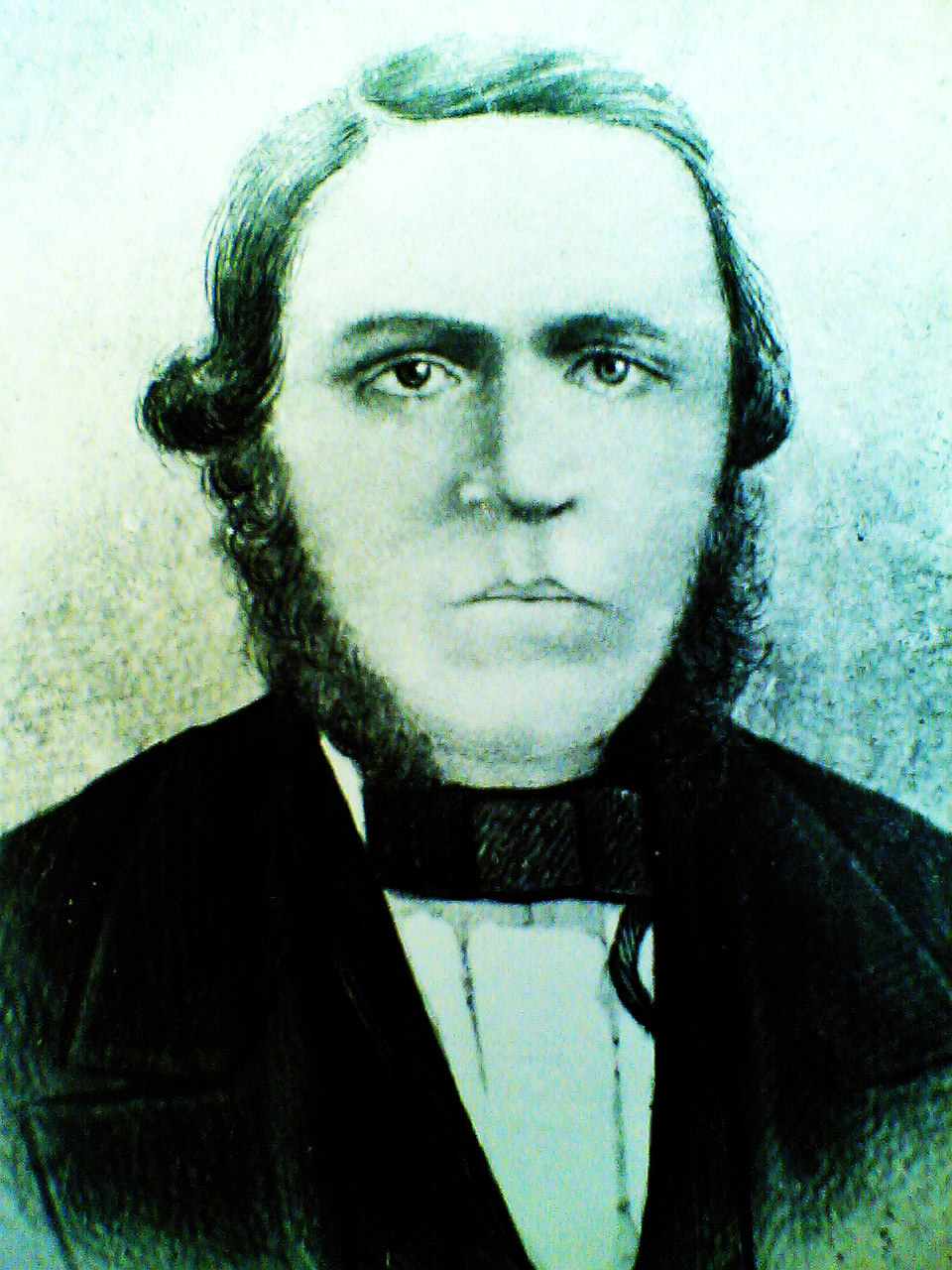

8th Alcalde of San Francisco
- In office 1845–1846
- Preceded by: José de Jesús Noé
- Succeeded by: William Sturgis Hinckley

Personal details
- Born: April 11, 1805 San Jose, California
- Died: September 8, 1862 (aged 57) San Francisco, California
- Resting place: Mission Dolores
- Spouse: Maria Teodora Higuera

Francisco María Sánchez (April 11, 1805 – September 8, 1862) was a Californio politician, military officer, and ranchero who served as 8th Alcalde of San Francisco and Commandant of the Presidio of San Francisco.

Sánchez was the grantee of the 8,926-acre Rancho San Pedro and built the Sánchez Adobe in Pacifica. He was brother to José de la Cruz Sánchez, who served as 11th Alcalde of San Francisco.

== Life ==
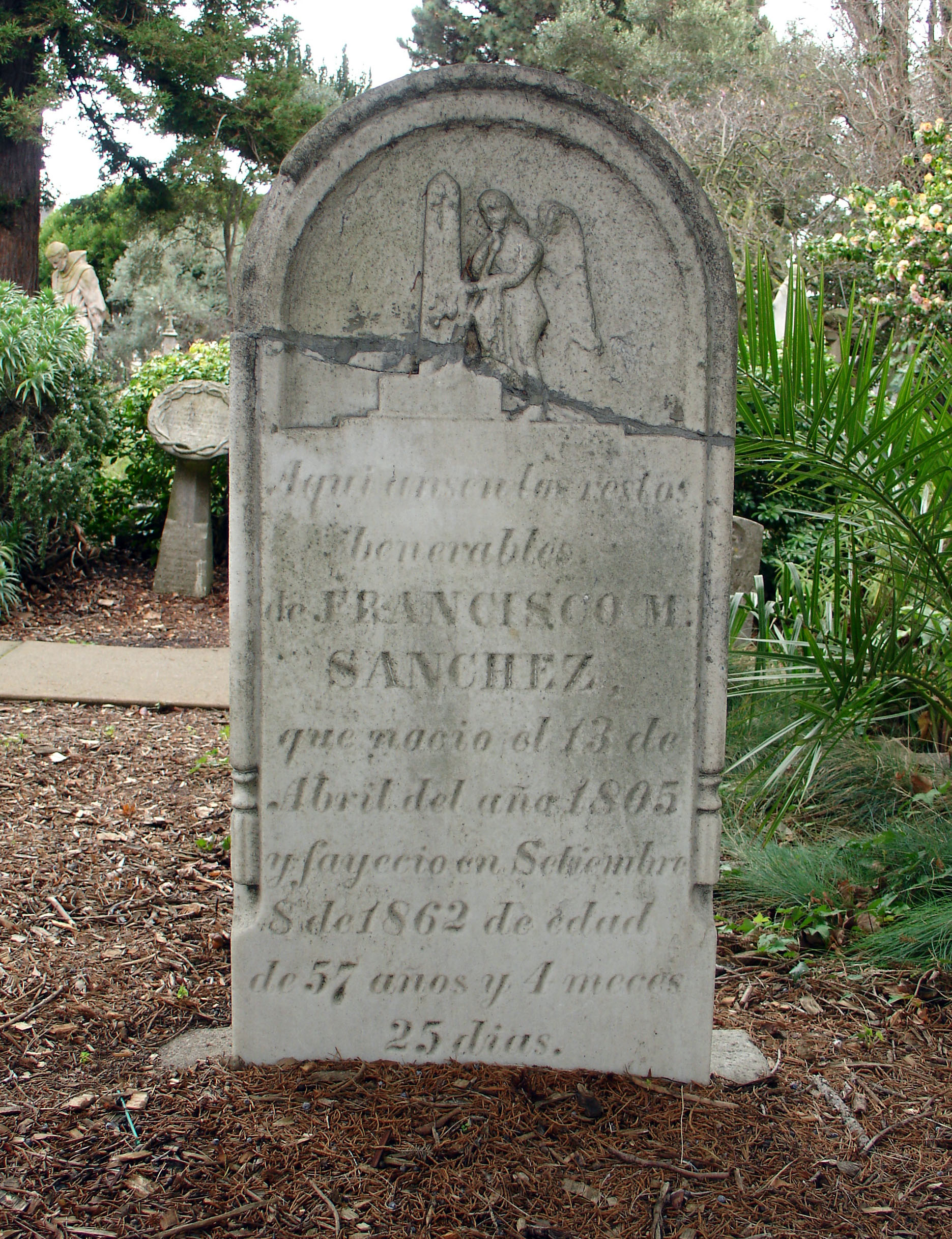
Grave at the Mission Dolores Cemetery in San Francisco.

Francisco Sánchez was born in San Jose, California and was the son of Ana Josefa Soto and José Antonio Sánchez (1773–1843), grantee of Rancho Buri Buri. Francisco's brother, José de la Cruz Sánchez, was also an alcalde of San Francisco.

He married Maria Teodora Higuera and they had ten children.

During 1842 to 1846, Sánchez established the Sánchez Adobe in what is now Pacifica, California.

He also served as the leader of the failed Mexican military response to the June 14, 1846 California Republic insurrection which established United States control of Mexican California. Sánchez is buried at the Mission Dolores in San Francisco.
