= Mission San Francisco de Asís =

18th-century Spanish mission in California

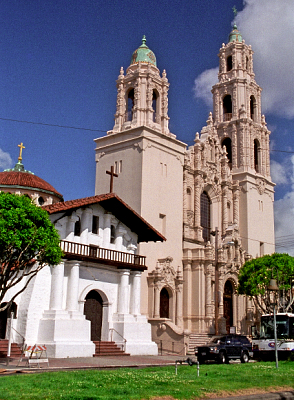
- Mission Dolores adobe chapel (left) and Mission Dolores Basilica

- Location in Central San Francisco Mission San Francisco de Asís (California) Mission San Francisco de Asís (the United States)
- Location: 320 Dolores Street; San Francisco, California 94114
- Coordinates: 37°45′51.8″N 122°25′37.3″W
- Name as founded: La Misión de Nuestro Padre San Francisco de Asís
- English translation: The Mission of Our Father Saint Francis of Assisi
- Patron: Saint Francis of Assisi
- Nickname: "Mission Dolores"
- Founded by: Francisco Palóu; Junípero Serra
- Founding Order: Sixth
- Military district: Fourth
- Native tribe: Ohlone; Costeño
- Native place name: Chutchui
- Baptisms: 6,898
- Marriages: 2,043
- Burials: 11,000= 5,000 (Europeans/Americans), 6,000 (Indians)
- Secularized: 1834
- Returned to the Church: 1857
- Governing body: Roman Catholic Archdiocese of San Francisco
- Current use: Parish Church

U.S. National Register of Historic Places
- Designated: 1972
- Reference no.: #72000251

California Historical Landmark
- Official name: Site of original Mission Dolores chapel and Dolores Lagoon
- Reference no.: 327-1

San Francisco Designated Landmark
- Designated: April 11, 1968
- Reference no.: 1

Website
- http://www.missiondolores.org

The Mission San Francisco de Asís (Spanish: Misión San Francisco de Asís), also known as Mission Dolores, is a historic Catholic church complex in San Francisco, California. Operated by the Archdiocese of San Francisco, the complex was founded in the 18th century by Spanish Catholic missionaries. The mission contains two historic buildings:

- The Mission Dolores adobe chapel was completed on August 2, 1791, making it the oldest intact structure in San Francisco.
- The Mission Dolores Basilica was constructed in 1918. It was designated a minor basilica by Pope Pius XII in 1952.

Located in the Mission District, the mission was founded on October 9, 1776, by Frs Francisco Palóu and Pedro Benito Cambón. The mission later relocated to its current site in 1783. The Franciscan Order sent the two priests to the then Spanish Province of Alta California to bring in Spanish settlers and evangelize the indigenous Ohlone people. The Ohlone provided most of the labor which built the adobe chapel. The early 20th-century Mission Dolores Basilica replaced a brick parish church built in 1876 that was destroyed in the San Francisco earthquake of 1906.

== History ==
=== 1700 to 1800 ===
The site of the future Mission San Francisco was scouted by the Spanish missionary Pedro Font in March 1776 during a visit to the Bay Area by the Spanish explorer Juan Bautista de Anza. The Spanish missionaries named the new mission San Francisco de Asís, in honor of Francis of Assisi, founder of the Franciscan Order. It became commonly known as Mission Dolores, after the nearby creek and water source, Arroyo de Nuestra Señora de los Dolores (Our Lady of Sorrows Creek)

On October 9, 1776, the missionaries dedicated a small chapel in present-day San Francisco as the Mission San Francisco. According to some sources, the chapel stood near the present intersection of Camp and Albion Streets. Members of the local Ramaytush Ohlone tribe are recorded as entering the mission in 1785. They would later provide the labor to build the new mission church.

The construction of adobe walls for the Mission Dolores church began in 1788, with the Ohlone laborers manufacturing 36,000 bricks. By 1790, the walls were completed, plastered, and whitewashed.The missionary Junípero Serra is recorded as having celebrated a mass at the chapel while it was still under construction.

The Mission Dolores adobe church was finished in 1791. The new church had adobe walls that were four feet thick. The roof beams were redwood and the ceiling displayed traditional Ohlone designs, painted in vegetable dyes. The mission complex at this time included a convent and facilities for agriculture and manufacturing.

=== 1800 to 1848 ===
The early 19th century saw the greatest period of activity at Mission San Francisco:

At its peak in 1810–1820, the average Indian population at Pueblo Dolores was about 1,100 people. In 1810 the Mission owned 11,000 sheep, 11,000 cows, and thousands of horses, goats, pigs, and mules. Its ranching and farming operations extended as far south as San Mateo and east to Alameda. Horses were corralled on Potrero Hill, and the milking sheds for the cows were located along Dolores Creek at what is today Mission High School. Twenty looms were kept in operation to process wool into cloth. The circumference of the Mission's holdings was said to have been about 125 miles.

Records in the early 19th century recorded some indigenous peoples being baptized or living at the mission. On March 2, 1811, seventeen Miwok-speaking people from the Omiomi tribelet were baptized at the mission. Between 1806 and 1816, 30 indigenous girls, between the ages of nine and nineteen years old, who were known as "monjas" (nuns) were recorded as dying at the mission. However, they were more likely to be living in the monjerío, the dormitory for single women, rather than being nuns who had taken vows.

In 1817, the Franciscans established the Mission San Rafael Arcángel in San Rafael, California as an asistencia to act as a hospital for the Mission San Francisco de Asís. San Rafael became an independent mission in 1822.

With the end of the Mexican War of Independence in 1821, the newly independent Mexico took control of Alta California. Relations were strained between the new Mexican Government and the Franciscan overseers of the California missions. Supplies were scarce and over 5,000 Native Americans had died from disease and other causes at the Mission San Francisco. The Mexican Government decided to free the Native Americans who were under mission guardianship and give them mission lands.

New regulations under the Mexican Secularization Act of 1833 forced the missions in 1834 to start selling their vast commercial properties. In practical terms, this meant that each mission could only own its church, its priests residence and small plots of land surrounding the church for gardens. The Mission San Francisco sold most of its property in 1836. By 1842, only eight Native Americans were still residing there.

=== 1848 to 1900 ===
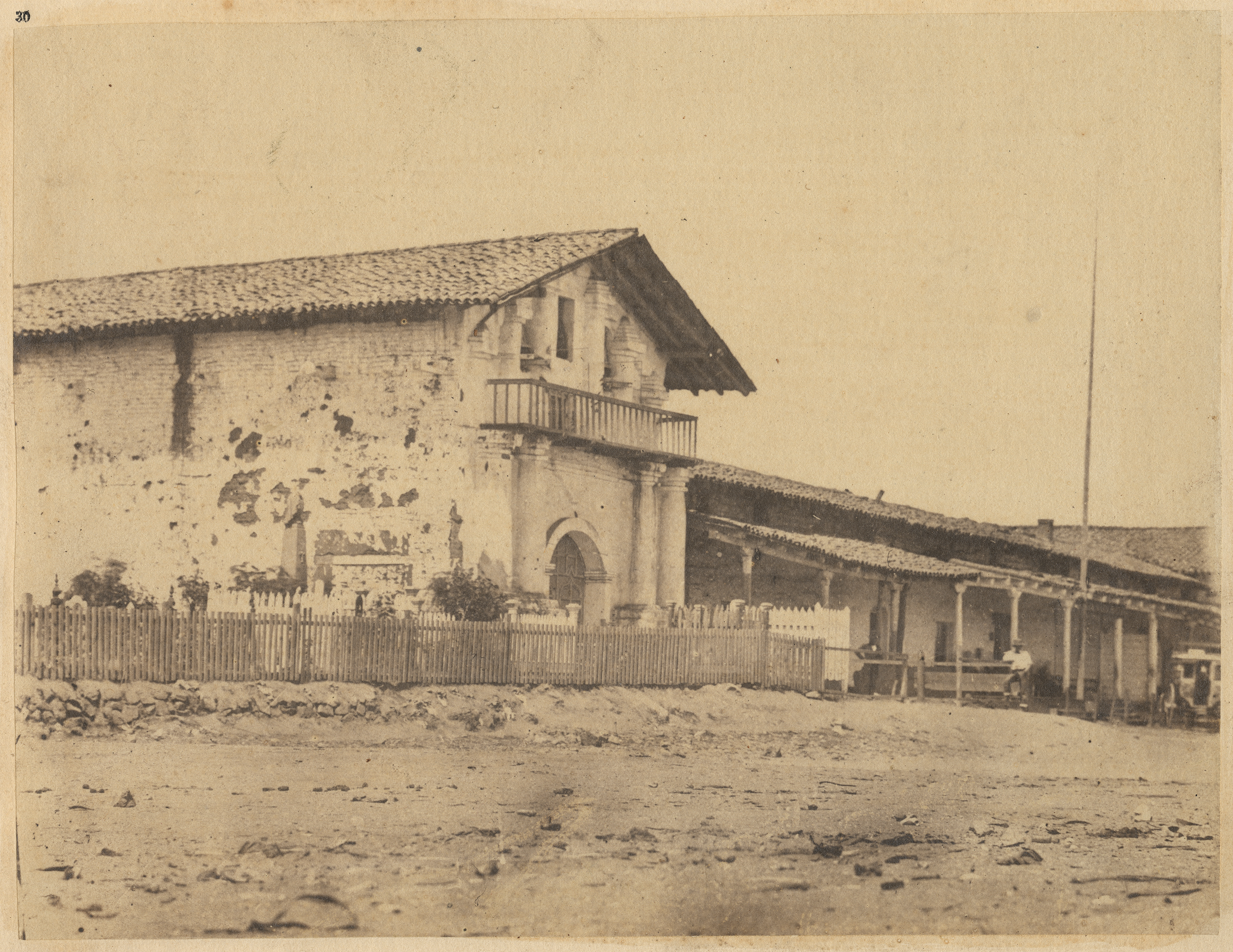
Mission Dolores adobe chapel (1856)

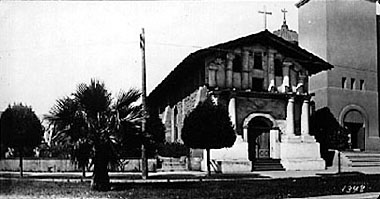
Mission Dolores adobe chapel c. 1910. The 1876 brick church, severely damaged in the 1906 earthquake, is partially visible.

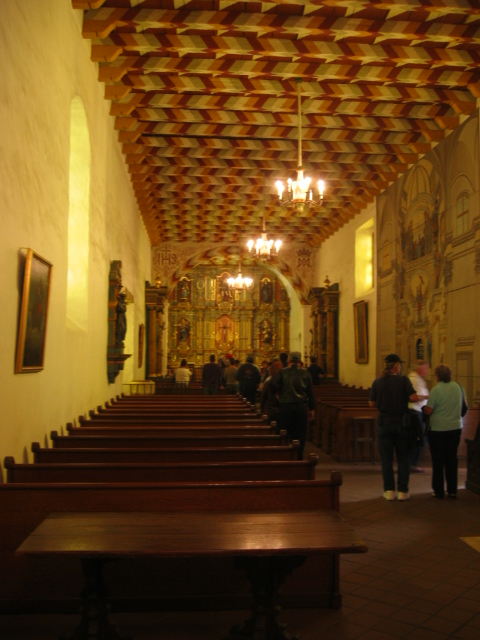
Mission Dolores adobe chapel (2007)

After the Mexican-American War ended in 1848, the Mission San Francisco and the rest of Alta California became part of the United States. With the end of Mexican authority, the rules governing the California missions became defunct.

In 1848, the California Gold Rush brought a surge of American immigrants and commercial activity to the San Francisco area. In the 1850s, the city constructed two plank roads from the downtown area to the Mission District. The area soon became a popular resort and entertainment center. The Franciscans sold or leased some of the remaining mission land to developers who built saloons and gambling halls. By 1857, the Franciscans had turned control of the Mission San Francisco to the Archdiocese of San Francisco.

During the late 19th century, the archdiocese converted part of the old convent into a two-story wooden wing for use as a seminary and priests' residence. The rest of the convent building became the Mansion House, a tavern. By 1876, the archdiocese had razed the Mansion House, replacing it with a large Gothic Revival brick church to accommodate more congregants than the adobe church

The archdiocese also covered the adobe church with clapboard siding for both cosmetic and protective reasons. The siding was removed in a later renovation.

=== 1900 to the present ===
The 1906 San Francisco earthquake destroyed the bricks of the church, damaging the adobe building. To prevent the huge fire sparked by the earthquake from engulfing the two buildings, firefighters blew up the convent and School of Notre Dame building across the street. In 1913, the archdiocese began constructing the Mission Dolores Church to replace the destroyed brick church. The architect Willis Polk restored the adobe building in 1917.

The construction of the new Mission Dolores Church experienced delays due to the American entry into World War I in 1917. It was finally completed in 1918. The church was remodeled in 1926, with the archdiocese adding churrigueresque ornamentation. These were inspired by exhibits at the 1915 Panama–California Exposition in San Diego, California.

In 1952, Archbishop John J. Mitty announced that Pope Pius XII had elevated Mission Dolores to the status of a minor basilica. It became the first minor basilica west of the Mississippi River and the fifth one in the United States.

Today, the church constructed in 1918 is referred to as the Mission Dolores Basilica while the 1791 adobe chapel is called the Mission Dolores. The mission complex also includes the historic Cemetery and Gardens of Mission Dolores. The gardens includes native plants, which would have been found in the 1791 period, as well as a rose garden that was gifted and is maintained by the Golden Gate Rose Society. There is also an Ohlone Indian ethno-botanic garden.

=== Other historic designations ===
- San Francisco Designated Landmark #1 – City and County of San Francisco
- California Historical Landmark #327-1 – site of original Mission Dolores chapel and Dolores Lagoon
- California Historical Landmark #393 – "The Hospice," an outpost of Mission Dolores founded in 1800 in San Mateo, California
- California Historical Landmark #784 – El Camino Real (the northernmost point visited by Serra)

== Cemetery ==
The mission holds the San Francisco de Asís cemetery, which is the oldest cemetery in San Francisco. Grave markers date between 1830 and 1898. The cemetery has the unmarked graves of about 5,000 indigenous peoples of California, including Ohlone and Miwok people. Other people buried there include Luis Antonio Argüello, Lieutenant Moraga (the first commandment of the Presidio), Don Francisco de Haro, William Leidesdorf, and victims of the San Francisco Committee of Vigilance.

== Art ==
=== Mission Dolores Mural ===
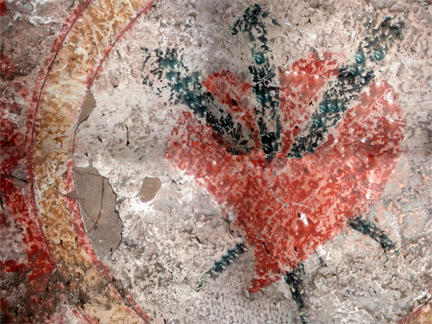
Sacred Heart of Jesus depicted in Mission Dolores mural (2010)

The Mission Dolores adobe chapel contains the Mission Dolores mural, painted in 1791 by Ohlone artists. The mural covers the entire rear wall of the building, behind the historic wooden altar. It measures 22 by 20 feet and includes two statuary niches. In 1796, the Franciscans installed a baroque-style relief sculpture called a reredos in front of the mural. In later years, the mural was covered up with wooden boarding. The mural was rediscovered during a renovation in 1910.

Part of the mural depicts the Sacred Hearts of Jesus and Mary. The mural also contains the image of a rooster, a Christian symbol of the resurrection of Jesus.

=== Junípero Serra statue ===
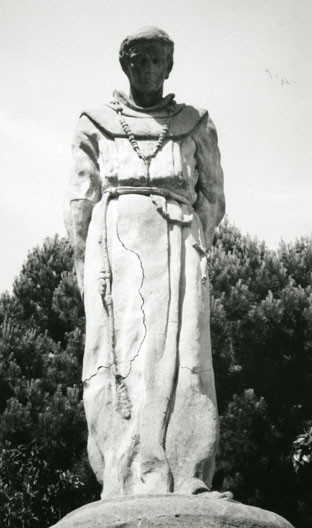
Junipero Serra statue on the mission grounds (2012)

The Junípero Serra statue is located on the grounds of the Mission San Francisco complex. The cast stone sculpture was designed by the American artist Arthur Putnam and completed in 1909. It was cast between 1916 and 1917, and installed in 1918 when the mission was remodeled.

Funding for the sculpture came from D.J. McQuarry and it cost $500 to cast. It is approximately 6 ft 6 in tall. The sculpture depicts Serra wearing a Franciscan friar's robe belted at the waist with a knotted rope and a rosary around his neck. The sculpture is on a concrete base. It is one of a series of allegorical figures commissioned by the estate of E. W. Scripps to depict California history. In 1993 it was examined by the Smithsonian Institution's Save Outdoor Sculpture! program. The program determined that the sculpture was well-maintained.

=== Francis of Assisi stained glass window ===
The Mission Dolores Basilica contains a stained glass window of Francis of Assisi, created by the German artist Franz Xaver Zettler at the time of the church's construction.

== Succession of rectors, pastors, and administrators ==
- Francisco Palóu and Pedro Benito Cambón – June 27, 1776 (founders)
- Francisco Palóu – 1776 to 1784
- Eugene O'Connell – 1854
- Richard Carroll – 1854 to 1860
- John J. Prendergast – 1860 to 1867
- Thomas Cushing – 1867 to 1875
- Richard P. Brennan – 1875 to 1904
- Patrick Cummins – 1904 to 1916
- John W. Sullivan – 1916 to 1939
- Thomas A. Connolly – 1939 to 1948 (first auxiliary bishop, first rector)
- James T. O'Dowd – 1948 to 1950 (rector)
- Merlin Guilfoyle – 1950 to 1969 (rector)
- Norman F. McFarland – 1970 to 1974 (last rector)
- Richard S. Knapp – 1974, 1974 to 1983 (served first as administrator, then pastor)
- John J. O'Connor – 1983 to 1997
- Maurice McCormick – 1997 to 2003
- William J. Justice – 2003 to 2007 (Became a bishop after he left Mission Dolores)
- Arturo Albano – 2007 to 2015
- Francis Mark P Garbo – 2015 to present

== See also ==
- Spanish missions in California
- List of Spanish missions in California
- San Pedro y San Pablo Asistencia
- List of San Francisco Designated Landmarks
- USNS Mission Dolores (AO-115) – a Mission Buenaventura Class fleet oiler built during World War II.
- USNS Mission San Francisco (AO-123) – a Mission Buenaventura Class fleet oiler built during World War II.
- Mission Dolores Outpost
