= Jefferson Union High School District =

School district in California, United States

Address
- 123 Edgemont Drive, Building A Daly City, San Mateo County, California, 94015
- Coordinates: 37.668096°N 122.478551°W

District information
- Motto: Excellence Through Equity
- Grades: 9–12, Adult ED
- Established: 1922
- Superintendent: Toni Presta
- Deputy superintendent(s): Deputy Superintendent Kareen Baca; Deputy Superintendent Tina Van Raaphorst; Associate Superintendent Dorene Basuino
- School board: Sherrett Walker, Andrew Lie, Rosie Tejada, Martinien Cho
- Chair of the board: Jerome Gallegos
- Governing agency: San Mateo County Office of Education
- Schools: Jefferson, Westmoor, Thornton, Oceana, Terra Nova, and Adult ED
- NCES District ID: 0618930
- District ID: 41-68924

Students and staff
- Enrollment: 3,715 (2024-2025)
- Athletic conference: Peninsula Athletic League

Other information
- Website: www.juhsd.net

The Jefferson Union High School District (JUHSD) is a high school district in northern San Mateo County, California, which serves the cities of Daly City, Brisbane and Pacifica, the town of Colma, the CDP of Broadmoor and a section of San Bruno. Its district office is located at the new location of 123 Edgemont Drive, Bldg. A, Daly City. It serves as a secondary education district for students coming from the Jefferson Elementary School District, Bayshore Elementary School District, Brisbane School District, and the Pacifica School District.

== History ==
The Jefferson Union High School District was formed by voters in a March 1922 election, and the first Jefferson High School opened on August 21, 1922, at an old school house on Alemán at the corner of Hill and Market. Voters approved a bond of $180,000 in November 1922 for a new high school building, which was dedicated on May 23, 1925. That building was later demolished in the early 1960s after the opening of the current Jefferson High School building in 1963.

== Schools ==
It consists of four comprehensive high schools, and one continuation school:

Jefferson Union High School District Schools
Name	Established	Enrollment (Note: 2016–17 data from DataQuest)	Mascot	City	Notes	Image
Jefferson	1922	1,107	Grizzlies	Daly City	Current building built in 1963, refurbished 2005	
Oceana	1962	597	Sharks	Pacifica	Main building designed by Mario Ciampi; nontraditional school with emphasis on liberal arts education	
Terra Nova	1961	982	Tigers	Pacifica		
Thornton	1975	136	Saints	Daly City	Continuation high school	
Westmoor	1958	1,598	Rams	Daly City	Campus designed by Mario Ciampi and Lawrence Halprin	
Summary		4,862				

=== Former Schools ===
The now closed Serramonte High School was open from 1970 to 1981, returning in a limited form for the two academic years of 1993–1995. At the time, it was proposed to relocate Oceana to the Serramonte campus to save money to restore a state-mandated $750,000 reserve fund for the district. The former campus, now renamed Serramonte Del Rey, serves as the district office.

== Teacher housing ==
In 2018, district voters passed a bond that allowed the district to build housing for teaching staff. Around 2020, construction began. The facility has 122 apartments.

== Enrollment ==
According to the California Department of Education, the total enrollment for Jefferson Union High School District is 4,862 in the 2016–17 academic year.
