= BESD =

BESD may refer to:

- Balsz Elementary School District, Phoenix, Arizona, United States
- Bayshore Elementary School District, San Mateo County, California, United States
- Box Elder School District, Box Elder County, Utah, United States
- Brawley Elementary School District, Brawley, California, United States
- Burlington-Edison School District, Skagit County, Washington, United States
