= Milagra Ridge =

Park near San Francisco, California

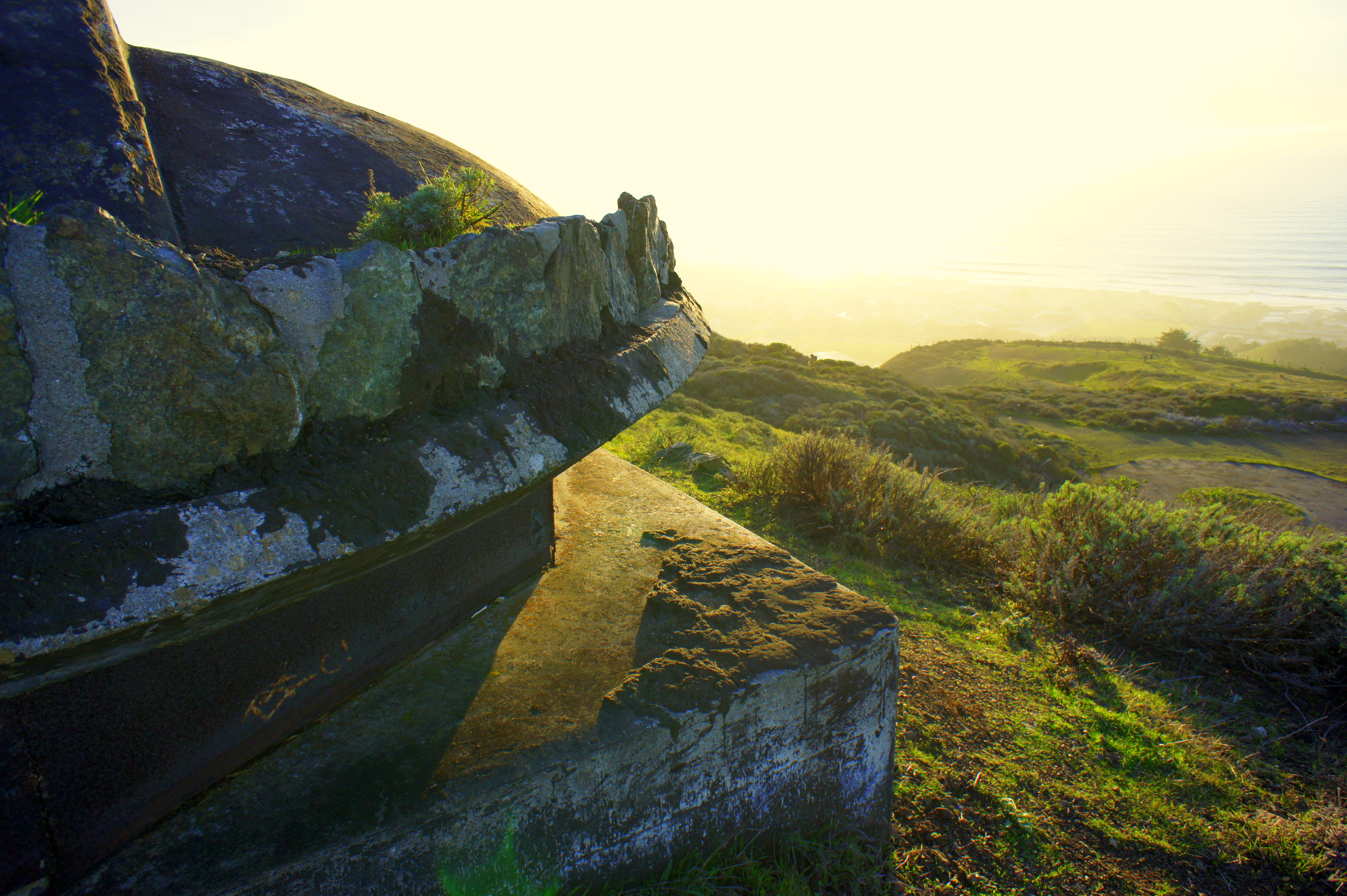
- Ruins of Battery 244 overlooking Pacifica at Milagra Ridge

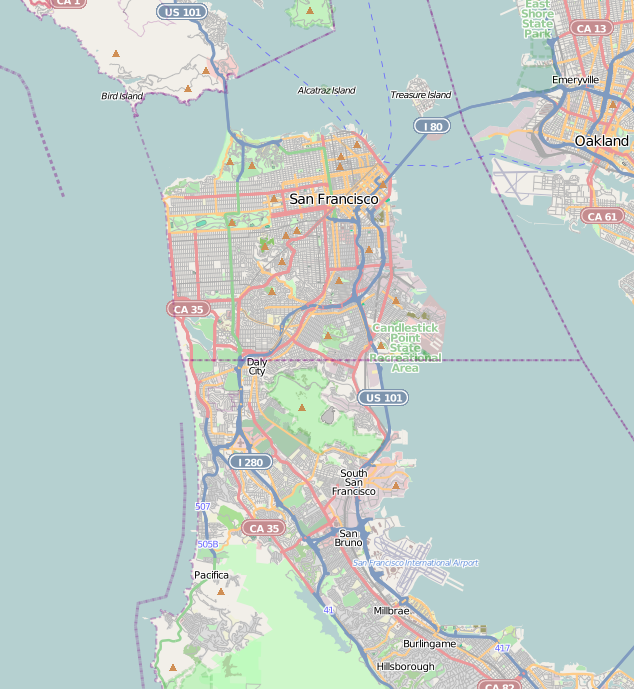
- Location within San Francisco Location within California Location within the United States
- Nearest city: between Daly City and Pacifica
- Coordinates: 37°38′21″N 122°28′45″W
- Area: 275 acres (111 ha)
- Created: 1987
- Operator: National Park Service
- Website: www.nps.gov/goga/miri.htm
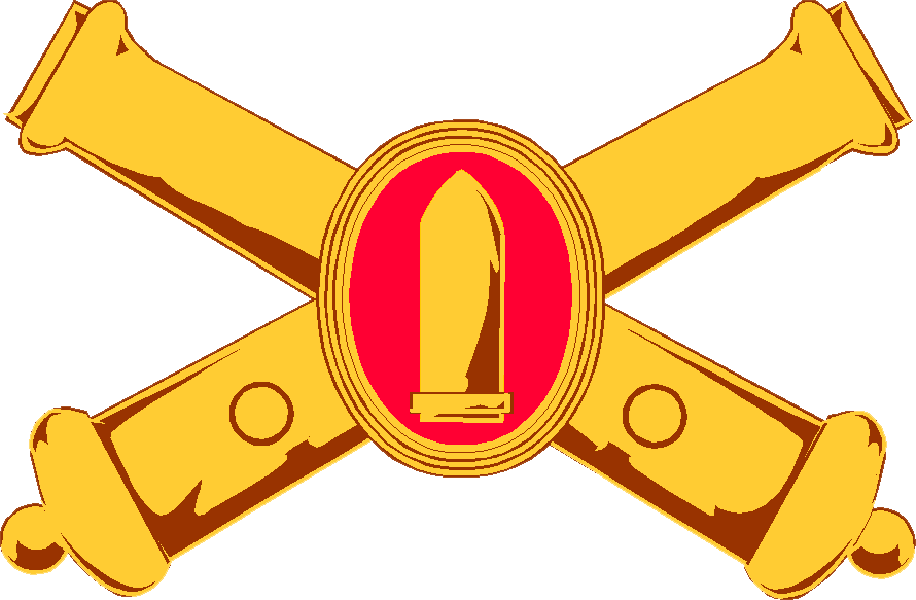
- Milagra Ridge Military Reservation
- Near Pacifica, California in United States

Site information
- Type: Harbor defense installation
- Owner: United States Army
- Controlled by: United States Army Coast Artillery Corps

Site history
- Built: 1943
- Fate: Decommission 1987

Milagra Ridge is a 275-acre (111 ha) open space park that is an isolated island ecosystem, located about 7 miles (11 km) south of San Francisco, between the cities of Pacifica and Daly City. It was first inhabited by the Ohlone indigenous people, and was later claimed by Spanish settlers and Mexican ranchers. It also has a bunkers in the surrounding area.

== History ==
The United States Army acquired the land in the late 1930s as part of a larger defense network that protected San Francisco Bay, including similar fortifications in San Francisco, Angel Island and the Marin Headlands. In 1943 the Army started construction of Battery Construction No. 244 on top of Milagra Ridge, which was called Milagra Ridge Military Reservation at the time. Two 6-inch (152 mm) T2/M1 guns mounted on shielded long-range barbette M4 carriages were moved from Fort Columbia to Battery 244 in 1948. The battery was decommissioned in 1950. Plans were drawn up to build a second gun emplacement armed with larger 16-inch guns, Battery Construction No. 130, but World War II ended before construction started on Battery 130.

In 1956 Nike missile site SF-51 was built here and converted to the Nike-Hercules system in 1958. Typical of Nike sites, SF-51 was divided into an administrative area (SF-51A), an integrated fire control area (SF-51C), and a launcher area (SF-51L); SF-51A and -51L lie within the area of Milagra Ridge, while SF-51C is in the neighboring Sweeney Ridge open space preserve. In 1961, Pacifica considered utilizing the empty Battery 244 casemate as their police station combined with an emergency civil defense headquarters for the County of San Mateo, but in 1969, a different location was chosen, partially due to limited access to the site. However, the City of Pacifica leased some of the underground area to the county for records storage in 1970. In January 1971, some students from Oceana High School broke into the bunker and set the records on fire, followed by another group of arsonists setting fires with highway flares in March 1972. Shortly afterward, officials stopped using the bunker.

The National Guard assumed management of the Nike missile site between 1963 through March 1974, when it was decommissioned and, in May 1974, the land was turned over to the City of Pacifica. Prior to the land transfer, several areas had already been turned over, including 73 acres (30 ha) in 1962 (eventually becoming residential parcels) and 36 acres (15 ha) in 1972, first to the Department of the Interior and then to the City of Pacifica in 1974. The buildings at SF-51A were demolished in 1983 and a condominium complex was built on that site.

In 1987 the National Park Service acquired the remaining 240 acres (97 ha) of Milagra Ridge and made it a part of the Golden Gate National Recreation Area. Community based volunteer efforts have successfully improved the habitat of the Mission Blue and San Bruno elfin butterflies, the San Francisco garter snake and the California red-legged frog, all of which are endangered or threatened species. Residents of Pacifica's Manor district formed the Concerned Manor Residents, which brought a referendum in 1995 to successfully block a large proposed development on the lower slopes of Milagra Ridge; a smaller group of 23 homes was built as a compromise.

Today, it is a protected area and is open for hiking. A new trail, the Milagra Battery Trail, was completed in November 2016. It provides access to Milagra Ridge from a small parking lot at the end of Connemara Drive in Pacifica along a trail approximately 2,000 feet (610 m) long and 5–6 feet (1.5–1.8 m) wide. Milagra Battery Trail is located in 34 acres (14 ha) of land set aside as a conservation easement in a 2007 agreement between the National Park Service and O'Brien Homes and is part of the Bay Area Ridge Trail, along with the existing trail through Milagra Ridge to Sweeney Ridge. The conservation easement was added to the park's land, bringing it up to 275 acres (111 ha). In the late Spring, the area provides thousands of tiny wild coast strawberries interspersed with poison oak.

Milagra Ridge is home to a USGS seismometer that is very close to the city of San Francisco and provides nearly-real-time data to the public.

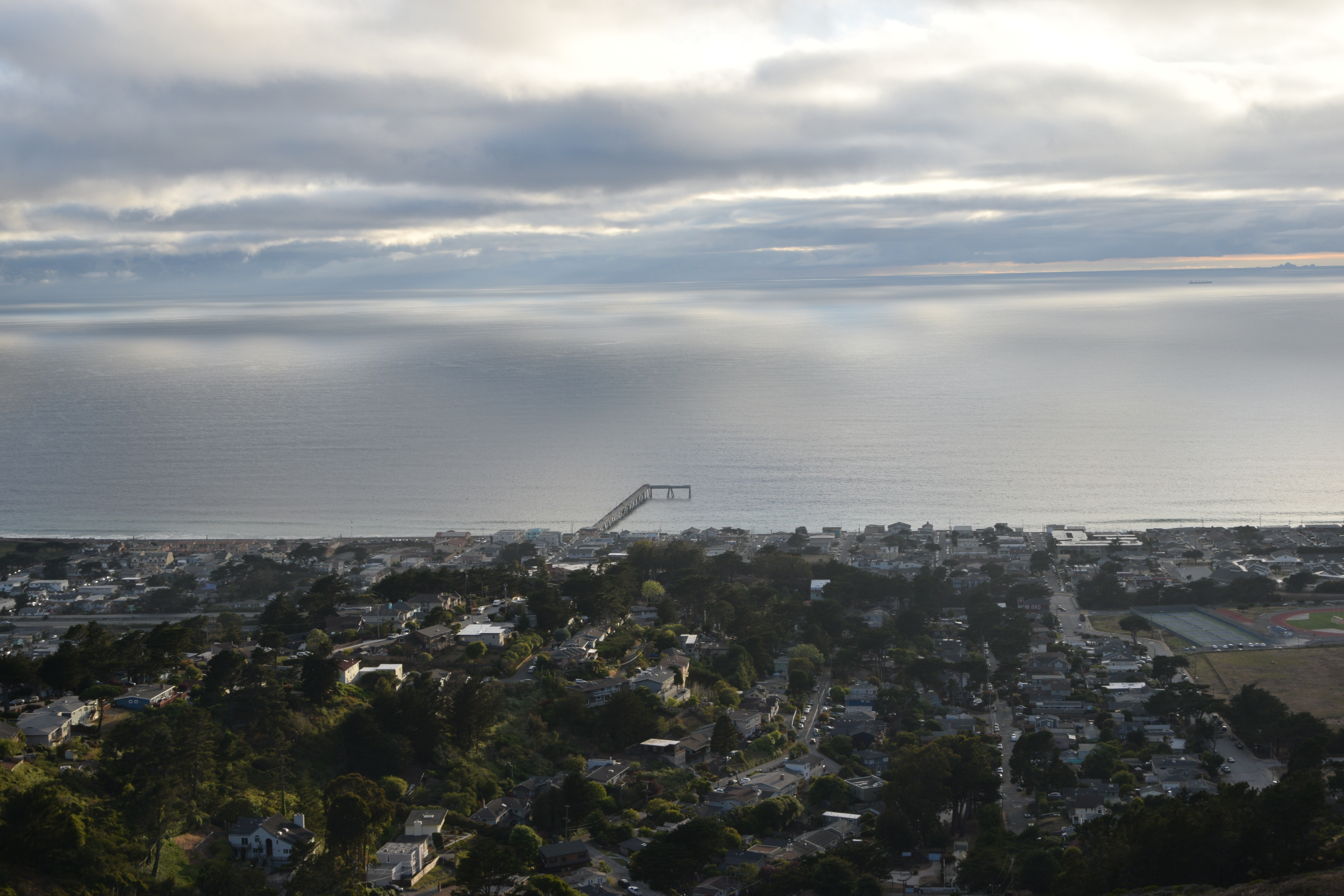
The view of Pacifica from the western side of Milagra Ridge

== Special-status species ==
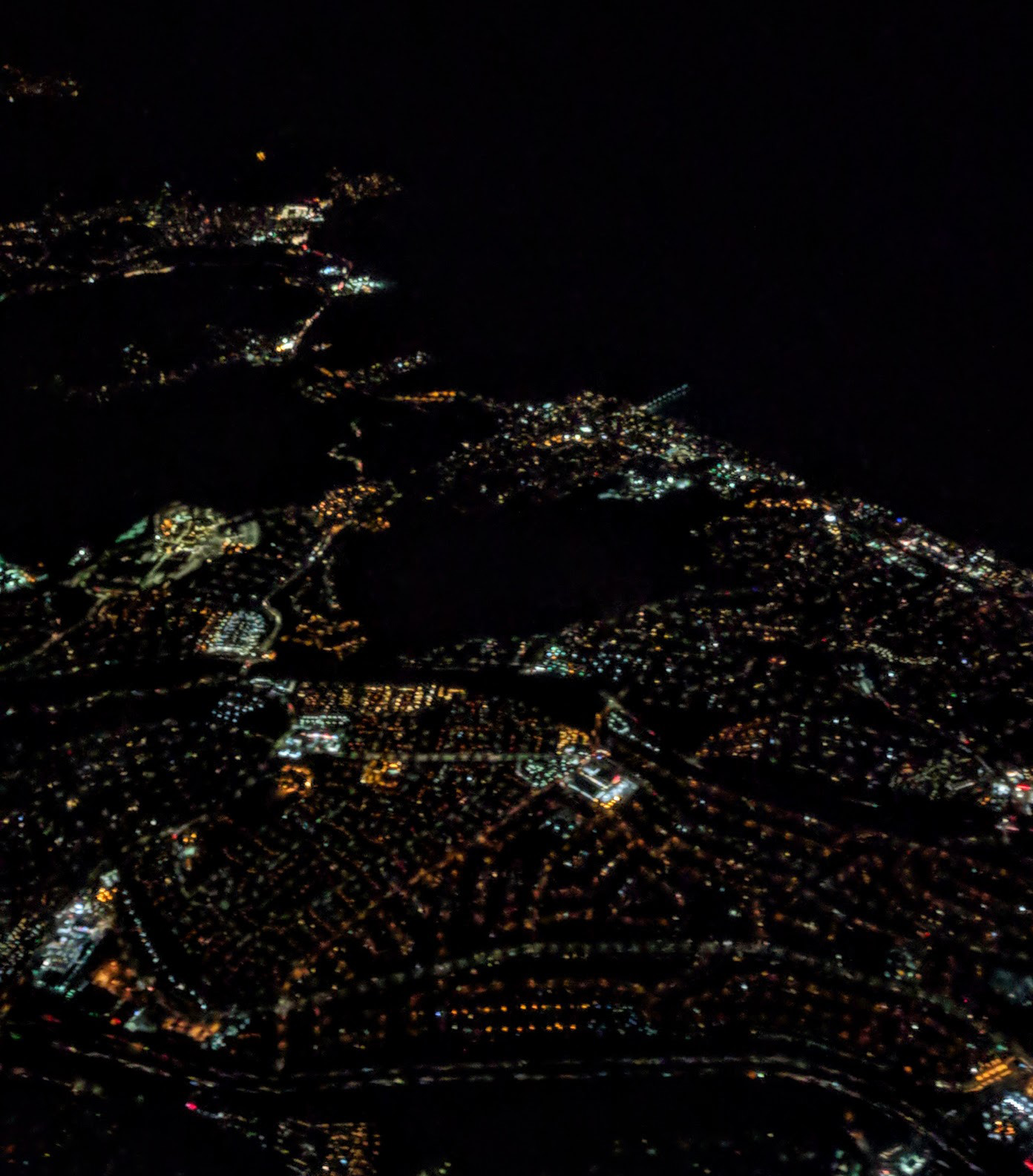
Night aerial view of the Pacific coast at Pacifica, California, and inland to California State Highway 35, Skyline Blvd. The Pacifica Pier is visible as a straight lighted feature sticking into the black ocean region at upper right. The dark inland areas are open space, Milagra Ridge (center) and Sweeney Ridge (left).

Several threatened and endangered species have been observed at Milagra Ridge, including:

- Mission blue butterfly (Aricia icarioides missionensis) as early as 1992, due to the presence of several lupine species foodplants, including Lupinus albifrons, L. formosus, and L. variicolor)
- San Bruno elfin butterfly (Callophrys mossii bayensis) discovered in the mid-1980s
- San Francisco garter snake (Thamnophis sirtalis tetrataenia), not observed and not likely to be present, but it is a suitable habitat
- California red-legged frog (Rana draytonii), presumed existent from small burrows
