= Mori Point =

Park in Pacifica, California, U.S.

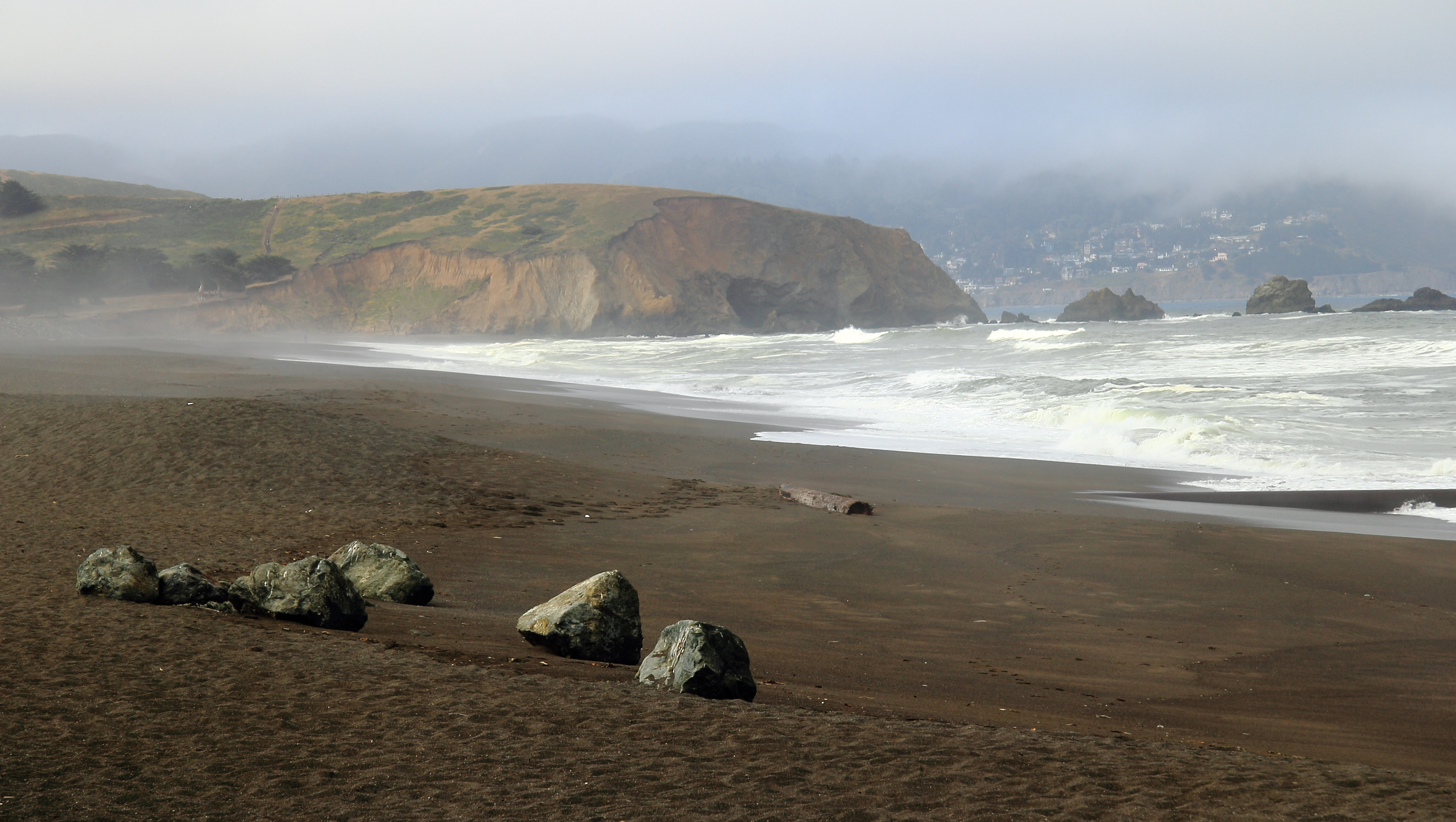
- Mori Point is a prominent bluff extending into the Pacific Ocean, seen from a viewpoint looking south from Pacifica Beach.

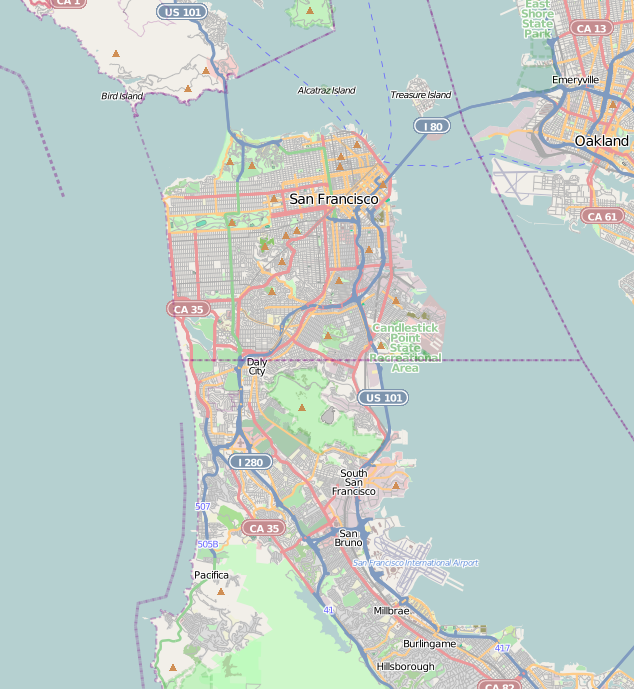
- Location within San Francisco Location within California Location within the United States
- Nearest city: Pacifica
- Coordinates: 37°37′13″N 122°29′54″W
- Area: 110 acres (45 ha)
- Created: 2002
- Operator: National Park Service
- Public transit: samTrans, 110 or 112
- Website: www.nps.gov/goga/learn/nature/mori-point-restoration.htm

Mori Point is a 110-acre (0.4 km^{2}) park located in Pacifica, California, that is part of the Golden Gate National Recreation Area (GGNRA). Mori Point itself is a bluff next to the Pacific Ocean that provides scenic views of the peninsula coastline. In addition to the bluff and ridge, Mori Point contains a few small ponds and wetlands. Trails, many newly built, connect the ridgeline to the entrances to the park and to Sharp Park beach. A portion of the California Coastal Trail will run through Mori Point.

The ponds and wetlands of Mori Point serve as habitat for the threatened California red-legged frog and the endangered San Francisco garter snake. Mori Point also has northern coastal scrub and California coastal prairie habitat in upland areas, and is well known for its spring wildflower displays.

The park is bounded by Laguna Salada Marsh and Sharp Park Municipal Golf Course to the north; by Highway 1 and Sweeney Ridge to the east; and by the Calera Creek Wastewater Treatment Plant to the south.

== History ==
An archaeological survey in 1969 revealed a shell midden at Mori Point, demonstrating pre-Columbian Native American residency. The limestone at Mori Point has been quarried by Native Americans and, later, by the Spanish. Francisco Sanchez received Rancho San Pedro in 1839 during the Rancho period, which encompassed much of present-day Pacifica, including the land that would later be called Mori Point.

The land now occupied by Mori Point was purchased by Stefano Mori and his family in 1888, who operated a farm and ranch at the point. The kitchen, built to feed employees, eventually became the Mori Point Inn, which remained in operation until 1965. The exact date of establishment is in question, but newspaper reports from 1910 cite Steve Mori as manager of the Inn in 1910. During Prohibition, the Inn was a well-known speakeasy.

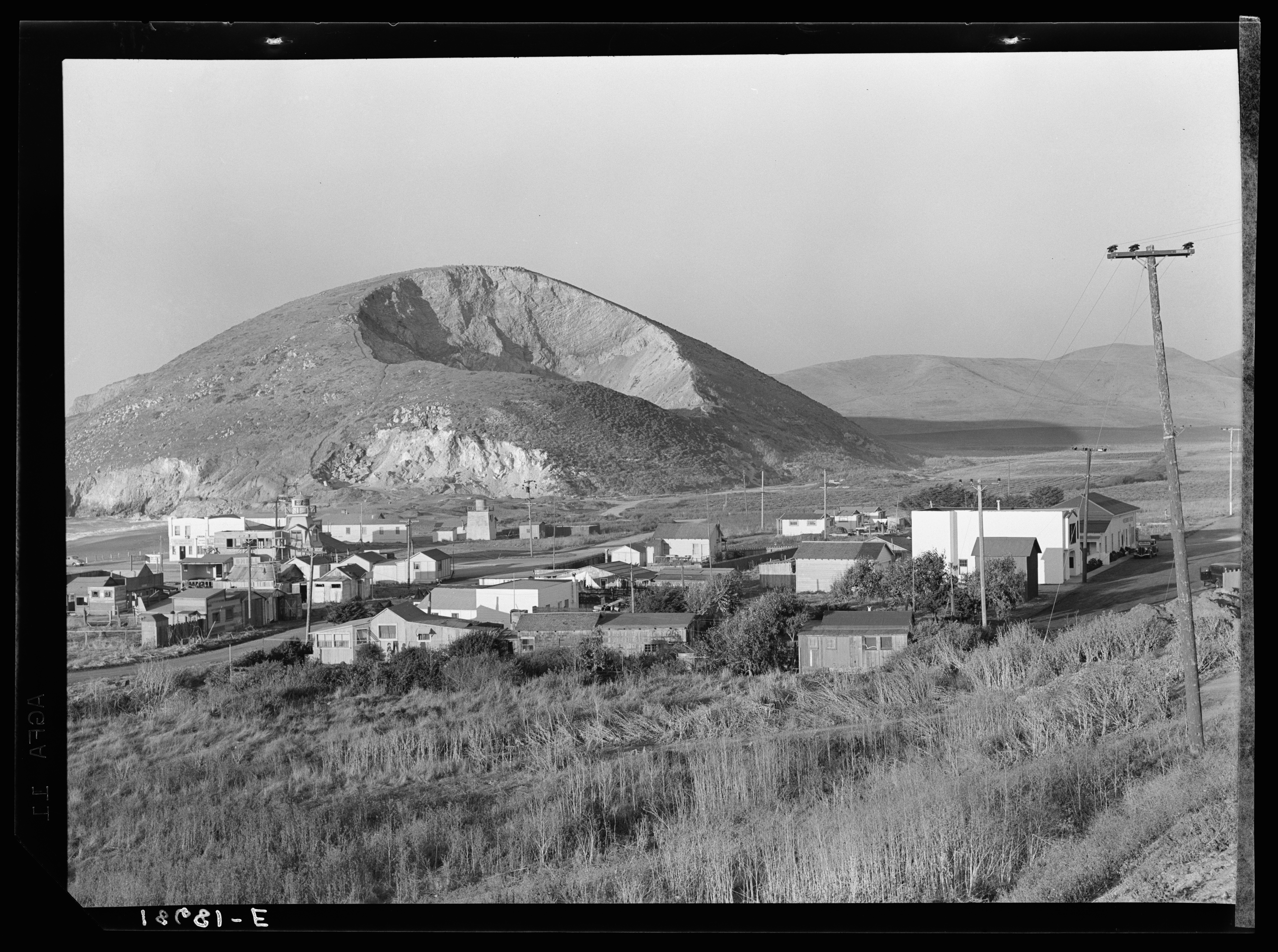
Fishing village on the Pacific coast. Photographed by Dorothea Lange for the Farm Security Administration (1938)

Limestone from the Rockaway Quarry were used as track ballast for the Ocean Shore Railroad and to rebuild San Francisco after the 1906 earthquake. Highway 1, which divides Mori Point from Sweeney Ridge, occupies a cut first intended to accommodate the Ocean Shore Railroad. A 1938 photograph by Dorothea Lange shows a fishing village and the quarry in the background.

During the 1920s, bootleggers used the site to bring alcohol into the Bay Area. Federal agents confiscated 24,000 cases of whiskey worth US$2,000,000 (equivalent to $37,790,000 in 2025) in 1923 from Jack Mori's farm, but Ray (or Rey) Mori was the only family member ever arrested for alcohol-related offenses during Prohibition. Ray was arrested in 1929 for serving alcoholic drinks at the Francisco Sanchez Adobe, which was operated as a restaurant on the surface and clandestinely as a speakeasy and bordello. He received four months of probation and a $225 fine. Ray and his wife Marie took over the operation of the inn by 1932, reportedly because Jack was being pressured by federal agents. The Inn closed in 1965 and it burned down on February 26, 1966, just three months after going out of business.

After the Inn closed in 1965, the hillsides were used for motorcycle racing and sand quarrying, creating scars on the hillsides that are still visible. A development was proposed in 1984 and approved in 1988 by the City Council of Pacifica. The development would have encompassed 60 single-family homes, a horse show arena, and a 275-room hotel and conference center. The group "Pacificans for Mori Point" filed suit to block the development, charging the environmental impact report was incomplete.

The National Park Service published the Pacifica Boundary Study in 1998, which identified several parcels of land in Pacifica it would like to add to the GGNRA. The total proposed addition of land was fifteen parcels totaling 1,075 acres (435 ha), including the Mori Point parcel, and if completed, would result in nearly one-third of the entire land area of the City of Pacifica being controlled by the National Park Service. In 2000, Mori Point was put up for sale at auction, and the Pacifica Land Trust, the California Coastal Conservancy and the Trust for Public Land launched a campaign to purchase the property for preservation with a successful bid of US$3,300,000 (equivalent to $6,170,000 in 2025). The property was purchased at public auction and donated to the Federal Government in 2002, when it was added to GGNRA.

By 2005, two ponds were dug on the north side of the Mori Point plot to restore habitat for the red-legged frog and Pacific tree frogs, hoping to establish frog colonies and attract their predators, the San Francisco garter snake. Frog eggs were spotted by the spring of 2005 and the snakes were seen foraging next to the ponds in 2007.

In the Fall of 2007, the Mori Point Project, made up of staff from the Golden Gate National Recreation Area, the Golden Gate National Parks Conservancy, and volunteers, completed the removal of soil contaminated with diesel fuel, the creation of a new pond and wetlands area and a new path with access steps nicknamed "Bootlegger's Steps" up to the top of Mori Point bluff.

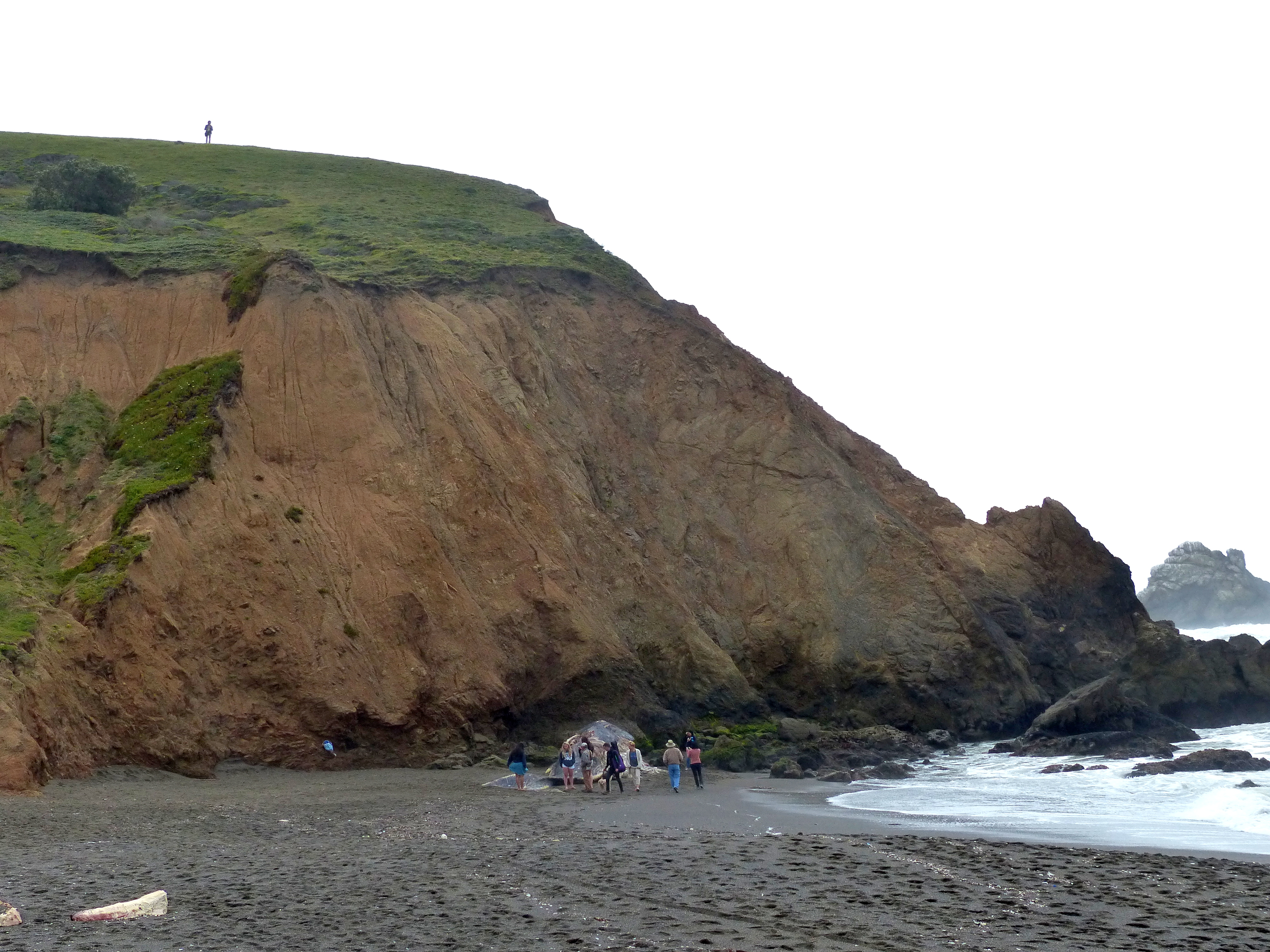
Dead sperm whale on beach below Mori Point (April 2015)

In April 2015, a 48 ft (15 m) long sperm whale washed up on the beach below Mori Point. Although the whale was emaciated, a necropsy ruled out common causes of death such as disease, age, shark attack, or being struck by a ship. A second whale, a 32 ft (9.8 m) long female humpback whale, washed up just 0.25 miles (0.40 km) north of the sperm whale three weeks later on Sharp Park Beach. The second whale had injuries consistent with a ship strike and due to the odor, both whales were buried later in May.

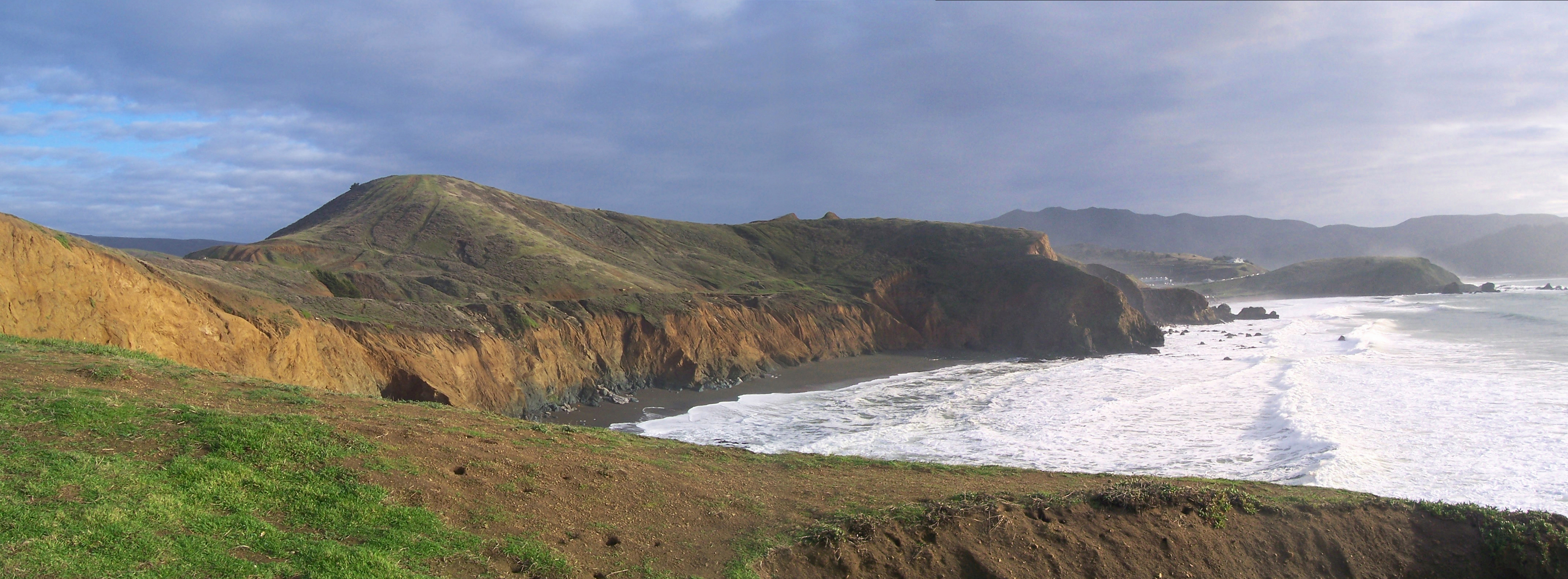
From atop Mori Point, a view of the coast looking south

== In popular culture ==
Mori Point is featured in the climactic scene from the 1971 movie Harold and Maude. A customized Jaguar E-Type, modified to look like a hearse, is driven off the bluff, landing on the beach below.
