= Jean Fassler =

American politician (1919–2018)

- Born: Jean Frances Fassler; June 7, 1919; Quincy, California, U.S.
- Died: November 18, 2018 (aged 99); Grass Valley, California
- Years active: 1957–1979
- Spouse: Joseph L Fassler (m. 1942)

Jean Frances Fassler (1919-2018) was an American mayor, councilwoman and county supervisor in California. She became the first mayor of the city of Pacifica, California when it became incorporated in 1957, where she was subsequently elected to two more terms. Fassler also served for several years on the Pacifica City Council, the San Mateo County Board of Supervisors and a presidential committee before retiring to Roseville, California with her husband in 1979.
