= Rockaway Quarry =

Limestone quarry in California

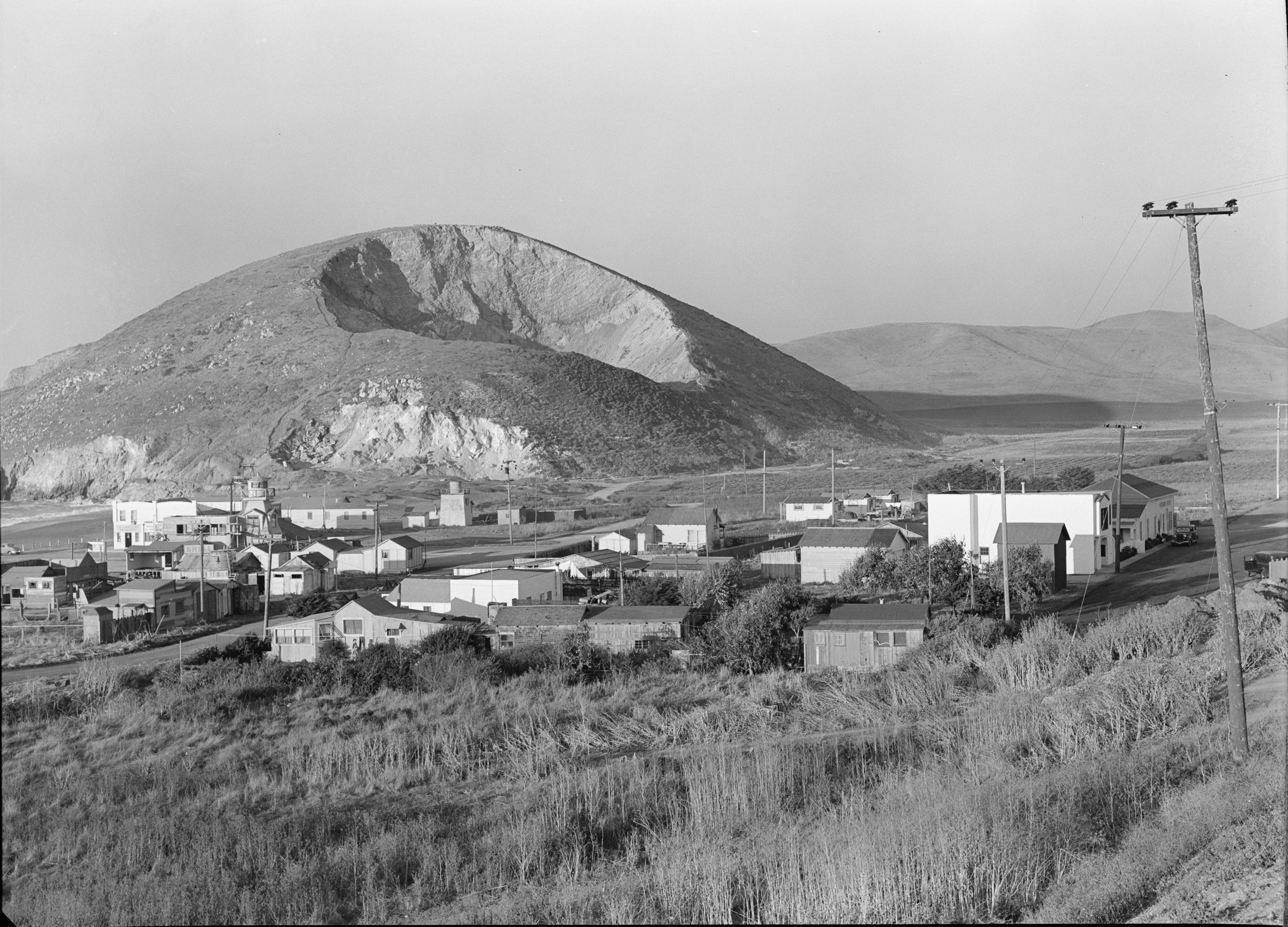
- Rockaway Quarry by Dorothea Lange, 1938

- Location in California
- Location: Rockaway Beach, Pacifica, California, United States; 37.613882°N 122.495263°W
- Products: Calera limestone
- Opened: 1776
- Closed: 1987

The Rockaway Quarry was a Calera limestone quarry in Pacifica, California, in the San Francisco Bay Area. Limestone from the site was first extracted by Ohlone from the village of Pruristac. Beginning in 1776, New Spaniards used California Indian labor to mine limestone and build structures like the Presidio and San Francisco missions. After the 1906 earthquake, the quarry's limestone was used to rebuild San Francisco. By the 1960s, operations declined, and the quarry permanently closed in 1987. Today it is privately held but is used as an informal hiking trail.

== History ==
The village of Timigtac was located around the present-day Rockaway Beach area, near Mori Point. A large shellmound in the area indicates the region was long inhabited by the Aramai of the Ramaytush Ohlone. The inhabitants of Timigtac and another nearby village Pruristac actively quarried limestone from the mountain for trade, construction, and decoration. Timigtac and Pruristac were the only Ohlone villages between Montara Mountain and the Golden Gate due to strong coastal winds and sandy soil.

Spanish colonization of San Francisco began in 1769 with the first European sighting of the San Francisco Bay. By 1776, Spanish settlers employed Indian labor to quarry limestone from the Rockaway Quarry to build the San Francisco Presidio and mission buildings. The lime pits were also used to make whitewash. In this period, the quarry was under the control of the Franciscan padres at Mission San Francisco de Asís.

After Mexican Independence and secularization, present-day Pacifica was granted to the mayor of San Francisco and Commandant of the Presidio, Francisco Sánchez, as the Rancho San Pedro. Sánchez used the Rockaway Quarry to produce whitewash for his adobe home, which was completed in 1846.

Following the Mexican–American War, the Rockaway Quarry was sold and quarrying declined. In 1906, however, the dual requirements of Ocean Shore Railroad construction and the 1906 earthquake resulted in the reopening of the Rockaway Quarry in 1907, due to it being one of the few areas in the San Francisco area where limestone was available in industrial quantities. The quarry provided ballast and the trackbed of the railroad, and building material to rebuild the city. The quarry's operators were E.B. and A.L. Stone, who leased the quarry from the Tobin family of San Francisco.

In 1942, the Tobin family transferred ownership to Hibernia Bank. Horace Hill then bought it and established Rockaway Quarry, Incorporated, producing concrete aggregate, ballast, and high-grade limestone during World War II. Other companies began limestone production around Rockaway Beach, and pits appeared on the north and west sides of Mori Point by the 1950s. The Quarry was sold in 1953, and leased to Howard Marks from 1953 to 1968, to Rhodes & Jamieson from 1968 to 1975, and then to the last commercial operations, Quarry Products Incorporated, from 1975 until its closure in 1987.

When commercial quarrying ended, much of the area was left in degraded condition with unstable slopes, bare rocky bluffs, and soil vulnerable to invasive vegetation. Non-native species are still commonly found around the area, and portions of the property were converted into a wastewater treatment plant in 2000.

== Geology ==
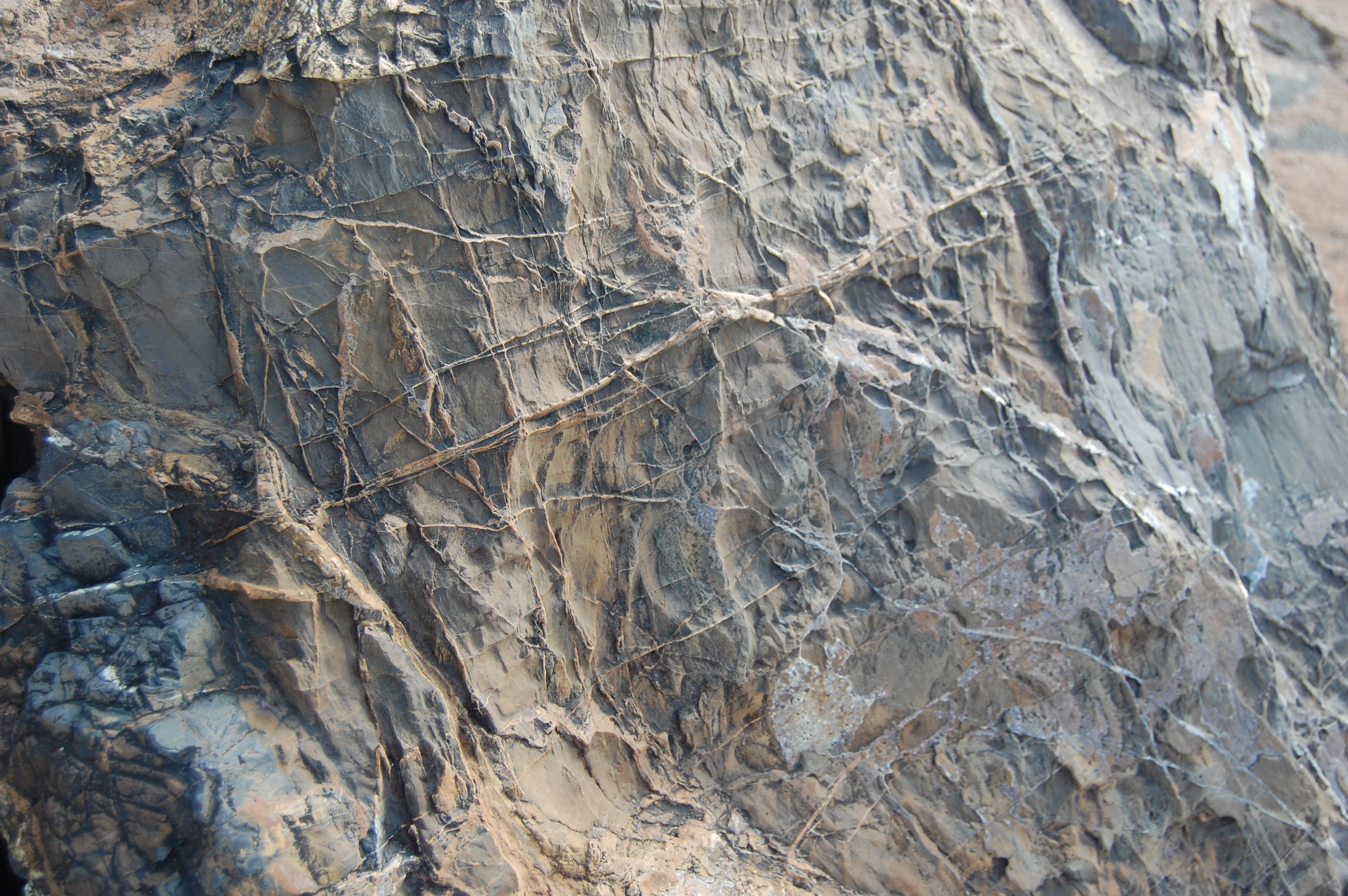
Close-up image of Calera Limestone at Rockaway Beach

The area lies between the Pilarcitos Fault, the San Andreas Fault, and the San Gregorio Fault. Geologists have dated fossils at the site as between 88 and 105 million years old – in the middle of the long Cretaceous Period. Calera limestone found at Rockaway Quarry is part of a group of Franciscan rocks called the Permanente terrane, which was carried to the ocean's edge through earthquakes over a period of 25 million years. Geochemical studies of Calera limestone show that fragments of the rock may be dismembered oceanic crust.

== Reclamation ==
In January 2023, a reclamation plan was proposed for the Rockaway Quarry site. The plan focused on grading the uneven slopes, replanting native vegetation, and creating a wetlands area. Approval from the California Coastal Commission and the City of Pacifica would be needed for any reclamation project.

== Development proposals ==
There have been multiple efforts over the years to develop the abandoned quarry. In the late-1990s, housing and a convention center were proposed but blocked by local environmental groups. In 2005, a 355 residential units project, a luxury hotel and retail space were voted down by Pacificans in a referendum called Measure L. The property was sold in 2009, and in 2016, Pacifica voters again rejected a development which would have included an office and retail building, 206-unit apartment complex, 188-room hotel, 13,000 square foot conference center, and 12-unit hotel bungalow complex.

== See also ==
- Guadalupe Valley Creek
- Permanente Quarry
