= Pacifica, California =

City in San Mateo County, California, US

Pacifica
- City
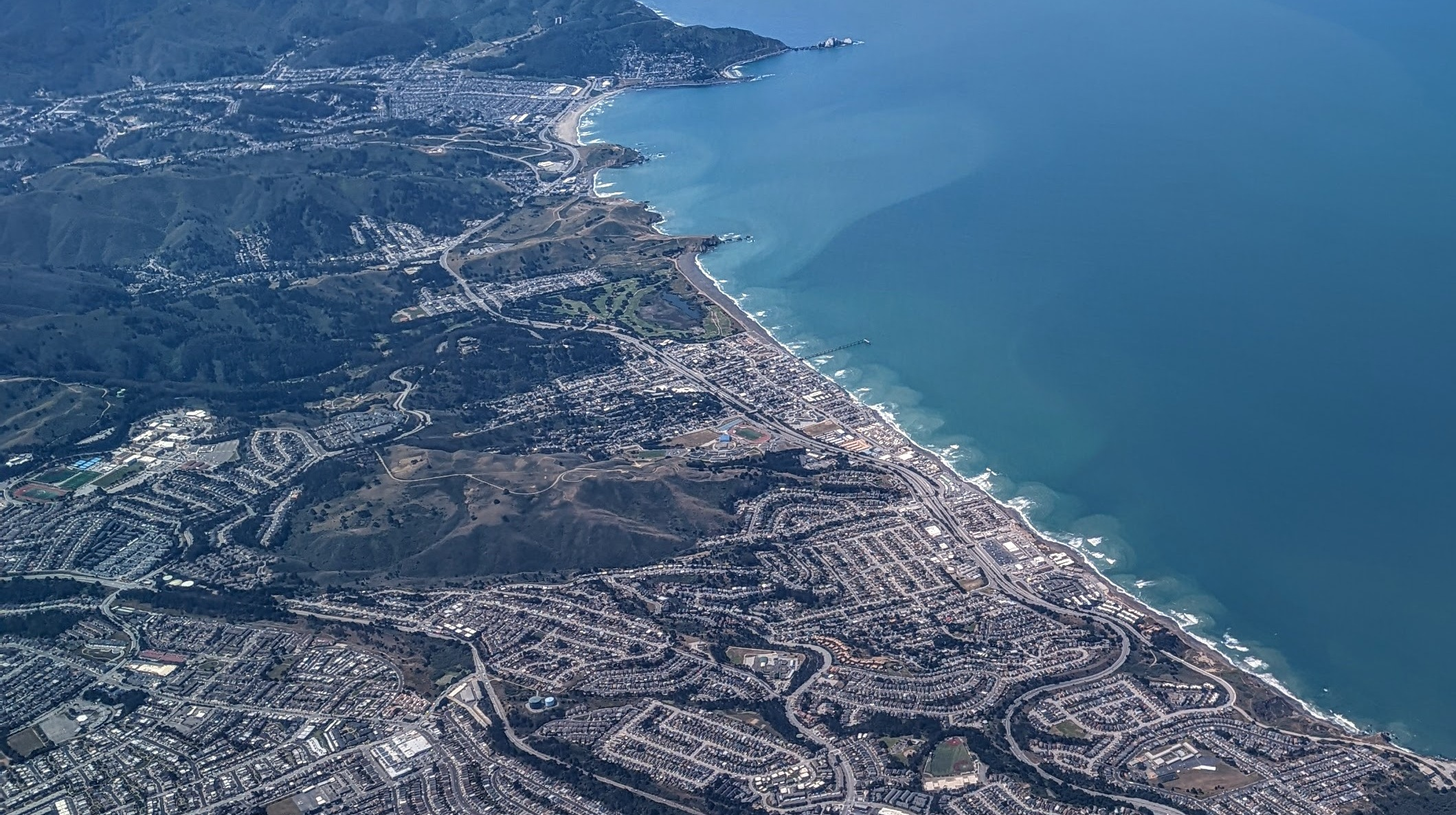
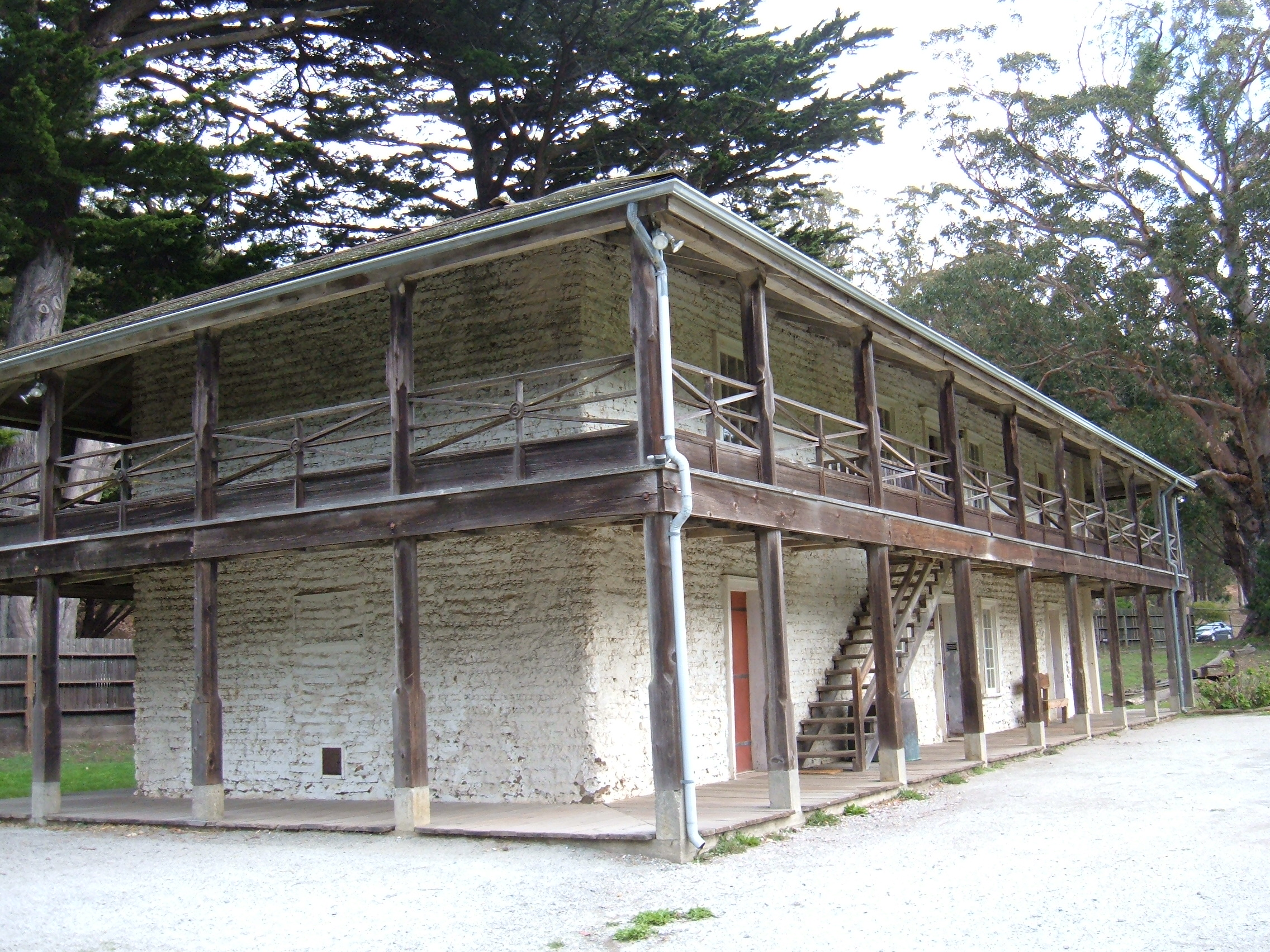
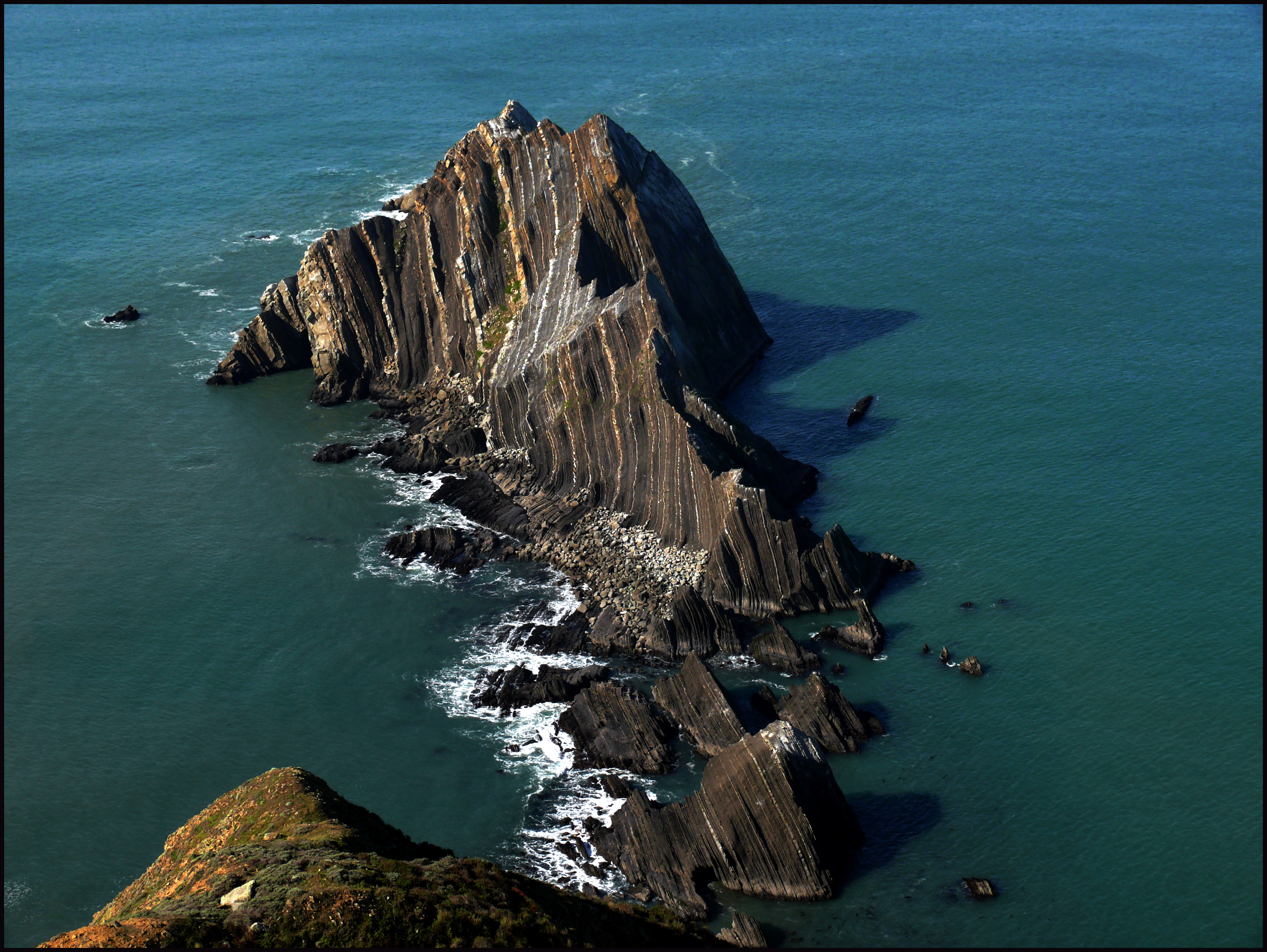
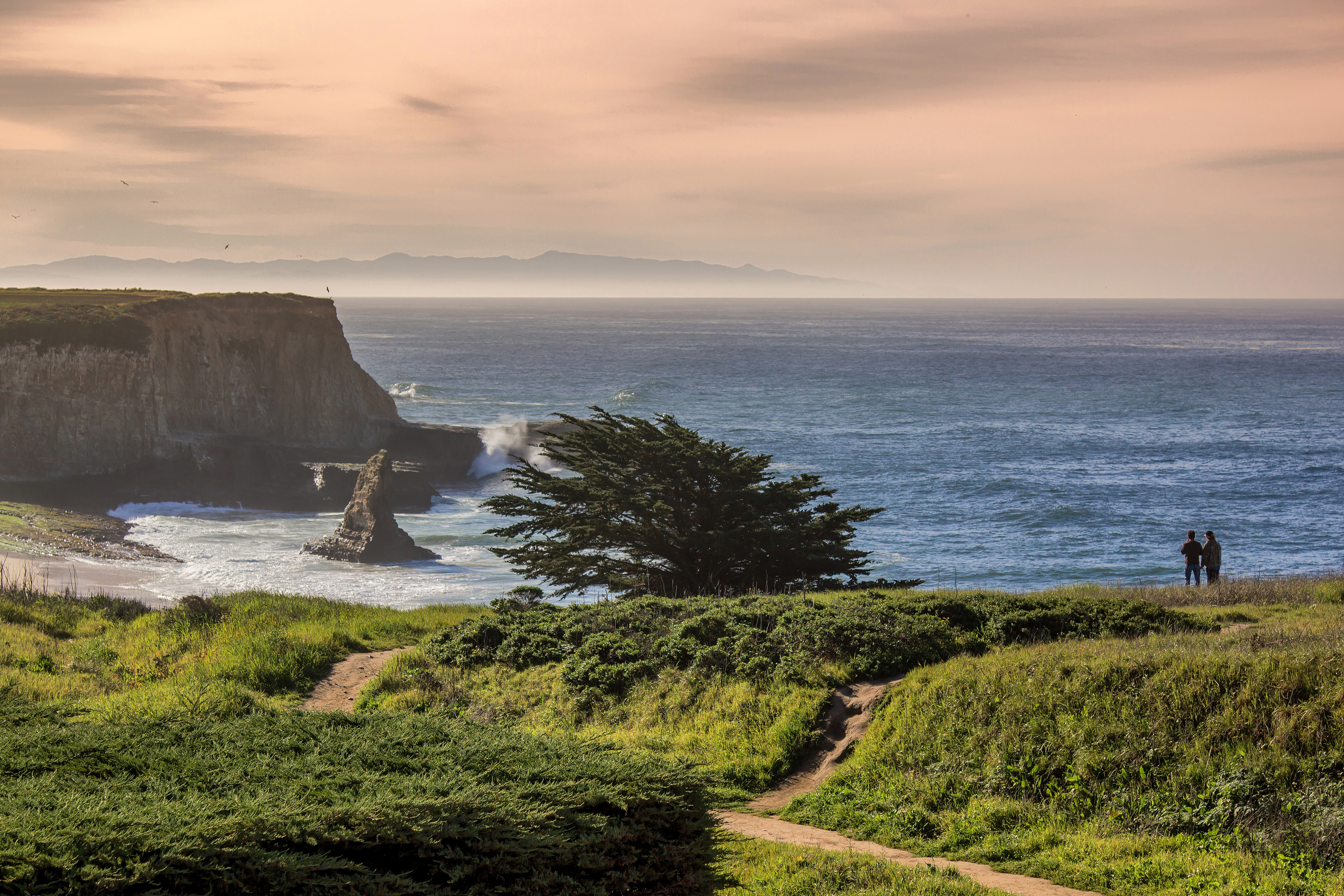
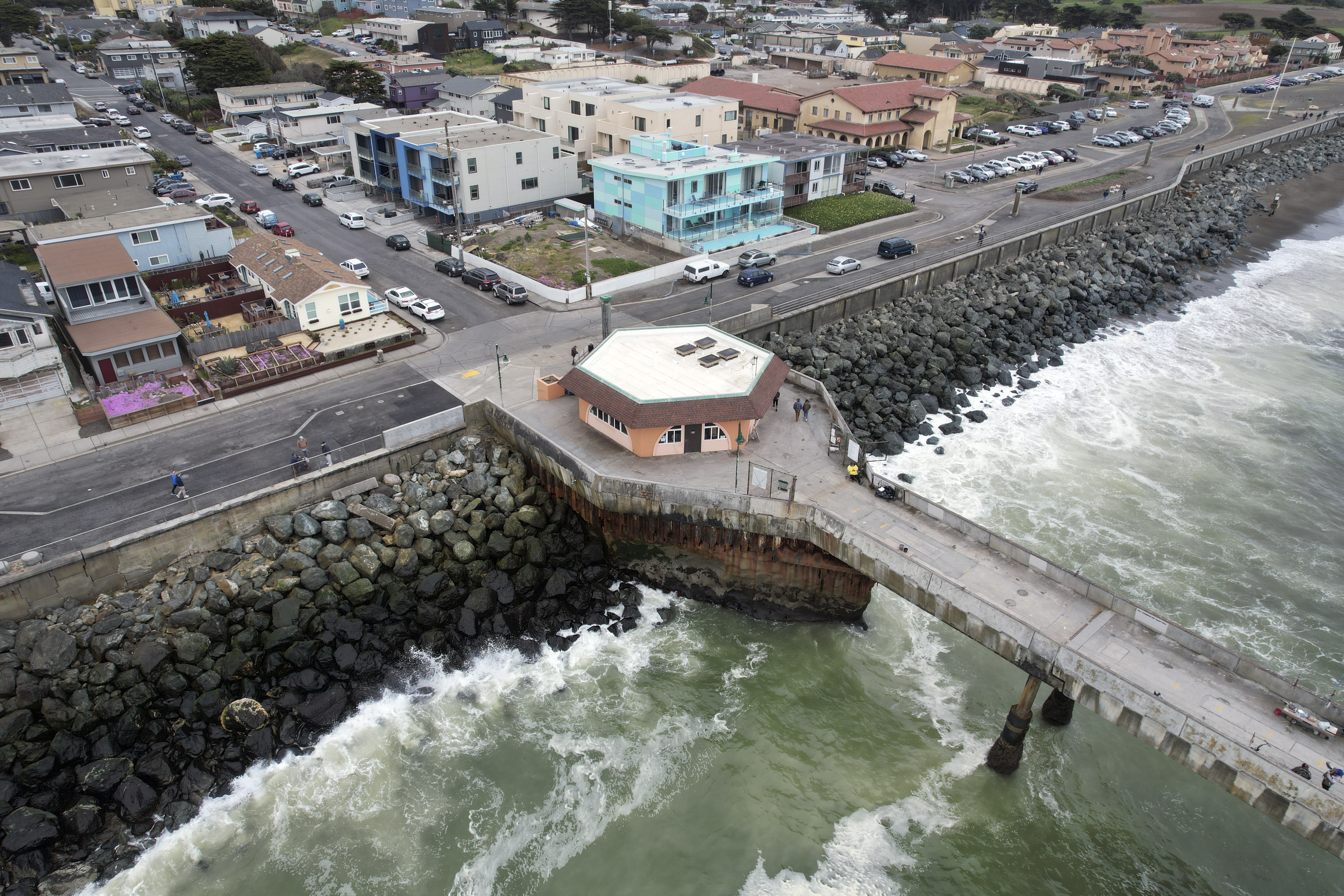
- Aerial view of Pacifica Sánchez Adobe San Pedro Rock Mori Point Pacifica Pier

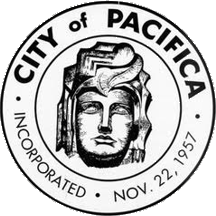
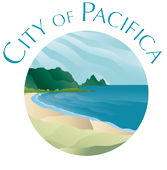
- Seal Logo
- Nickname: The fog capital of California
- Coordinates: 37°37′22″N 122°29′8″W
- Country: United States
- State: California
- County: San Mateo
- Incorporated: November 22, 1957

Government
  - Mayor: Sue Beckmeyer
  - Mayor Pro Tempore: Christine Boles

Area
  - Total: 12.59 sq mi (32.61 km^{2})
  - Land: 12.58 sq mi (32.59 km^{2})
  - Water: 0.0077 sq mi (0.02 km^{2}) 0.07%
- Elevation: 82 ft (25 m)

Population (2020)
  - Total: 38,640
  - Density: 3,071/sq mi (1,186/km^{2})
- Time zone: UTC-8 (Pacific)
  - Summer (DST): UTC-7 (PDT)
- ZIP codes: 94044, 94045
- Area code: 650
- FIPS code: 06-54806
- GNIS feature IDs: 277613, 2411351
- Website: www.cityofpacifica.org

Pacifica (Spanish: Pacífica, meaning "Peaceful") is a city in San Mateo County, California, United States, on the coast of the Pacific Ocean between San Francisco and Half Moon Bay. As of the 2020 census, Pacifica had a population of 38,640.

== History ==
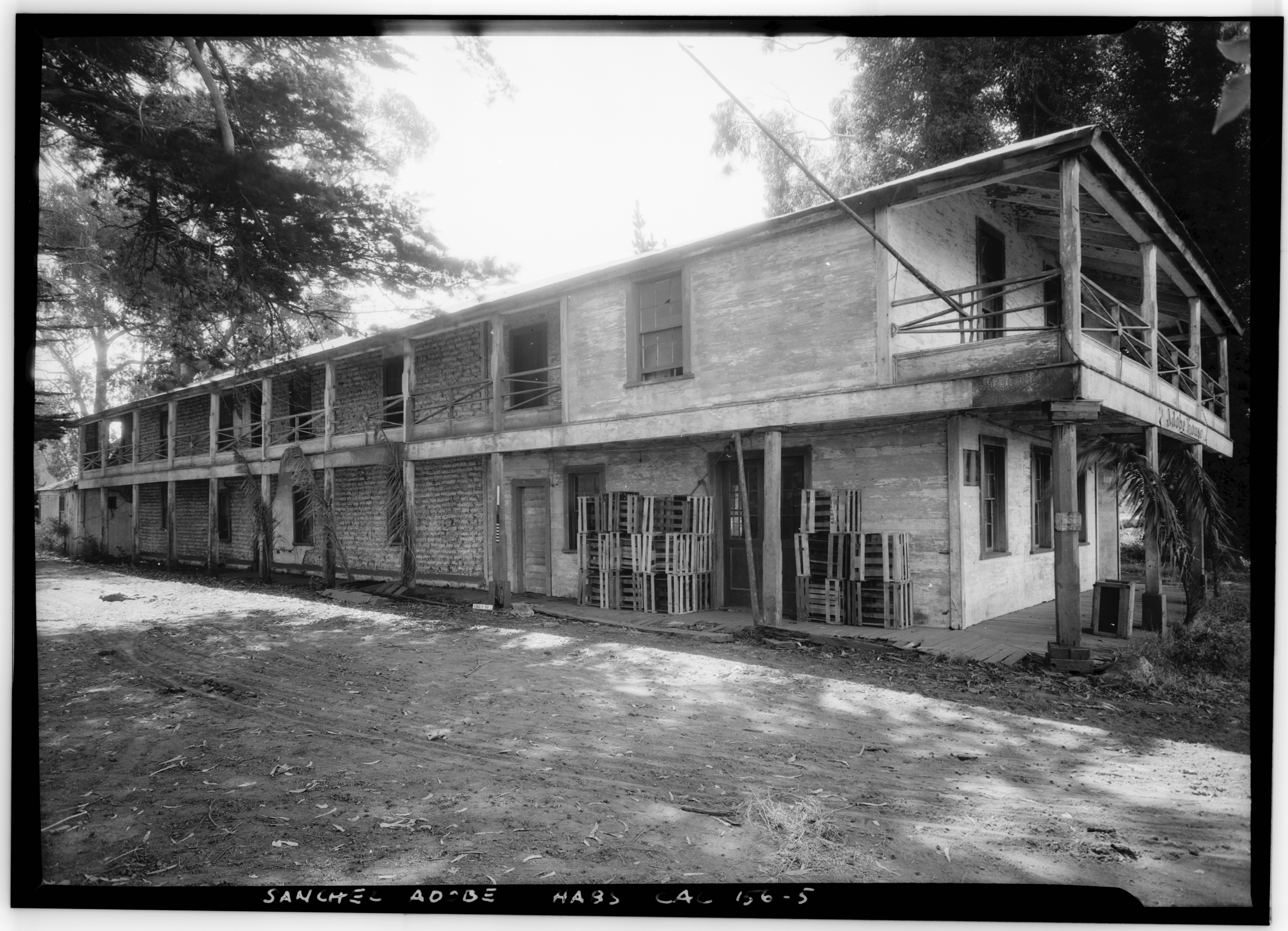
The Sanchez Adobe in Pacifica is the oldest structure in San Mateo County.

Before European settlers arrived, Pacifica was home to two significant Ohlone Indian villages: Pruristac located at San Pedro Creek near present-day Adobe Drive, and Timigtac on Calera Creek in the Rockaway Beach neighborhood.

Pacifica is the location of the oldest European encounter with the San Francisco Bay. An expedition led by Gaspar de Portolà sighted the bay by climbing the hills of Sweeney Ridge in Pacifica on November 4, 1769. Before then, earlier Spanish maritime explorers of the California coast Juan Cabrillo and Sebastian Vizcaino had missed the San Francisco Bay because heavy fog so frequently shrouded its entrance from the Pacific Ocean (the Golden Gate). Sighting the San Francisco Bay accelerated the Spanish colonization of Alta California because it was the only large, safe, centrally located harbor on the Alta California coast. The Spanish had known about Monterey Bay since the sixteenth century, but, unlike San Francisco Bay, it was too exposed to rough currents and winds to be used as major harbor for their trade between Asia and Mexico. In the Spanish era, Pacifica was the site of the San Pedro Valley Mission Outpost (1786–1793) of Mission Dolores. That was dissolved when a newly independent Mexico secularized the mission system. Pacifica is also the site of the still-extant Mexican-era Sánchez Adobe, built in 1846. The city is located on a part of the Mexican land grant Rancho San Pedro given to Francisco Sanchez in 1839.

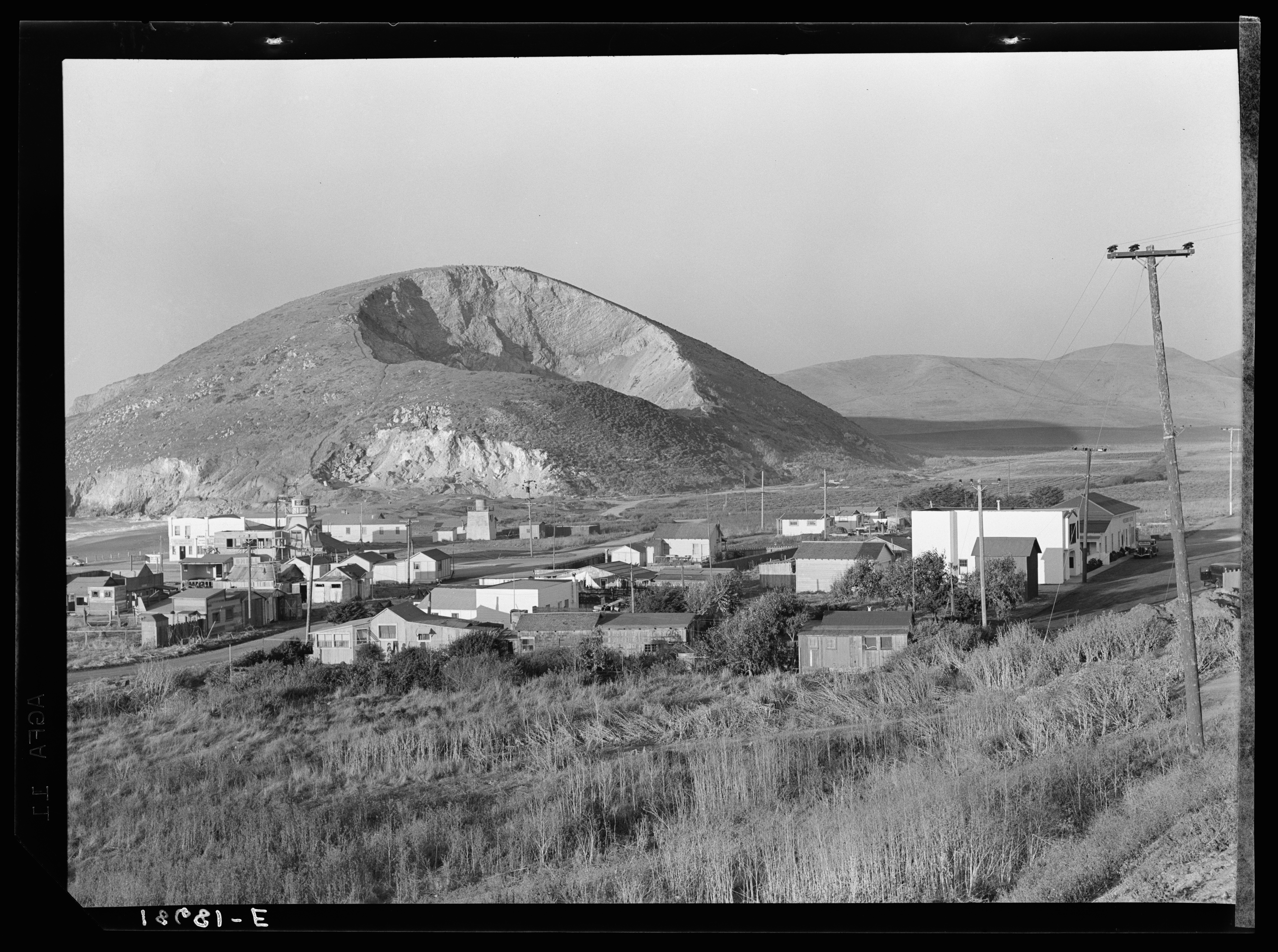
Rockaway Beach and quarry in 1938. Photograph by Dorothea Lange.

During World War II, the area around the present-day Sharp Park recreational area held the Sharp Park Detention Station, an INS processing facility for Japanese Americans, Japanese nationals, and other "foreign enemies" during Japanese internment. The Stanford professor Yamato Ichihashi spent six weeks in Sharp Park. He described the facility, writing, "The ground is limited by tall iron net-fences and small in area; barracks 20' x 120' are well-built and painted outside and inside and are regularly arranged; there are 10 of these for inmates, each accommodating about 40, divided into 5 rooms for 8 persons each; if double-decked (beds), 80 can be put in."

On February 20, 1956, the Hazel's Inn raid occurred in Sharp Park. Sheriff Earl Whitmore told the San Mateo County Times at the time, "The purpose of the raid was to let it be known that we are not going to tolerate gatherings of homosexuals in this county." Ninety people were arrested that night, and the majority were San Francisco residents.

Pacifica was incorporated in 1957, relatively recently in the history of San Mateo County. Its first elected mayor was Jean Fassler, one of the first women mayors in California. It was the union of nine previously separate, unincorporated communities–Fairmont, Westview, Pacific Manor (or just Manor), Sharp Park, Fairway Park, Vallemar, Rockaway Beach, Linda Mar and Pedro Point–some of which were stops on the short-lived Ocean Shore Railroad. The name "Pacifica" was chosen from Thomas Barca, by vote; "Coastside" was a close runner-up. In 1960, the city seal was designed by resident Ralph Barkey, who was inspired by Ralph Stackpole's towering "Pacifica" statue produced for the 1939–1940 Golden Gate International Exposition on Treasure Island in the San Francisco Bay.

== Geography ==
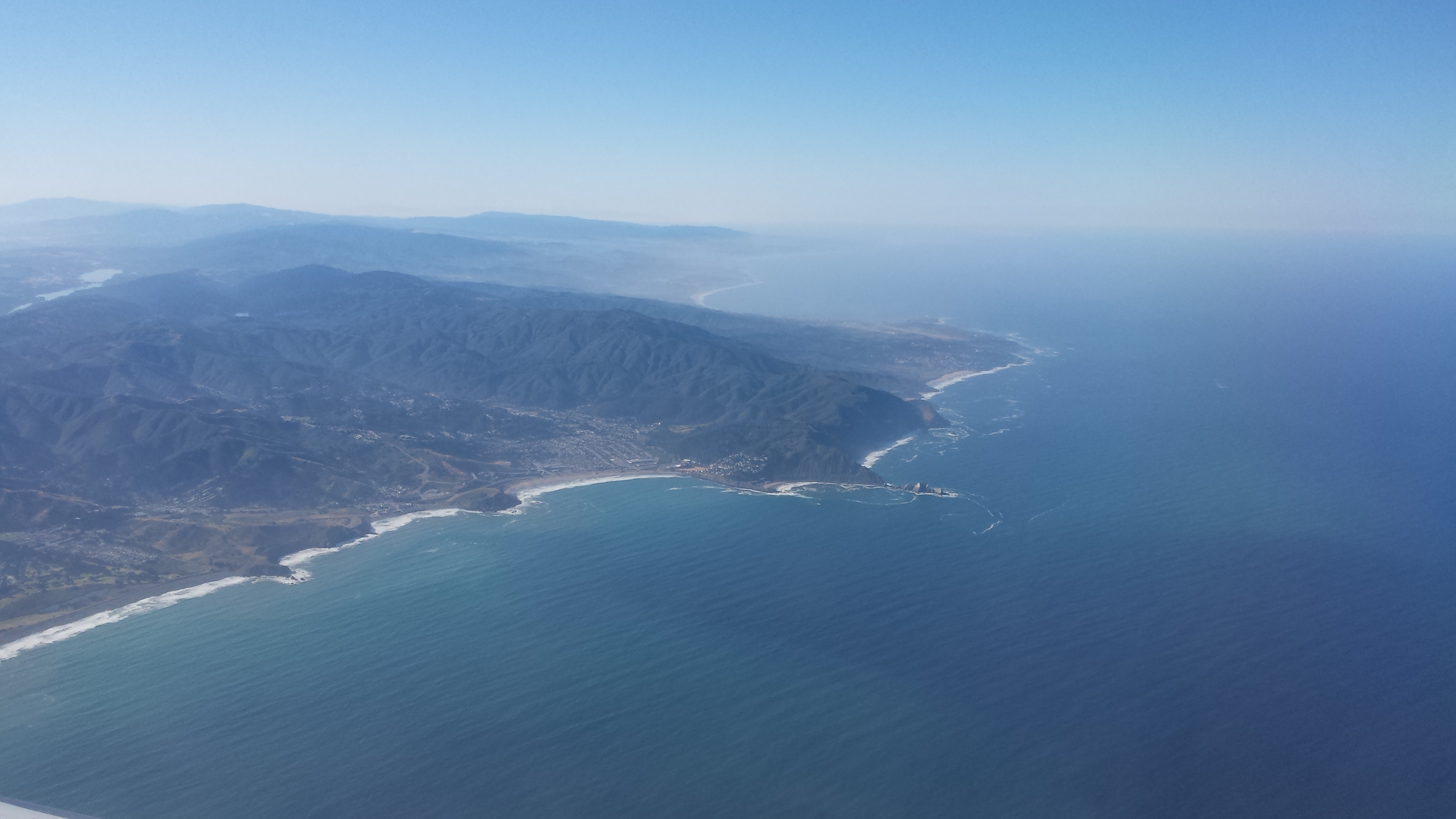
An aerial view of Pacifica's geography. Pacifica State Beach is just left of upper center.

=== Topography ===
Pacifica straddles San Pedro Creek which flows from the western slope of Sweeney Ridge. The far eastern portion of Pacifica includes San Andreas Creek which flows down the eastern slope of Sweeney Ridge. The Portola expedition followed these two creeks in the discovery of San Francisco Bay. Calera Creek runs through Pacifica Quarry and is protected as ESHA Environmentally Sensitive Habitat.

=== Climate ===
Pacifica, California

Climate chart (precipitation, max. and min. temperature)
J	F	M	A	M	J	J	A	S	O	N	D
6.1 58 45	6.5 60 46	4.5 61 46	2.4 64 48	1 67 49	0.3 69 51	0.1 69 52	0.1 71 53	0.1 72 53	1.5 70 52	2.9 64 50	6.6 59 46
- █ Average max. and min. temperatures in °F
- █ Precipitation totals in inches
Metric conversion
J	F	M	A	M	J	J	A	S	O	N	D
155 14 7	165 16 8	114 16 8	61 18 9	25 19 9	7.6 21 11	2.5 21 11	2.5 22 12	2.5 22 12	38 21 11	74 18 10	168 15 8
- █ Average max. and min. temperatures in °C
- █ Precipitation totals in mm

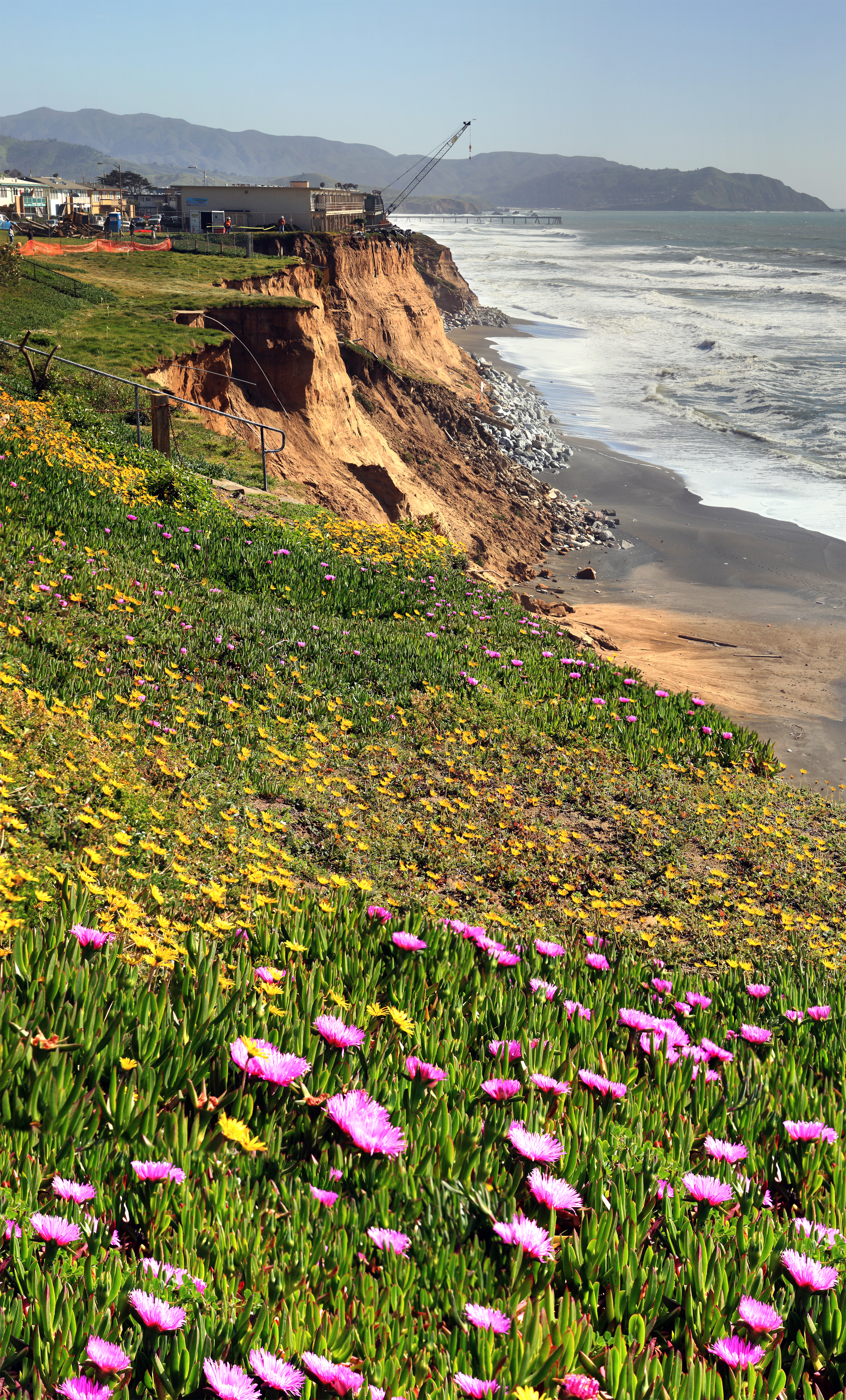
Erosion and spring

Pacifica has a warm-summer Mediterranean climate (Köppen climate classification Csb) typical of coastal areas of California. The National Weather Service has maintained a cooperative weather station in Pacifica since November 1, 1983. Based on those records, average January temperatures range from 45.8 to 56.7 °F (7.7 to 13.7 °C) and average September temperatures range from 53.9 to 71.8 °F (12.2 to 22.1 °C). There are an average of 3.0 days with highs of 90 °F (32 °C) or higher and an average of 0.2 day with lows of 32 °F (0 °C) or lower. The highest temperature on record was 102 °F (39 °C) on October 5, 1987, and the lowest temperature was 23 °F (−5 °C) on December 22, 1990. Annual precipitation averages 30.29 inches (769 mm) and has ranged from 15.88 inches (403 mm) in 1990 to 43.17 inches (1,097 mm) in 1996. The most rainfall in one month was 18.05 inches (458 mm) in February 1998 and the most rainfall in 24 hours was 5.00 inches (127 mm) on December 27, 2004. There are an average of 66 days annually with measurable precipitation, most of which falls from October through May. Summer fogs often produce light drizzle in the night and morning hours. Condensation from the fogs also produces fog drip from trees overnight. No measurable snowfall has been recorded since records began. The southeastern portions of the municipality, such as Park Pacifica, are known to be much sunnier than the rest of the city.

Climate data for Pacifica, California, 1991–2020 normals, extremes 1983–2012
Month	Jan	Feb	Mar	Apr	May	Jun	Jul	Aug	Sep	Oct	Nov	Dec	Year
Record high °F (°C)	74 (23)	78 (26)	82 (28)	93 (34)	95 (35)	98 (37)	100 (38)	96 (36)	98 (37)	102 (39)	81 (27)	74 (23)	102 (39)
Mean daily maximum °F (°C)	58.1 (14.5)	60.1 (15.6)	61.4 (16.3)	63.9 (17.7)	66.9 (19.4)	68.8 (20.4)	69.4 (20.8)	71.0 (21.7)	72.3 (22.4)	70.1 (21.2)	64.1 (17.8)	58.8 (14.9)	65.4 (18.6)
Daily mean °F (°C)	51.7 (10.9)	53.1 (11.7)	53.8 (12.1)	55.7 (13.2)	58.2 (14.6)	59.8 (15.4)	60.8 (16.0)	62.2 (16.8)	62.9 (17.2)	61.2 (16.2)	56.9 (13.8)	52.5 (11.4)	57.4 (14.1)
Mean daily minimum °F (°C)	45.3 (7.4)	46.0 (7.8)	46.1 (7.8)	47.6 (8.7)	49.4 (9.7)	50.8 (10.4)	52.3 (11.3)	53.3 (11.8)	53.4 (11.9)	52.3 (11.3)	49.7 (9.8)	46.2 (7.9)	49.4 (9.7)
Record low °F (°C)	29 (−2)	27 (−3)	33 (1)	37 (3)	38 (3)	44 (7)	42 (6)	40 (4)	36 (2)	38 (3)	35 (2)	22 (−6)	22 (−6)
Average precipitation inches (mm)	6.14 (156)	6.48 (165)	4.45 (113)	2.36 (60)	1.00 (25)	0.25 (6.4)	0.01 (0.25)	0.08 (2.0)	0.11 (2.8)	1.50 (38)	2.86 (73)	6.64 (169)	31.88 (810.45)
Average precipitation days (≥ 0.01 in)	10.8	11.9	9.7	6.3	4.3	1.7	0.3	1.3	1.6	3.5	6.7	10.6	68.7
Source 1: NOAA
Source 2: National Weather Service

=== Cityscape ===
Pacifica is divided into roughly eleven districts from north to south:

1. Fairmont
2. Westview (Pacific Highlands)
3. Pacific Manor (Manor)
4. Edgemar
5. Sharp Park
6. Fairway Park
7. Vallemar
8. Rockaway Beach
9. Pedro Point and Shelter Cove in the south west
10. Linda Mar, Linda Mar Valley, (formerly Pedro Valley or San Pedro Valley) in the south.
11. Park Pacifica in south east portions of the city (called the Back of the Valley).
12. Terra Nova

== Demographics ==
Historical population
Census	Pop.	Note	%±
1960	20,995		—
1970	36,020		71.6%
1980	36,866		2.3%
1990	37,670		2.2%
2000	38,390		1.9%
2010	37,234		−3.0%
2020	38,640		3.8%
U.S. Decennial Census; 1860–1870 1880-1890; 1900 1910 1920; 1930 1940 1950; 1960 1970 1980; 1990 2000 2010; 2020

=== Racial and ethnic composition ===
Pacifica city, California – Racial and ethnic composition Note: the US Census treats Hispanic/Latino as an ethnic category. This table excludes Latinos from the racial categories and assigns them to a separate category. Hispanics/Latinos may be of any race.
Race / Ethnicity (NH = Non-Hispanic)	Pop 2000	Pop 2010	Pop 2020	% 2000	% 2010	% 2020
White alone (NH)	23,549	20,703	18,742	61.34%	55.60%	48.50%
Black or African American alone (NH)	1,219	902	684	3.18%	2.42%	1.77%
Native American or Alaska Native alone (NH)	123	123	100	0.32%	0.33%	0.26%
Asian alone (NH)	5,765	7,045	8,186	15.02%	18.92%	21.19%
Native Hawaiian or Pacific Islander alone (NH)	247	285	258	0.64%	0.77%	0.67%
Other race alone (NH)	119	155	363	0.31%	0.42%	0.94%
Mixed race or Multiracial (NH)	1,759	1,778	2,944	4.58%	4.78%	7.62%
Hispanic or Latino (any race)	5,609	6,243	7,363	14.61%	16.77%	19.06%
Total	38,390	37,234	38,640	100.00%	100.00%	100.00%

=== 2020 census ===
As of the 2020 census, Pacifica had a population of 38,640. The population density was 3,070.8 inhabitants per square mile (1,185.6/km^{2}). The median age was 42.7 years. The age distribution was 19.0% under the age of 18, 6.7% aged 18 to 24, 27.5% aged 25 to 44, 28.5% aged 45 to 64, and 18.3% who were 65 years of age or older. For every 100 females, there were 97.0 males, and for every 100 females age 18 and over, there were 94.8 males age 18 and over.

The census reported that 99.6% of the population lived in households, 0.2% lived in non-institutionalized group quarters, and 0.2% were institutionalized. Additionally, 99.9% of residents lived in urban areas, while 0.1% lived in rural areas.

There were 14,180 households, out of which 30.7% included children under the age of 18, 54.6% were married-couple households, 7.0% were cohabiting couple households, 23.3% had a female householder with no partner present, and 15.1% had a male householder with no partner present. 20.9% of households were one person, and 10.0% were one person aged 65 or older. The average household size was 2.72. There were 10,050 families (70.9% of all households).

There were 14,652 housing units at an average density of 1,164.4 units per square mile (449.6 units/km^{2}), of which 14,180 (96.8%) were occupied. Of these, 67.8% were owner-occupied, and 32.2% were occupied by renters. The homeowner vacancy rate was 0.4% and the rental vacancy rate was 3.2%.

Racial composition as of the 2020 census
Race	Number	Percent
White	20,488	53.0%
Black or African American	738	1.9%
American Indian and Alaska Native	307	0.8%
Asian	8,385	21.7%
Native Hawaiian and Other Pacific Islander	286	0.7%
Some other race	2,425	6.3%
Two or more races	6,011	15.6%

=== 2023 ACS 5-year estimates ===
In 2023, the US Census Bureau estimated that 21.9% of the population were foreign-born. Of all people aged 5 or older, 73.4% spoke only English at home, 9.0% spoke Spanish, 4.3% spoke other Indo-European languages, 12.2% spoke Asian or Pacific Islander languages, and 1.1% spoke other languages. Of those aged 25 or older, 95.5% were high school graduates and 48.5% had a bachelor's degree.

The median household income in 2023 was $156,819, and the per capita income was $69,917. About 4.2% of families and 6.2% of the population were below the poverty line.

=== 2010 census ===
At the 2010 census Pacifica had a population of 37,234. The population density was 2,941.1 inhabitants per square mile (1,135.6/km^{2}). The racial makeup of Pacifica was 55.6% white, 16.8% (6,243) Hispanic or Latino of any race, 976 (2.6%) African American, 206 (0.6%) Native American, 7,230 (19.4%) Asian, 315 (0.8%) Pacific Islander, 1,703 (4.6%) from other races, and 2,638 (7.1%) from two or more races.

The census reported that 37,052 people (99.5% of the population) lived in households, 64 (0.2%) lived in non-institutionalized group quarters, and 118 (0.3%) were institutionalized.

There were 13,967 households, 4,511 (32.3%) had children under the age of 18 living in them, 7,385 (52.9%) were opposite-sex married couples living together, 1,592 (11.4%) had a female householder with no husband present, 709 (5.1%) had a male householder with no wife present. There were 869 (6.2%) unmarried opposite-sex partnerships, and 237 (1.7%) same-sex married couples or partnerships. 3,126 households (22.4%) were one person and 1,098 (7.9%) had someone living alone who was 65 or older. The average household size was 2.65. There were 9,686 families (69.3% of households); the average family size was 3.12.

The age distribution was 7,707 people (20.7%) under the age of 18, 2,842 people (7.6%) aged 18 to 24, 10,011 people (26.9%) aged 25 to 44, 12,155 people (32.6%) aged 45 to 64, and 4,519 people (12.1%) who were 65 or older. The median age was 41.5 years. For every 100 females, there were 95.6 males. For every 100 females age 18 and over, there were 93.4 males.

There were 14,523 housing units at an average density of 1,147.2 per square mile, of the occupied units 9,545 (68.3%) were owner-occupied and 4,422 (31.7%) were rented. The homeowner vacancy rate was 0.9%; the rental vacancy rate was 4.8%. 26,567 people (71.4% of the population) lived in owner-occupied housing units and 10,485 people (28.2%) lived in rental housing units.

=== 2000 census ===
At the 2000 census, the median income for a household in the city was $31,737, and the median family income was $48,361 (these figures had risen to $52,000 and $62,463 respectively as of a 2007 estimate). Males had a median income of $50,761 versus $40,261 for females. The per capita income for the city was $30,183. About 1.2% of families and 2.9% of the population were below the poverty line, including 1.2% of those under age 18 and 4.9% of those age 65 or over.

The oldest person to ever live in Pacifica is Rose G. Rosenthal who was born on April 8, 1901, and died December 27, 2008.

The Reverend Herschell Harkins Memorial pier was constructed in 1973 and was designed to carry sewage piping out to sea. It was closed in 1992 due to corrosion of some of the structure. Since then the pier has been repaired and is a well known fishing spot; on July 8–9, 1995, over 1,000 salmon were caught from the pier.

== Economy ==
=== Top employers ===
According to the city's 2019 Comprehensive Annual Financial Report, the top employers in the city are:

Rank	Employer	No. of Employees
1	Pacifica School District	499
2	City of Pacifica	282
3	Safeway	262
4	Jefferson Union High School District	137
5	Oceana Market	55
6	Ace Hardware	36
7	Recology of the Coast	35
8	Rite Aid	34
9	Ross	31
10	North Coast County Water District	22

== Government ==
Governed by a city council of five elected members, with each council seat in turn serving as mayor for a one-year term. A city manager, city attorney and city clerk are appointed and serve in support of the council to enact the ordinances passed by the council, which meets biweekly on the second and fourth Mondays of the month.

=== Departments ===
The major City departments, ranked by cost:

- 32% - Police and Communication Services
- 23% - Fire and Emergency Services
- 6% - Development and Engineering
- 6% - Childcare programs
- 5% - City Attorney
- 5% - Public Works
- 5% - Parks, Beach & Recreation
- 5% - Finance and MIS

As of August 1, 2011, the South San Francisco Police Department took over the Pacifica emergency calls dispatch.

=== State and federal representation ===
In the California State Legislature, Pacifica is in the 13th senatorial district, represented by Democrat Josh Becker, and in the 23rd Assembly district, represented by Democrat Marc Berman.

In the United States House of Representatives, Pacifica is in California's 16th congressional district, represented by Democrat Sam Liccardo.

According to the California Secretary of State, as of February 10, 2019, Pacifica has 25,029 registered voters. Of those, 13,404 (53.6%) are registered Democrats, 3,290 (13.1%) are registered Republicans, and 7,154 (28.6%) have declined to state a political party.

== Culture ==
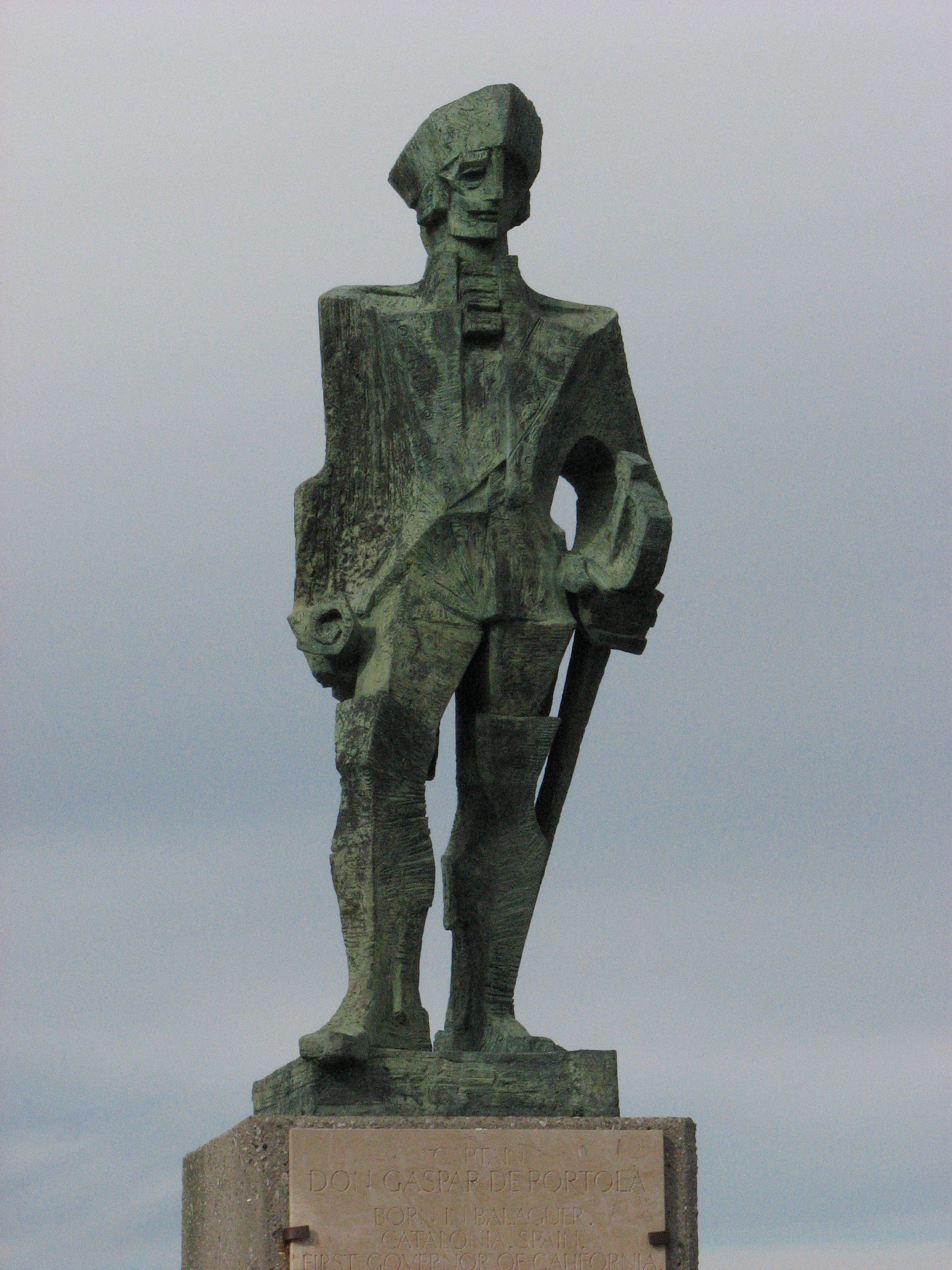
Statue of Gaspar de Portolá, first Governor of the Californias

Pacifica is well known regionally as a popular surfing destination. Surfers and families often visit Pacifica State Beach, also known as Linda Mar Beach. It is also the site of the World Dog Surfing Championships. Rockaway Beach is a scenic location and offers recreation, shopping and dining. Pacifica is also a popular place to hike, with many trails that wind along the beaches and bluffs, including Mori Point, San Pedro Valley County Park, Frontierland Park, the Sanchez Adobe, Milagra Ridge, and the privately owned Rockaway Quarry, and a popular mountain biking destination, with many trails crossing the hillsides that surround the city, including Pedro Mountain Road, Sweeney Ridge, and areas of the Golden Gate National Recreation Area. Fishermen frequent the local beaches and the Pacifica Pier, often catching striped bass and salmon. 2005 marked the opening of the top-ranked Pacifica Skatepark. Pacifica is also home to the Sharp Park Golf Course, which was designed in 1931 by architect Alister MacKenzie.

For live local theater and performing arts, Pacifica Spindrift Players is a local favorite, in addition to Pacifica Performances, which provides performing arts including musical presentations. The world class bromeliad nursery Shelldance Orchid Gardens, is located just off Highway 1 in Pacifica, adjacent to the Sweeney Ridge hiking trailhead. The Taco Bell Cantina at Pacifica, a 1960 building that is one of the few restaurants remaining on the west side of Highway 1, has a reputation as the most beautiful in the world.

== Media ==
The local weekly newspaper, the Pacifica Tribune, is mailed out every Wednesday. It is part of Coastside News Group, a locally owned California Benefit Corporation that includes the Half Moon Bay Review and Coastside Magazine. It originated as the Coastside Tribune early in the twentieth century.

Other media include:

- The San Mateo Daily Journal
- The Coastsider,
- Coastside Magazine, published by the award-winning Half Moon Bay Review,
- Pacificariptide,
- Peninsula Press - a project of Stanford_journalism.

Pacifica Community Television, Pacifica's Emmy Award-winning local public-access television cable TV channel 26, has continuously operated for 30 years, featuring community based television. On national television, Guy Fieri visited Gorilla BBQ for the fifth season of Diners, Drive-Ins and Dives in 2009.

The final scene of Harold and Maude in which Harold makes the leap off a cliff was filmed at Mori Point in Pacifica. The 2003 film House of Sand and Fog and the 2012 Chasing Mavericks were also filmed in Pacifica.

The 2007 National Book Award finalist Story of a Girl by Sara Zarr is set in Pacifica. In 2017, it was adapted into a Lifetime movie.

== Education ==
=== Primary and secondary schools ===
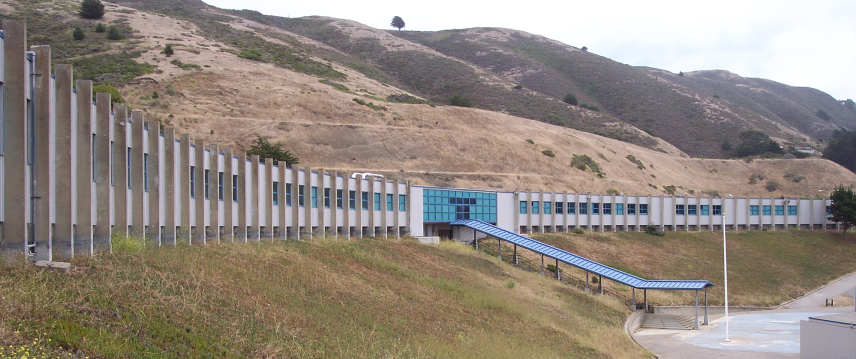
Oceana High School

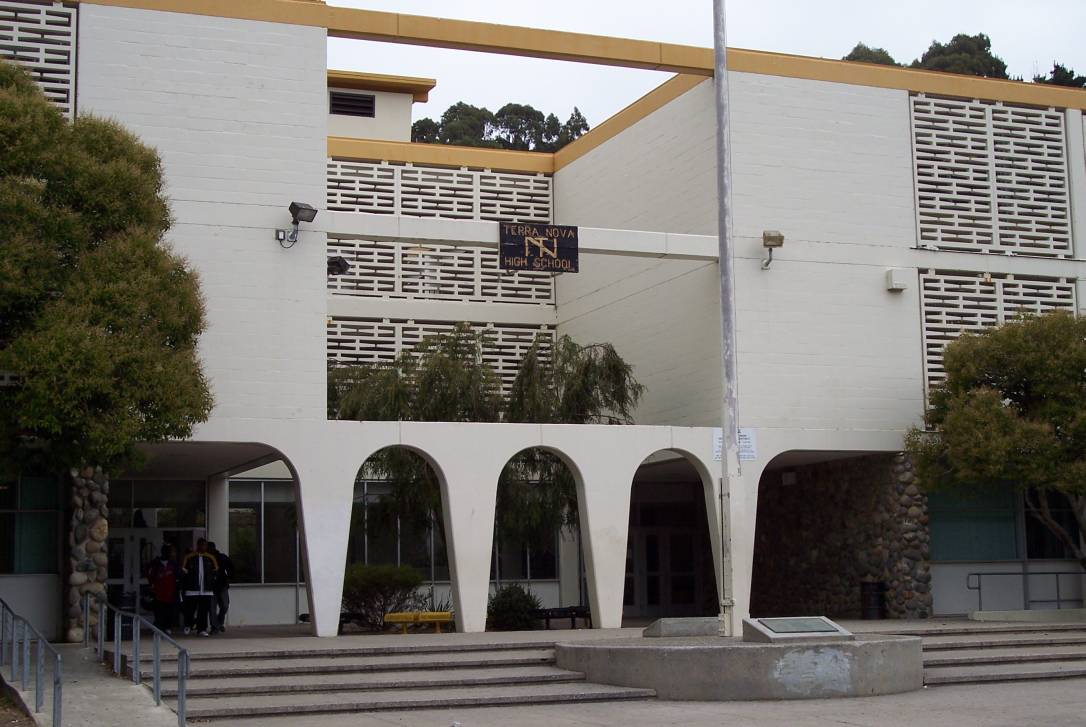
Terra Nova High School

The public elementary and middle school district, known as Pacifica School District, (formerly the Laguna Salada School District), consists of Vallemar, Cabrillo, Ingrid B. Lacy, Sunset Ridge, Ortega, Linda Mar and Ocean Shore schools, and also a home schooling program. The administration office is located at 375 Reina del Mar Avenue, adjacent to Vallemar School. Each school enrolls about 550–600 students.

There is one private K–8 school, Good Shepherd School, and one private 6-12 school, Pacific Bay Christian School. The latter was newly incorporated in 2018 to replace what had been founded as a segregation academy in 1955.

Pacifica has two public high schools which are part of the Jefferson Union High School District in addition to the one private high school. Oceana High School is in the central part of the city, while Terra Nova High School and Pacific Bay Christian School are in the south. Many students in the northern part of Pacifica attend Jefferson High School or Westmoor High School nearby in adjacent Daly City. Oceana's teaching paradigm is geared toward longer classes, senior exhibitions, and mandated community service. Much larger Terra Nova is a more traditional institution, featuring numerous sports, clubs, and a broad-based and enriching educational experience.

Pacifica also previously had an established elementary school from 1969 to 2005 known as Oddstad (Oddstad Andres) Elementary located in the Park Pacifica neighborhood. Though now non-operational, the campus site has been host to numerous community events, and private courses as well as sporting events and leisure.

=== Public libraries ===
San Mateo County Libraries, a member of the Peninsula Library System, operates the Pacifica-Sanchez Library and the Pacifica-Sharp Park Library.

== Notable people ==
- Chuy Campusano (1944–1997), Chicano muralist
- Anthony Gordon, former college football player for the Washington State Cougars and current free agent in the National Football League grew up in Pacifica.
- Keith Hernandez, MVP Baseball first baseman and World Series Champion for the St. Louis Cardinals and New York Mets.
- Kevin Kelly, founding executive editor of Wired magazine
- Derek Kirk Kim, Korean-American comics artist. His debut graphic novel Same Difference features scenes from Pacifica.
- Greg Reynolds, former MLB pitcher for the Colorado Rockies, as well as uncle of Anthony Gordon grew up in Pacifica, and had his start pitching for Terra Nova, and continued to Stanford University.
- Rob Schneider grew up in Pacifica. In 1997, he formed the Rob Schneider Music Foundation to support its school music program, and has since donated approximately $2 million.

== Sister city ==
- Balaguer, Catalonia, Spain

== See also ==
- Category:People from Pacifica, California
