= Shelter Cove, Pacifica, California =

Shelter Cove
- Beach
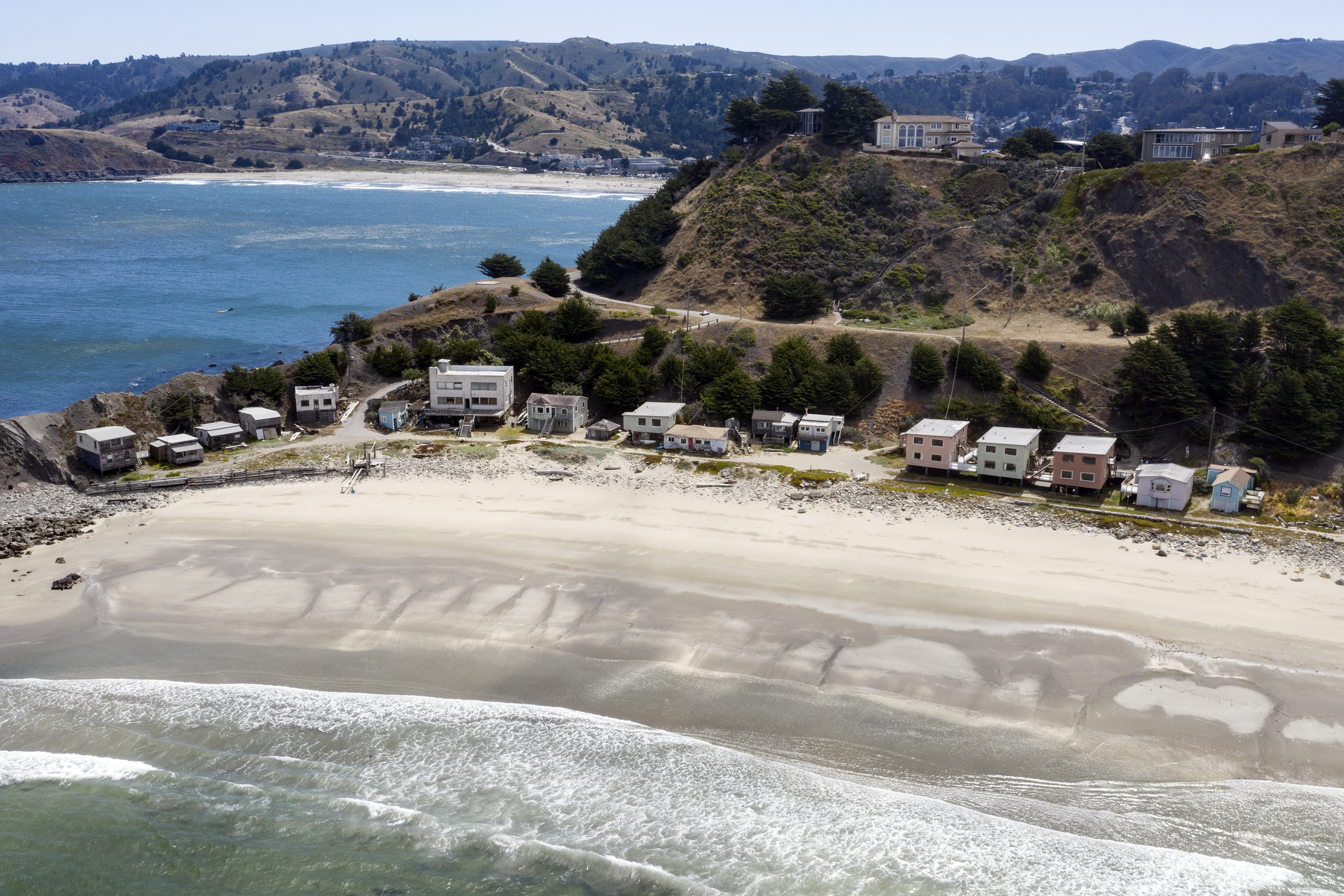
- Shelter Cove

- Location within San Francisco Bay Area Location within California Location within the United States
- Coordinates: 37°35′49″N 122°30′50″W
- Location: Pacifica, California, USA
- Elevation: 0 m

Shelter Cove is a 17-acre (6.9 ha) beach neighborhood at the southerly edge of Pacifica, California consisting of seventeen rustic rental cottages.

== Background ==
Historically the cove has been a recreational beach and popular San Francisco tourist destination. Shelter Cove was a picnic day stop along the Ocean Shore Railroad during its heyday, and later through the Prohibition Era up until the 1940s. A restaurant and bar, the Clipper Ship, operated at Shelter Cove for many years during this period. Ever since the access road washed out during a 1983 storm, this neighborhood and beach is accessible only by footpath or boat.

The Shelter Cove beach has been a center of attention as result of a public beach access prescriptive easement complaint lodged with the California Coastal Commission. On March 19, 2008, the City of Pacifica filed a court action to force the maintenance of the footpath and hillside from risk of landslide. On January 20, 2009, the planning commission of Pacifica gave permission to current owner Arno Rohloff to repair a staircase to the property since the footpath has fallen completely into the sea.

Shelter Cove is currently owned by Arno Rohloff since July 1997, with prior owners from the 1960s until 1975 were Charles (Chuck) Pavka and Mary (Maty) Pavka.
