= Oceana High School (California) =

High school in California, USA

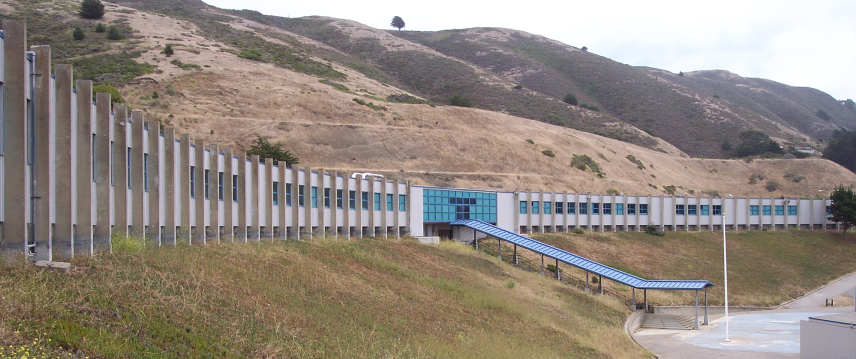

Location
- 401 Paloma Avenue; Pacifica, California 94044; United States; 37.638662°N 122.487222°W

Information
- Type: Public high school
- Established: 1962
- School district: Jefferson Union High School District
- CEEB code: 052308
- Principal: Maritza Torres
- Teaching staff: 29.66 (FTE)
- Enrollment: 491 (2023–2024)
- Student to teacher ratio: 16.55
- Campus: Suburban
- Colors: Red, white and blue
- Team name: Sharks
- Website: ohs.juhsd.net

Oceana High School is a small public high school in northern Pacifica, California. Offering an alternative college preparatory program, the school serves just over 600 students in grades nine through twelve. The school is one of five public schools in the Jefferson Union High School District. According to the State of California, Oceana is one of the twenty-five most diverse high schools in the state.

== History ==
Oceana High School opened in 1962. The school is a member of the Coalition of Essential Schools and is accredited by the Western Association of Schools and Colleges. Located in northern Pacifica, Oceana High School currently serves students from Pacifica, Daly City, Brisbane, and Colma.

The school has appeared in popular culture. Director Curtis Hanson selected Oceana High School as the setting for the fictional Ocean High School in his 2012 film Chasing Mavericks. After multiple days of filming on site, Oceana High School appeared in the film, which was ultimately a commercial and critical failure.

== Campus ==
The school was designed by architect Mario J. Ciampi to conform to the hillside at the base of Milagra Ridge.

A 2002 modernization included a seismic upgrade, ocean facing classroom windows and a 350-seat theatre.

== Demographics ==
White	Latino	Asian	African American	Pacific Islander	American Indian	Two or More Races
22%	24%	42%	1%	0.5%	0.3%	9%

According to U.S. News & World Report, 78% of Oceana's student body is "of color," with 31% of the student body coming from an economically disadvantaged household, determined by student eligibility for California's Reduced-price meal program.

== Academics ==
=== Class schedule ===
Oceana uses a form of block scheduling. Every student has, in total, six class periods, and that the student only has three periods per day. So, on one day, students have an "odd" day, periods 1, 3, and 5. The next day would be an "even" day, periods 2, 4, and 6. For example, if a student had mathematics as period number 2, they would only have that class every other day, on "even" days. However, in past years Oceana had what is called modular scheduling. This type of scheduling allowed for many free periods during the day. These "free mods" could go to as long as 180 min of continuous free time without classes. This time could be utilized for lunch, study, or socializing. Due to the latter, students were advised to spend most of their free time in study so that such time was not wasted or misused.

=== Curriculum ===
The curriculum at Oceana is generally project based. The class periods are 90 minutes each, so this gives the students time to work on projects, especially for English and History.

Oceana offers Advanced Placement courses in US History, Chemistry, US Government, Language and Composition, Literature, and Calculus AB.

=== Standardized testing ===
In 2013, Oceana High School scored an 817 on the California API, the highest in the Jefferson Union High School District by a difference of +25 points. According to U.S. News & World Report, Oceana is a nationally academically ranked high school, and the 354th best in the state of California, the highest ranking of any school in the district.

SAT Scores for 2013–2014
	Critical reading average	Math average	Writing average
Oceana High School	516	554	516
Jefferson Union District	503	536	500
San Mateo County	546	576	548
Statewide	492	506	489
