= Mario J. Ciampi =

American architect

Mario Joseph Ciampi
- Born: April 27, 1907; San Francisco, California
- Died: July 6, 2006 (aged 99); San Rafael, California
- Occupation: Architect
- Awards: 1959 and 1961 American Institute of Architects
- Practice: M.J.C. and Associates
- Buildings: Berkeley Art Museum (now Woo Hon Fai Hall), 1970

Mario Joseph Ciampi (April 27, 1907 – July 6, 2006) was an American architect and urban planner best known for his modern design influence on public spaces and buildings in the San Francisco Bay Area.

== Early life and education ==
Ciampi's parents emigrated from Italy to California in 1906. Guido and Palmira Ciampi travelled on the SS Deutschland from Genoa, arriving at Ellis Island, New York on 3 March 1906. They had friends in San Francisco and arrived there just in time for the great San Francisco earthquake of April 18. The devastation caused by the earthquake and subsequent fire forced them to live in an Army issue tent on the Presidio for several months. Mario was born in San Francisco twelve months after the fire, on 27 April 1907.

Soon afterwards the family moved to Schellville, California near Sonoma, where Guido became a farmer. The farm had vegetables, fruit trees, animals, and a vineyard which eventually earned bonded winery status. As teenagers, Mario with his brothers Paul and Joe worked on the family vineyard and made extra money making wooden shipping crates for the neighboring Sebastiani Winery.

Despite early signs of talent, Mario could not afford architecture school. Instead, after high school he did an apprenticeship as a draftsman in the San Francisco firm of Alexander Cantin and Dodge A. Riedy, who had worked on the Pacific Telephone Building with Timothy L. Pflueger, from 1925–29. He also took night classes at the San Francisco Architectural Club from 1927–29. He won two National Design Competition scholarships to the Harvard Graduate School of Design, where he was admitted in 1931 and 1932 under special circumstances, because he had no bachelor's degree. After Harvard, he studied at the Ecole des Beaux-Arts for two years and toured Europe before returning to San Francisco.

== Career ==
Ciampi founded his design firm, M.J.C. and Associates, in 1945. Professional works of Mario Ciampi include the design and construction of university buildings, schools, churches, and commercial buildings, including joint ventures with architectural organizations and collaboration with painters, sculptors and artists.

=== Structures ===
In the late 1950s and 1960s, Ciampi designed numerous schools in the Bay Area. They include Westmoor School, Fernando Rivera Elementary School, and Vista Mar School in Daly City; and Sonoma Elementary School for Ciampi's hometown of Sonoma. The American Institute of Architects described them as "characterized by novel structural systems integrating clerestory lighting, leaving large wall surfaces that incorporate significant artwork in relief."

Ciampi designed the streamlined concrete overpasses for the section of Interstate 280 between San Francisco and Cupertino, which was constructed in the mid-1960s.

Perhaps Ciampi's best known work is the original Berkeley Art Museum building, which was opened in 1970 at the University of California, Berkeley campus in a brutalist style. The building was renamed Woo Hon Fai Hall in 2011. The museum moved out in 2014, and the building was renovated in 2022 and now houses the Bakar BioEnginuity Hub. The City of Berkeley declared it to be a landmark in 2012.

=== Urban planning ===
Ciampi was commissioned to develop the Downtown Plan for San Francisco in 1963, including beautification of Market Street, Embarcadero, Hallidie, and United Nations Plazas. Much of his work was completed under the administrations of Christopher, Shelley, Alioto, Moscone, and Feinstein.

Ciampi was the urban design consultant for the Golden Gateway, Embarcadero Plaza, Rockefeller Center, Fisherman's Wharf, Yerba Buena Center, and a freeway study for San Francisco with the California Department of Transportation. He developed the master plans for the University of Alaska, Fairbanks, and St. Mary's College in Moraga, California.

== Death ==
Ciampi died age 99 on July 6, 2006, of heart failure in San Rafael, California. He was survived by his wife, Carolyn Ciampi of Kentfield, and his nephew, Norman Ciampi of Novato.

== Awards ==
In 1959, Ciampi received two honor awards from the American Institute of Architects, out of five awards given during that year. "San Francisco architect Mario J. Ciampi's two schools, the Sonoma Elementary School in Sonoma and the Westmoor High School, Daly City [were] named among five buildings to get First Honor Awards from the American Institute of Architects. He was the only architect to get two top winners and the only one from Northern California to be named in this category or in the Awards of Merit." The cover of Fortune magazine October 1958 featured one of Mario Ciampi's award-winning schools.

Ciampi won the AIA honor award for the Junipero Serra Overpass for Highway 280 near San Francisco, CA.

Ciampi won AIACC's 25-Year Award in 1996 for the Berkeley Art Museum. The AIACC also awarded Ciampi their Maybeck Award in 2000 recognizing his entire body of work.

Mario Ciampi received the National Award AIA for construction of plazas and beautification of Market Street, San Francisco. Additionally, he received a Certificate of Appreciation from the Board of Supervisors for the Urban development of Market Street. He received the first Albert J. Exers Award for Urban Design, San Francisco and was the winner of the San Francisco Art Festival Prize with a lifetime exhibition in 1970.

== Education ==
Ciampi's education in the field of architecture included:

- 1927-29: San Francisco Architectural Club (night college)
- 1925-29: Apprentice draftsman with Alexander Cantin and Dodge A. Riedy, Architects, San Francisco
- 1930-32: Harvard University Graduate School of Architecture. Ciampi won two National Design Competition Scholarships to Harvard in 1930 and 1931.
- 1932-33: Studied Architecture at Beaux-Arts Institute of Design, Paris, France
- 1935: Received certificate to practice architecture in State of California

== Works ==
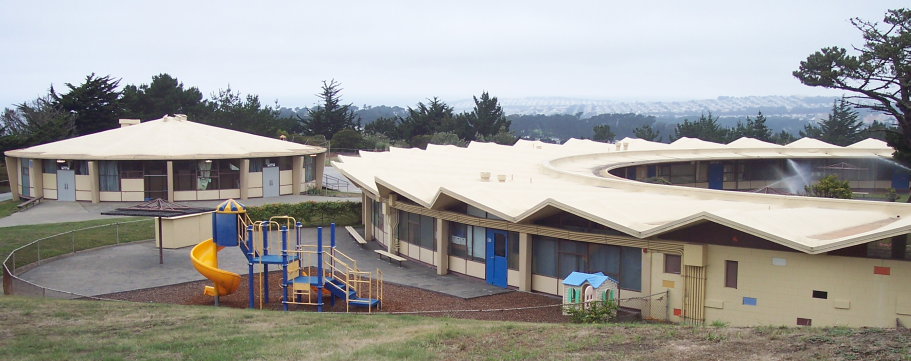
Marjorie H. Tobias Elementary School, Daly City, California

- Lawton School (1940) San Francisco, California
- Cresta Auto Parts Building (1948) San Francisco, California (Demolished)
- Mission Street Mixed Use Building (1948) San Francisco, California
- Mission Street Commercial Building (1949) San Francisco, California
- All Souls Catholic School (1949) San Francisco, California
- Corpus Christi Catholic Church (1952) San Francisco, California
- Sassarini Elementary School (1952) Sonoma, California
- San Miguel School Addition (1953) San Francisco, California
- Olympia School (1954) Daly City, California (now Doelger Art Center)
- War Memorial Community Center (Circa 1955) Daly City, California (Demolished)
- Westmoor High School (1956) Daly City, California (with landscape architect Lawrence Halprin).
- Vista Grande School (1958) Daly City, California (Demolished)
- Marjorie H. Tobias (Vista Mar) Elementary School (1958) Daly City, California.
- Fernando Rivera Elementary School (1960) Daly City, California (now Doelger Center)
- Oceana High School (1962) Pacifica, California
- St. Peter's Church (1964) Pacifica, California (Demolished)
- Interstate 280 between San Francisco and San Jose, California, including the Doran Memorial Bridge near Hillsborough (1963-1967)
- Newman Hall Holy Spirit Parish (1967) Berkeley, California
- Woo Hon Fai Hall (houses the UC Berkeley Bakar Bioenginuity Hub, previously the Berkeley Art Museum and Pacific Film Archive) (1970) Berkeley, California (renovated by MBH Architects in 2022)
- Justin Herman Plaza (1971) San Francisco, California (with architects Don Carter, John Bolles and Lawrence Halprin)
- Hallidie Plaza (1973) San Francisco, California (with architects John Carl Warnecke and Lawrence Halprin)
- United Nations Plaza (1975) San Francisco, California (with architects John Carl Warnecke and Lawrence Halprin)
