= Bayshore Elementary School District =

School district in California, United States

Address
- 155 Oriente Street Daly City, California, 94014; United States

District information
- Type: Public
- Grades: K–8
- NCES District ID: 0604200

Students and staff
- Students: 361
- Teachers: 18.4 (FTE)
- Staff: 29.2
- Student–teacher ratio: 19.62

Other information
- Website: www.thebayshoreschool.org

Bayshore Elementary School District is a small school district located in the northeastern corner of San Mateo County, California, United States, consisting of one PreK-8 school, Bayshore Elementary. The school district is located in the former town of Bayshore, which disincorporated and was later annexed to the city of Daly City.

The unincorporated Bayshore Sanitary District of San Mateo County was annexed to Daly City in the early 1960s. At the time there were three public schools in the area:

- Bayshore Elementary School K-4
- Midway Village School K-2 in the Naval Housing Project (closed in 1989)
- Garnet Robertson Intermediate School 3–8 (It is closed)

Until 2017 the Bayshore Elementary School served 375 students in grades TK-4 and Robertson Intermediate served students in grades 5–8. Robertson Intermediate closed at the end of the 2016–2017 school year and the students were moved to Bayshore's campus.

The district does not serve high school students, as it is part of the larger Jefferson Union High School District (JUHSD), which serves the cities of Daly City, Brisbane, Pacifica, and the town of Colma.
