= Pacifica Pier =

Fishing pier in Pacifica, California, US

- Pacifica Pier
- Type: Fishing Pier
- Spans: Pacific Ocean
- Location: Pacifica, California
- Coordinates: 37.6333°N 122.4943°W
- Official name: Rev. Herschell Harkins Memorial Pacifica Pier
- Maintained by: City of Pacifica
- Toll: Open to the Public

Characteristics
- Construction: Concrete
- Total length: 1,140 feet (350 m)

History
- Opening date: November 1973
- Closure date: June 4, 2026

Pacifica Pier is a fishing pier in Pacifica, in western San Mateo County, California. The L-shaped pier juts out into the Pacific Ocean for a quarter mile from the City of Pacifica. Its official name is the Rev. Herschell Harkins Memorial Pacifica Pier. It was indefinitely closed for repairs until funding can be found in June 2026.

== History ==
The quarter-mile pier was built in 1973 as part of the city of Pacifica's sewer system. It carries a 28-inch (710 mm) pipe that continues a quarter mile offshore through which treated wastewater was pumped into the Pacific Ocean. This ended with the creation of a new water treatment facility in 2004.

The pier has been closed on occasion for both repairs (1993) and during high surf. On June 4, 2026 a substantial crack in the concrete walkway along the pier necessitated the closure of the entire structure and the demolition of its café. It is closed indefinitely until funding for repairs is secured.

In late August 2026, the city of Pacifica approved a plan to stabilize the structure, while awaiting confirmation of funding from the California Governor's Office of Emergency Services and the city's insurer.

Picture of the Pacifica Pier in September 2026, after a crack damaged the structure and its café was demolished

=== Funding sources ===
The pier was built as a cooperative development of the City of Pacifica, the Wildlife Conservation Board and the California Department of Fish and Game. The Pier Repair Project is funded in part by a grant from the California Coastal Conservancy. The pier is operated by the Department of Parks, Beaches and Recreation of the city of Pacifica, California.

== Fishing ==
Since 2004, the pier's primary purpose has been for fishing and crabbing. The pier is famous for salmon runs where hundreds of salmon are caught in a single day. When this occurs, there is a frenzy of activity where every available space is used to catch fish and hundreds of anglers are fishing shoulder to shoulder.

Primary species caught at the pier:

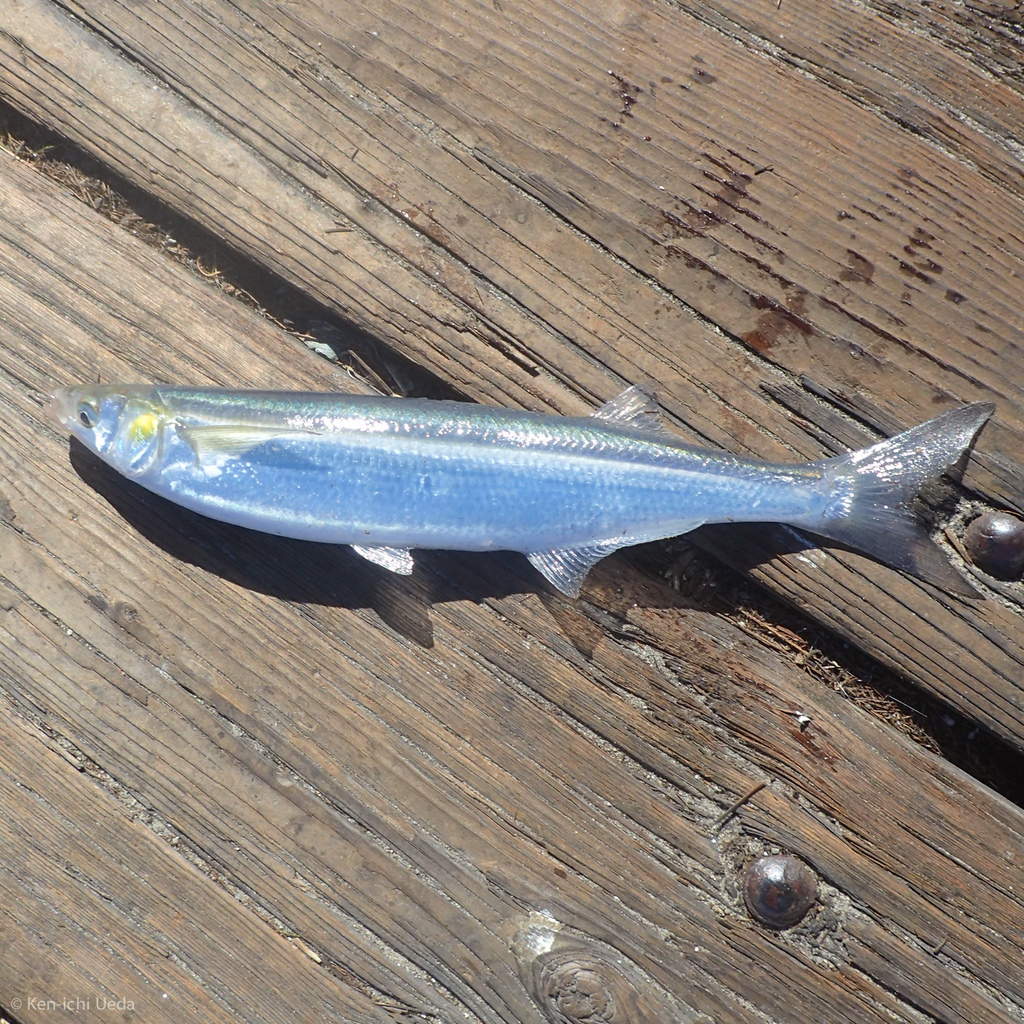
Jacksmelt

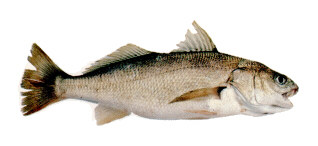
White croaker

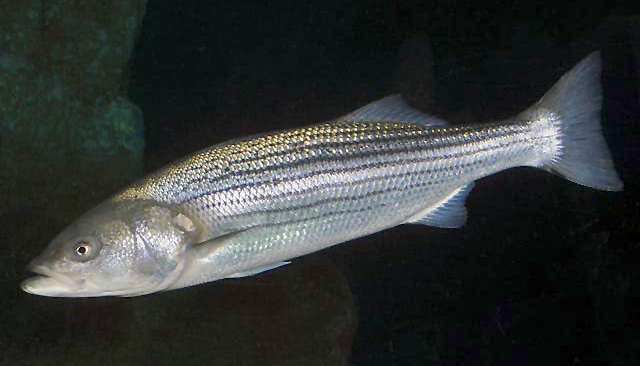
Striped bass

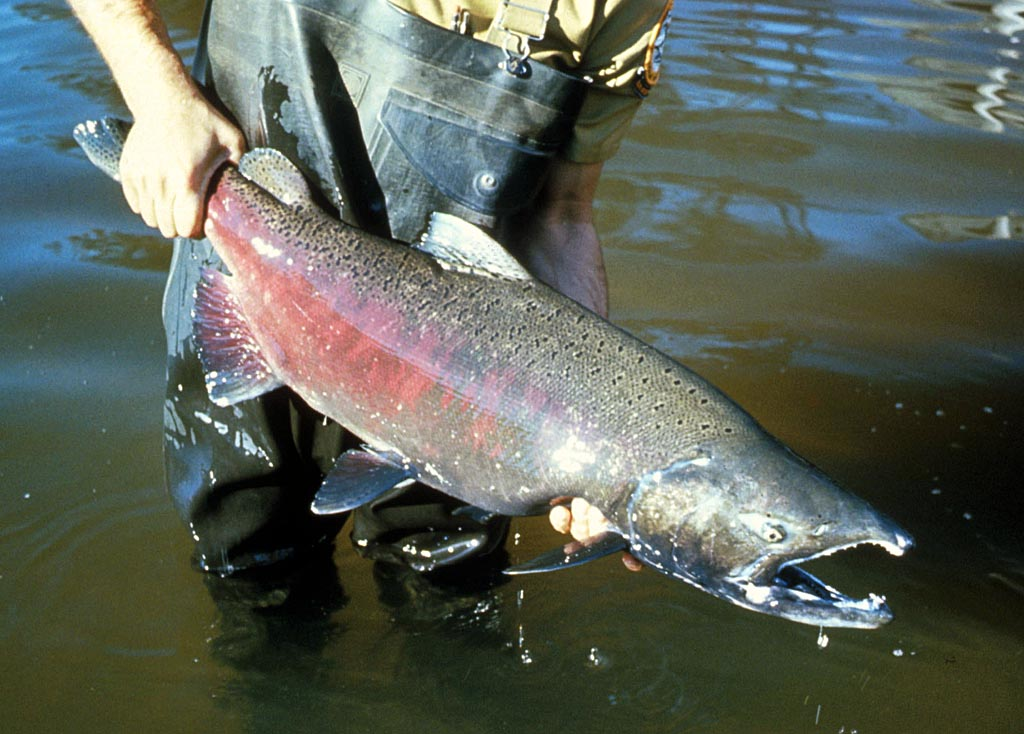
Chinook salmon

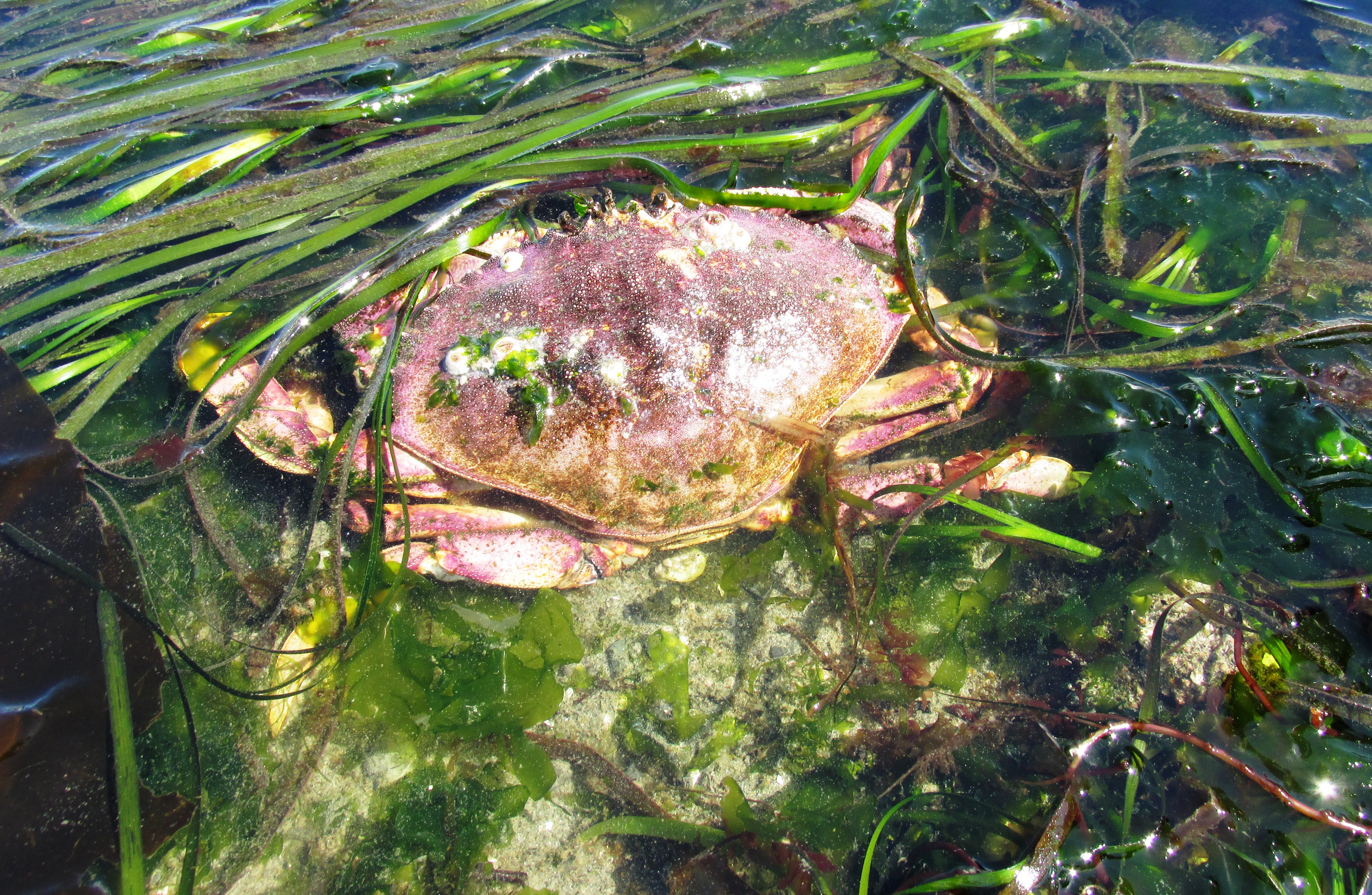
Dungeness crab

== Other recreation ==
The pier is a good place from which to view whales during their biannual migration.
