= Pacifica School District =

School district in California, United States

Address
- 375 Reina del Mar Avenue Pacifica, California, 94044; United States

District information
- Type: Public
- Grades: K–8
- NCES District ID: 0620460

Students and staff
- Students: 3,006 (2020–2021)
- Teachers: 136.1 (FTE)
- Staff: 117.56 (FTE)
- Student–teacher ratio: 22.09:1

Other information
- Website: www.pacificasd.org

Pacifica School District is a public school district in Pacifica, California, US.

Pacifica consists of one middle school, three K–8 elementary schools, two K–5 elementary schools, and the Linda Mar Educational Center. It currently serves over 3,100 students.

== Schools ==
=== Middle schools ===
- Ingrid B. Lacy Middle School

=== Elementary schools K–8 ===
- Cabrillo School

=== Elementary schools K–5 ===
- Ortega Elementary School
- Sunset Ridge/Ocean Shore School ("co-located")
- Vallemar School

=== Other ===
- Linda Mar Educational Center
