= Grafton Inn =

- U.S. National Register of Historic Places
- U.S. Historic district – Contributing property
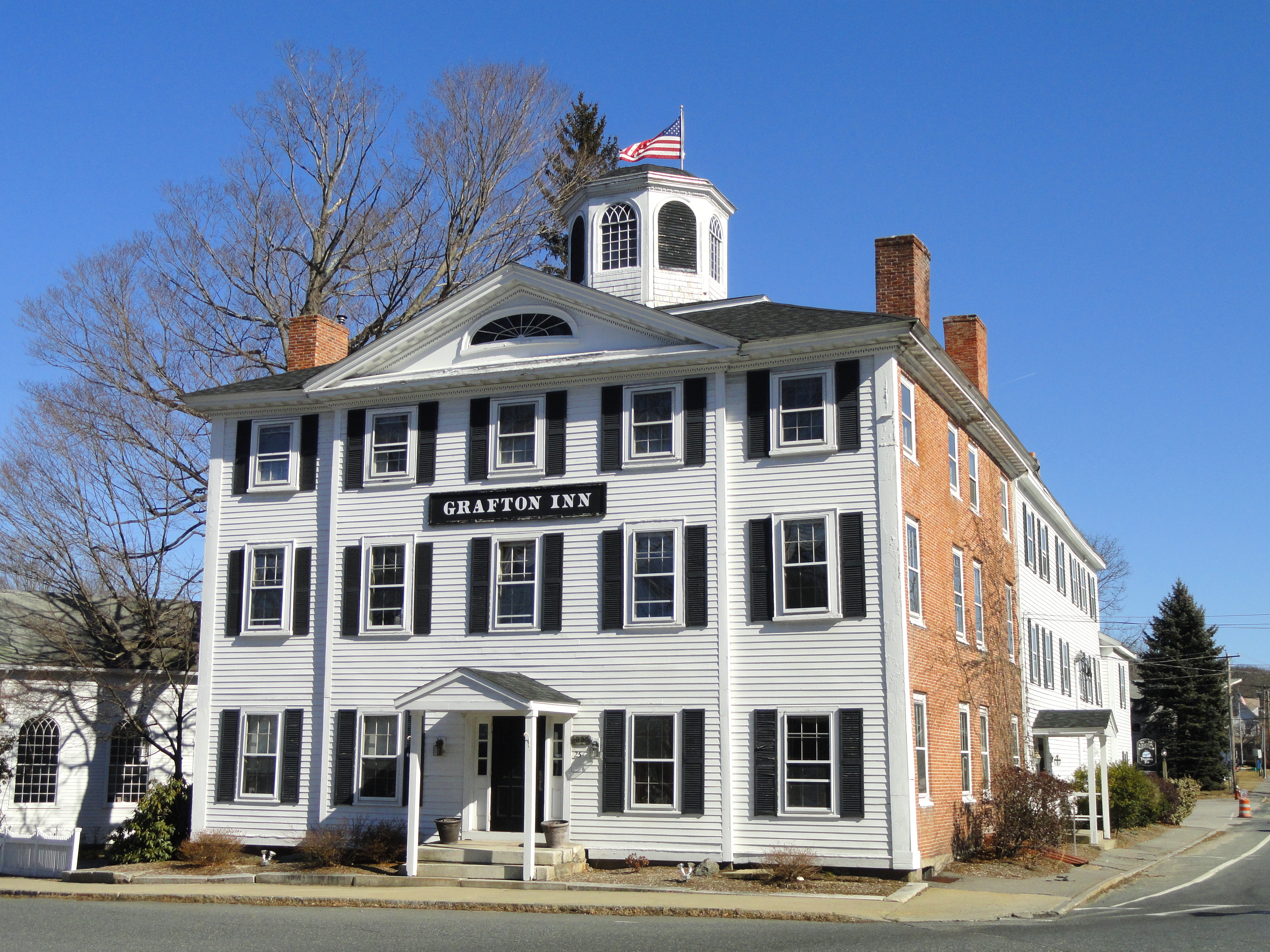
- Grafton Inn

- Location within Massachusetts Location within the United States
- Location: Grafton, Massachusetts
- Coordinates: 42°12′23″N 71°41′8″W
- Built: 1805
- Architect: Samuel Wood
- Architectural style: Federal
- Part of: Grafton Common Historic District (ID88000707)
- NRHP reference No.: 80001675

Significant dates
- Added to NRHP: June 16, 1980
- Designated CP: June 22, 1988

The Grafton Inn is a historic inn at 25 Grafton Common in Grafton, Massachusetts, United States. The three-story wood-and-brick building was built in 1805 by Samuel Wood, with a design influenced by the work of Charles Bulfinch. The building was significantly enlarged c. 1865–75, doubling its size and adding the Italianate front porch. It is a wood-frame structure, with brick ends, a hip roof, and cupola-like belvedere.

The inn was listed on the National Register of Historic Places in 1980, and was included in the Grafton Common Historic District in 1988. It is still in operation as a restaurant, bar, and seven-room inn.

== See also ==
- National Register of Historic Places listings in Worcester County, Massachusetts
