= Grafton Common Historic District =

Historic district in Massachusetts, United States

- U.S. National Register of Historic Places
- U.S. Historic district
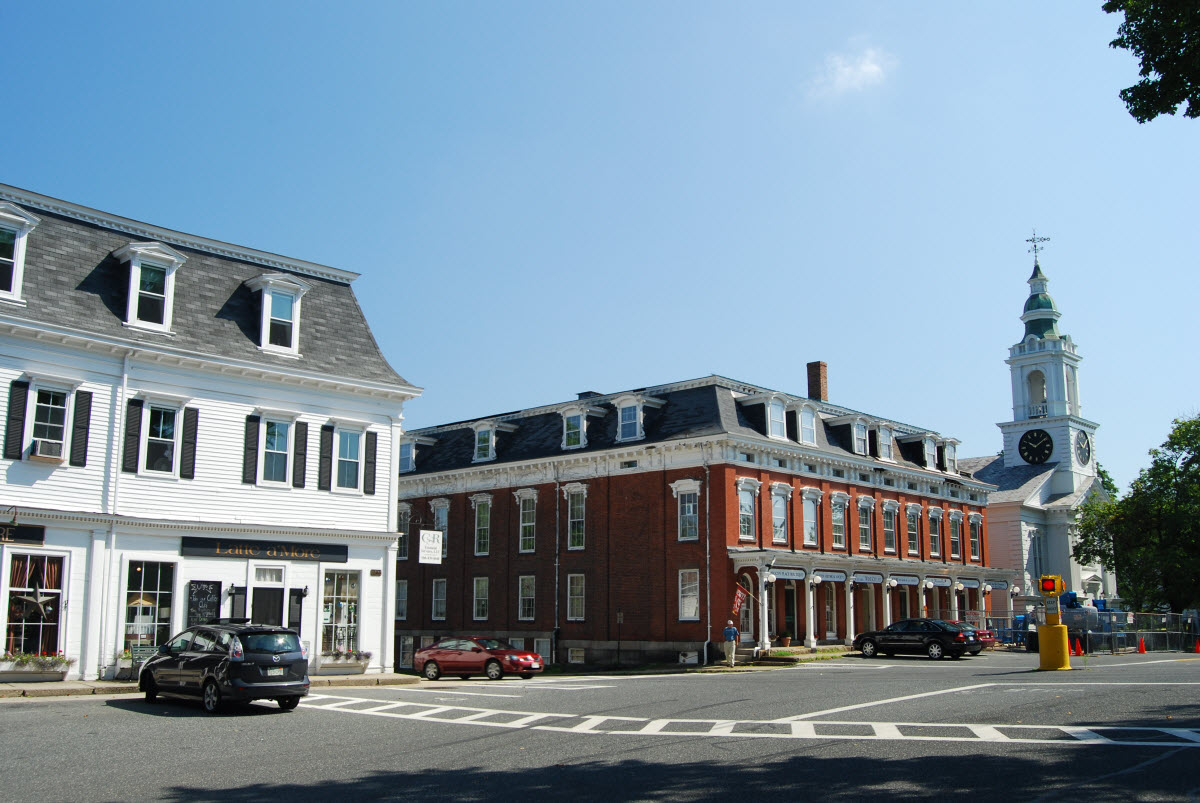

- Location within Massachusetts Location within the United States
- Location: Grafton, Massachusetts
- Coordinates: 42°12′22″N 71°41′10″W
- Architectural style: Greek Revival, Late Victorian, Federal
- NRHP reference No.: 88000707
- Added to NRHP: June 22, 1988

The Grafton Common Historic District encompasses the historic village center of Grafton, Massachusetts. The center consists of a number of buildings arrayed around a roughly oval common, which were mostly built in the middle of the 19th century. Later development was significantly reduced because the area was bypassed by the railroads. The common was laid out in 1728, when the area was first settled by colonists, and is enclosed by an 1845 fence built out of granite posts and wooden rails. Prominent buildings surrounding the common include the 1863 Italianate Unitarian Church, the 1833 Greek Revival Congregational Church, and the 1805 Federal style Grafton Inn.

The district was added to the National Register of Historic Places in 1988.

== See also ==
- National Register of Historic Places listings in Worcester County, Massachusetts
