= Mike Guingona =

American politician

Michael P. Guingona
- In office 1993–2018
- Preceded by: Carol L. Klatt

Personal details
- Born: 1962 (age 63–64) San Francisco, California, U.S.
- Party: Democratic
- Education: Skyline College; University of California, Los Angeles (BA); University of San Francisco School of Law (JD)

Michael Patrick Guingona (born 1962), also known as Mike Guingona, is an American politician who served as a Councilmember for the city of Daly City, California from 1993 to 2018, including several terms as Mayor. He is an attorney in private practice. He was first elected as a Daly City Council member in 1993 and became the youngest mayor at age 33 in 1995. He was elected as a City Council member four times.

Guingona was the first Filipino American elected to the City Council of Daly City. The year 2005 marked his fourth term as Mayor of Daly City.

Guingona also hosted the TV shows Citizen Pinoy and Pinagmulan on The Filipino Channel or TFC which shows on cable TV.

== Biography and career ==
=== Early life ===
Guingona was born in San Francisco, California, to Jose Tayko Guingona, a brother of Teofisto Guingona Jr. and Concepcion Tobias Limjap but moved to Daly City in 1965 at the age of 3. He grew up in Daly City and attended the Daly City Public Schools from K-12. He graduated from Westmoor High School where, during his senior year, he was elected class president. Guingona participated in, football, swimming, track, and wrestling in high school.

Gunigona's great-grandfather, Galicano Apacible served as governor of Batangas, a province of the Philippines.

Guingona attended Skyline College for two years where he continued wrestling before attending the University of California at Los Angeles where he earned a B.A. in History. When he returned to Daly City, he went to the University of San Francisco Law School to pursue his Juris Doctor. He graduated in 1989 and was admitted to the State Bar of California in the same year. He established his own private practice in 1999 in San Francisco, specializing in criminal defence.

=== Political career ===
Guingona first ran for office in 1992, when he came in 5th in a field of 12. He has since served several terms on council and four terms as mayor. His first successful campaign was viewed as a significant event in the Bay Area and by the broader Filipino American community, as he was the first Filipino American elected to City Council in Daly City, a city often referred to "Little Manila," due to its large population of immigrants form the Philippines. Guingona, who speaks English with a foreign accent, ran an issues-oriented campaign appealing to citizens of all ethnic origins, and was criticized by some Filipino activists for "lack of Filipinoness." Guingona responded, "I don't even want to take any of the vestiges of the system in the Philippines and bring them here because they don't work here."

His colleagues in the City Council selected him to serve as Mayor in 1995. He was the youngest to serve as Mayor of Daly City at age 33. During his first term, he continued to work as a full-time Deputy Public Defender in the San Francisco Public Defender's Office. He left the Public Defender's Office in 1999 and established a private practice in San Francisco specializing in criminal defense. Guingona was elected to a second term as Mayor in 1997, a third in 2001, and a fourth term in 2005. In addition, when Guingona was not Mayor in 2005, served as the vice mayor.

The number of people living within city limits swelled from 40,000 to over 100,000 during Guingona's lifetime. By the year 2000, Filipino Americans accounted for nearly a third of the population. He chose not to run for re-election in 2018.

In addition to his duties as a City Council member, Guingona has served his community as a member of the San Mateo County (SMC) Transit District Board of Directors, which he chaired in 2001 and the San Mateo County Transportation Authority, which he chaired in 2003. He was defeated for his fourth term in 2007. He was also actively involved with the Sister City Committee and was instrumental in initiating the Daly City-Quezon City Sister City partnership.

=== Professional affiliations ===
Guingona's professional affiliations include the California Trial Lawyers Association, the State Bar of California, the Bar Association of San Francisco, the Filipino Bar Association of Northern California, and the California Public Defenders Association.

=== Television shows ===
Guingona co-hosted the program Citizen Pinoy on The Filipino Channel, which was launched in 2005 in the U.S. and the Philippines. He hosted for four seasons.

Guingona also hosted the show Pinagmulan on The Filipino Channel. This was a reality-TV show that helps Filipino Americans connect with their family and friends back in the Philippines. "Pinagmulán" means "origins" or specifically "where one came from" in Tagalog. The show aired both in the United States and in the Philippines. The show lasted 14 episodes in 2006.
