= Community Advocate Newspaper =

The Community Advocate
- Type: Newspaper
- Founder(s): Ed Bagdon and Arthur Surabian
- Publisher: David Bagdon
- Founded: 1974
- Website: https://www.communityadvocate.com/

The Community Advocate is a 50 year old independent newspaper that serves the communities of Westborough, Hudson, Marlborough, Northborough, Shrewsbury, Southborough and Grafton.

The Community Advocate was founded as The “Community Advertiser” by Ed Bagdon and Arthur Surabian in 1974 as a grocery circular. After the death of Ed Bagdon in 1984, his son David Bagdon took control of the publication.
