= PINAGMULAN: The Journey Home =

- Created by: Dave Guingona; Mike Guingona
- Starring: Mike Guingona
- Country of origin: United States
- No. of episodes: unknown

Production
- Running time: 48 minutes

Original release
- Network: The Filipino Channel
- Release: March 26, 2006

PINAGMULAN: The Journey Home (Origin: The Journey Home) was a reality television show that aired Sundays on TFC after TV Patrol.

The program was canceled after the first season due to its inflating budget.

== Premise ==
The premise of the show is to take people to the Philippines who have either never been there or have not been there in a very long time. The show documents its subjects' rediscovering their roots. The show's producers encourage their audience to write in their emails and letters to be the next subjects on future episodes. Any one of those viewers could become the next subject on PINAGMULAN: The Journey Home.

== Host ==
Pinagmulan is hosted by mayor of Daly City, California Mike Guingona. Guingona, a second generation Filipino-American who has worked for the last year and half on TFC's other hit show, CITIZEN PINOY.

== Posible ==
The show's theme, "Posible" is performed by the Filipino rock band, Rivermaya. It was the number one rock song in the country at the time of the show's debut.

It was also the theme song for the 2005 Southeast Asian Games and remains very popular.

== Special ==
Pingamulan's first official airdate was March 26, 2006 as a one-hour special. it featured the story of Carol from Daly City as she went to the Philippines for the first time in nearly 13 years. Carol was sent to her hometown of Cardona, Rizal to be reunited with her sister, Mae, who lives in their childhood home to this very day.

- A Cup of Grace (August 27, 2006)
- The Perfect Son (September 3, 2006)

== See also ==
- The Filipino Channel
- ABS-CBN
- ABS-CBN International
- Mike Guingona
- Rivermaya
