= Grafton Public Library =

Grafton Public Library may refer to:

- Grafton Public Library (Grafton, Massachusetts)
- Grafton Public Library (Grafton, North Dakota), a Carnegie library in North Dakota
- Grafton Public Library (Grafton, Vermont), listed on the National Register of Historic Places
