= Westmoor High School =

Public high school in Daly City, California, US

Coordinates: 37.683396°N 122.482442°W

- 131 Westmoor Avenue, Daly City, California; United States

Information
- Type: Public high school
- Established: 1956
- School district: Jefferson Union High School District
- Principal: Victor Zou
- Teaching staff: 61.61 (FTE)
- Enrollment: 1,256 (2023–2024)
- Student to teacher ratio: 20.39
- Campus: Suburban
- Colors: Green and white
- Mascot: Westmoor Ram
- Website: Official website

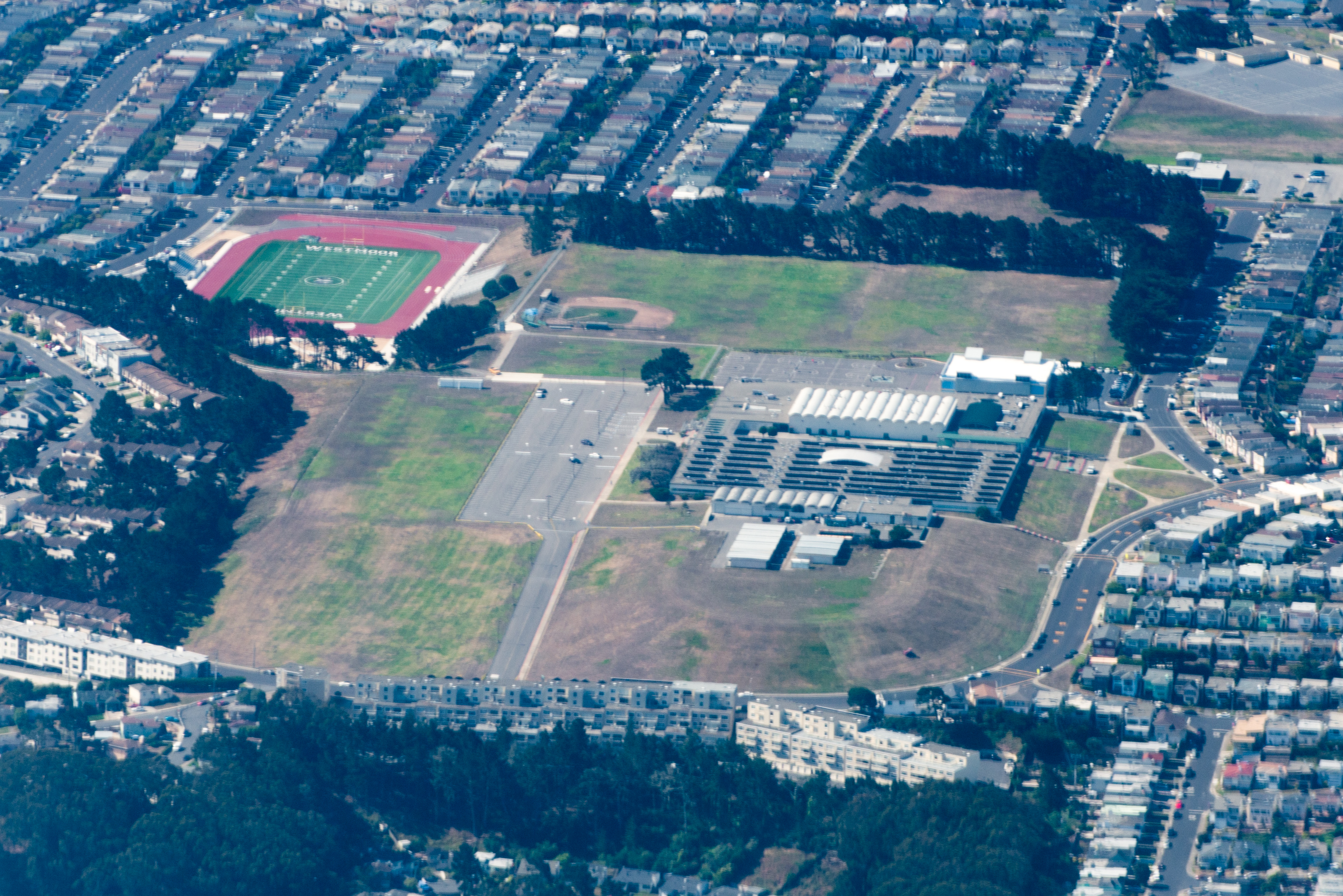
Aerial view of Westmoor High School and football stadium

Westmoor High School is a public high school in Daly City, California, United States. It serves grades 9 through 12 as part of the Jefferson Union High School District (JUHSD). It generally serves the residents of Daly City, Pacifica, and Colma. It was recently selected as a California Distinguished School.

== History ==
Westmoor High School was established in 1956 as the primary high school to serve the new Westlake neighborhood on the west side of Daly City.

In the school years of 2004, 2005, and 2006, Westmoor became eligible for California Distinguished School status, but was not awarded the designation until 2009. In recent years, its California Standardized Test scores have risen to an 8/10.

Throughout the years, numerous individuals, such as participants in the Civil Rights Movement and numerous California politicians, have visited Westmoor. In 2004, Democratic presidential candidate John Kerry made a campaign stop at Westmoor, speaking publicly in the main gymnasium.

== Campus ==
Quad

The original campus building, designed by architect Mario J. Ciampi, attracted national acclaim due to its modern design elements. The building was sometimes called the "Glass Palace" due to the extensive use of architectural glass in its design. Ciampi received an honor award from the American Institute of Architects in 1959 for his work on Westmoor. The campus is built on what was previously a pig farm and ranch.

Westmoor's main building was renovated and extended during the 2000–01 school year, and most of its original architectural and glass features were destroyed.

== Demographics ==
White	Latino	Asian	African American	Pacific Islander	American Indian	Two or more races
6%	21%	67%	1%	0.4%	0%	5%

According to U.S. News & World Report, 94% of Westmoor's student body is "of color", with 40% of the student body coming from economically disadvantaged households, determined by student eligibility for California's Reduced-price meal program.

== Academics ==
=== Curriculum ===
In addition to offering the standard English, science, social science and mathematics courses, Westmoor offers Advanced Placement courses: English Language, English Literature, U.S. History, Statistics, Calculus AB, Biology, Chemistry, Physics, Studio Art, Spanish, American Government, Economics, Psychology, and European History. Westmoor's curriculum includes a variety of art and music programs such as fabric arts, ceramics, drawing and painting, general art, graphic design, as well as band, chorus, and theater arts. The foreign language department offers Spanish and French. In addition, Westmoor offers several elective courses in business, computer, and industrial art fields. The AVID program serves to assist students, where they prepare for college and learn fundamental skills that will guide them to academic success.

=== Semester grading system ===
In the 2004–05 school year, Westmoor and other schools in the Jefferson Union High School District changed their grading periods from four quarters in two semesters per year to simply two semesters. Student progress reports are issued each third of a semester.

=== Sustained Silent Reading ===
Westmoor began the Sustained Silent Reading (SSR) program in 2001. On a normal schedule, a twenty-minute period is designated for SSR on Tuesdays, Wednesdays, and Thursdays. Starting in the 2005–06 school year, this period recurs on a rotating basis at the beginning of the 1st through 6th periods. During SSR, students and teachers are excluded from classwork, reading textbooks, or writing. Westmoor believes that giving students 17 minutes a day to read instead of giving them a homeroom period or study hall will improve their productivity as a student.

=== Standardized testing ===
SAT scores for 2013–2014
	Critical Reading average	Math average	Writing average
Westmoor High School	502	553	507
Jefferson Union District	503	536	500
San Mateo County	546	576	548
Statewide	492	506	489

== Extracurricular activities ==

=== Student journalism/yearbook ===
The Rampage is the official school-sponsored newspaper at Westmoor. It is written and published by the students of the Publications class, which also works on the school yearbook. It is generally regarded as a high-quality publication with engaging articles and interviews with Westmoor staff and students. Articles often include relevant topics, such as recent school events and world news, as well as pieces on pop culture and debate topics in which two writers with differing opinions on certain subject matters write side by side opinion pieces. It is published on the school website. The Rampage produced its first and only issue of the 2004–05 school year in October 2004, although it had several more issues planned that were never published before the end of the school year. In the 2013-2014 year, however, it published five issues, more than any years previous, due to a change in editing staff.

== Athletics ==
Westmoor is a member of the Central Coast Section (CCS) and competes in the Peninsula Athletic League (PAL). The school was a member of the North Coast Section from 1957 to 1965, when the Central Coast Section was created. They competed in the Peninsula League from 1957 to 1961, along with more established schools in San Mateo County such as Aragon, Burlingame, Capuchino, Hillsdale, Mills, Jefferson, San Mateo, and South San Francisco. From 1961 to 1995, Westmoor competed in the North Peninsula League (NPL), along with El Camino, Half Moon Bay, Jefferson, Oceana, Serramonte, South San Francisco, and Terra Nova. In 1996, the NPL and PAL merged, making the PAL a super-league. However, PAL is split into two divisions: Bay and Ocean.

The school once fielded boys football, girls softball, girls gymnastics, and boys golf.

=== Football ===
The football program at Westmoor was dropped in April 1996 by then Principal Gary Johnson due to financial hardships and low participation. At the end of the 1995 season, the team did not have a winning season in 10 years and had not beaten their rival, Jefferson High, in 13 years. The team made two CCS playoff appearances in 1972 and 1982, and won the league title in 1972.

The team played its last season in the 1995 and finished 2–7 overall, 1–5 in league play. Throughout the season, the team struggled, losing players due to injuries and grades, resulting in an average of 20 players suiting up each game.

Westmoor's football team had only four coaches in its history. Pete Matisi coached the team from its beginning from 1957 to 1981, when he retired. Ken Cook took over the program 1982–1988, coming over from the closure of Serramonte High School. Dan Ramirez coached the team in 1989 and Mike Williams coached the team in 1990 and 1991. Darryl Kennedy coached the last three years of the program from 1992 to 1995.

Westmoor's main football rival was Jefferson High School. Their game was dubbed by newspapers as the Daly City Bowl or the Greater Daly City–Colma Chamber of Commerce Trophy Game. Jefferson won the first meeting between the two teams in 1957, 32–12. Westmoor took the trophy from 1958 to 1967 and from 1969 to 1977. Jefferson won the annual game from 1978 to 1981, 1983 to 1986, and 1988 to 1995. There were two ties in the 39-year history: in 1968 and 1987. Westmoor still holds the overall lead in the rivalry with a record of 20–17–2.

== Notable alumni ==
- Greg Adams, known as an original member of the Tower of Power
- Brett Barron, member of the 1984 US Olympic judo team
- Bren Bataclan, Cambridge-based visual artist
- Leo Biedermann, former NFL player for the Cleveland Browns
- Efrain Burgos Jr., professional soccer player for Chalatenango
- Michael Guingona, 1980, four-term Mayor of Daly City
- DJ Apollo, turntablist who pioneered turntablism with the Invisibl Skratch Piklz
- H.P. Mendoza, known for Colma: The Musical
- Mix Master Mike, turntablist, DJ for the Beastie Boys
- Ed Montague, MLB umpire
- Dave Pelzer, author, known for A Child Called "It"
- Tom Torlakson, California State Senator

== See also ==
- San Mateo County high schools
- Tom Orloff
