= Grafton High School (Massachusetts) =

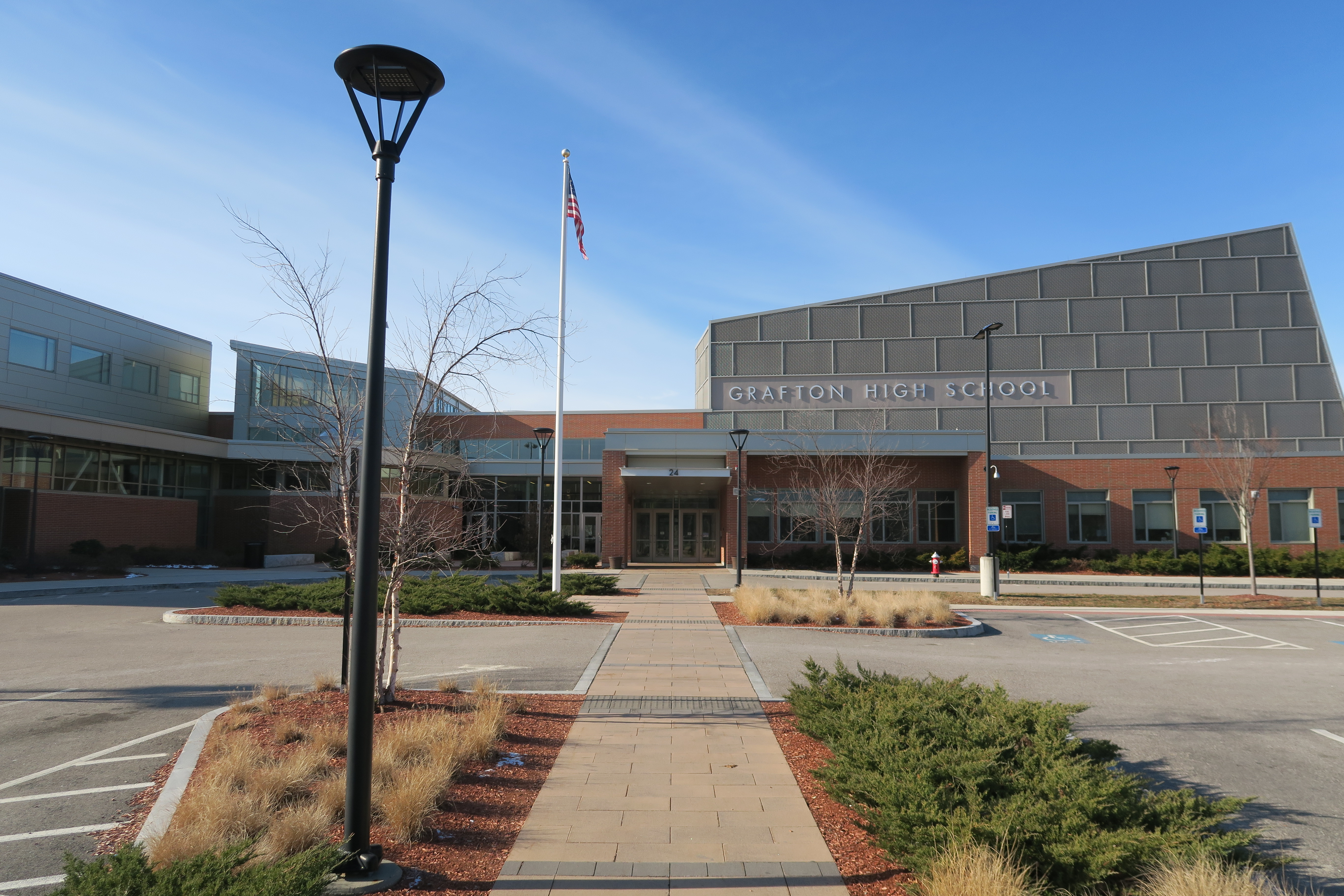

Location
- 24 Providence Rd; Grafton, Massachusetts 01519; United States; 42.21196°N 71.69564°W

Information
- Type: Public School; Open enrollment
- Motto: To prepare our students intellectually, physically, and socially for their role as life-long learners and responsible citizens."
- Established: 1838
- Superintendent: James Cummings
- Principal: Tracey Calo
- Staff: 70.72 (FTE)
- Grades: 9–12
- Enrollment: 891 (2023–2024)
- Student to teacher ratio: 12.60
- Colors: Green & White
- Athletics conference: Midland Wachusett League
- Mascot: Gators
- Newspaper: The Grafton Globe
- Website: ghs.graftonps.org

Grafton High School is a high school in Grafton, Massachusetts, United States. The school has an enrollment size of approximately 900 students in grades 9–12.

The curriculum offers a wide variety of courses in areas of business and computer science, music, video game design, English, family consumer science, health, physical education, mathematics, science and technology, social studies, special education, visual and performing arts, world languages, community service, school service, and independent studies.

== History ==
Although Grafton operated a high school as early as 1838, the first purpose-built building was constructed in 1850, and served as the town’s high school for over 100 years. In 1952, the “Grafton Junior-Senior High School” opened on a large parcel of land along Lake Ripple. The school moved to a new building on the same parcel in 1963 and, in 2012, to its current building. The 1963 high school now serves as the Grafton Middle School housing grades 7 and 8, and the 1952 building serves as the town’s municipal offices and senior center.

== Athletics ==
Grafton High School is home to the Grafton Gators. The school hosts many sports teams including soccer, football, track and field, lacrosse, basketball, ice hockey, baseball, cheerleading, field hockey, tennis, golf, cross country and softball. The school is part of the Southern Worcester County Athletic League. The ice hockey and softball teams recently won the State Championship in 2017.

== Notable alumni ==
- Ricky Duran, contestant on season 17 of The Voice on NBC
- Obi Melifonwu, NFL safety
- Ifeatu Melifonwu, American football safety for the Tampa Bay Buccaneers
- Bob Parlin, teacher and LGBTQ+ activist
- Steve Spagnuolo, defensive coordinator for the Kansas City Chiefs of the National Football League
- Robert Scott Wilson, actor recognized for his work on All My Children and Days of Our Lives
