= Pearl A. Harwood =

American writer

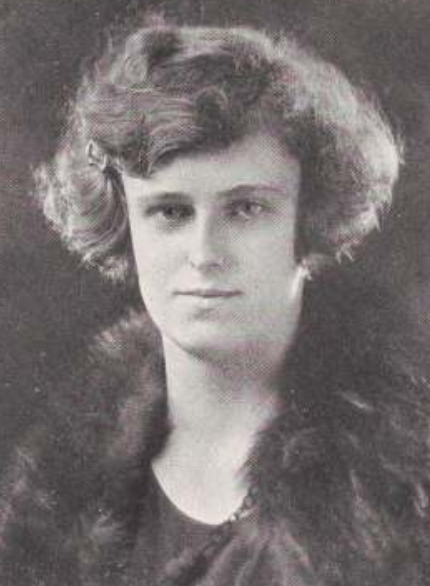
- Pearl A. Bragdon, from the 1924 yearbook of Mount Holyoke College
- Born: Pearl Augusta Bragdon; December 21, 1903; Grafton, Massachusetts
- Died: October 28, 1998; Florida
- Occupation(s): Writer, educator, librarian

Pearl A. Harwood (December 21, 1903 – October 28, 1998), born Pearl Augusta Bragdon, was an American librarian and writer of children's books.

== Early life and education ==
Pearl Augusta Bragdon was born in Grafton, Massachusetts and raised in New Rochelle, New York, the daughter of Clifford Sawyer Bragdon and Helen Louise Woodside Bragdon. Her father was a school principal. Her mother died in 1909, and her father remarried in 1911. She earned a bachelor's degree from Mount Holyoke College in 1924, and a master's degree in education from Boston University.

Her older sister Helen Dalton Bragdon was also a writer and educator.

== Career ==
As a young woman, Bragdon was a research assistant at Perkins School for the Blind in Massachusetts. After marriage Harwood taught and worked as a children's librarian in Southern California. She served on the board of the Friends of the Escondido Public Library in the 1970s. She was active in the Women's Club of Escondido and the Braille Club of Escondido.

Harwood wrote over thirty children's books, beginning in 1964 with the first "Mr. Bumba" books. She wrote ten "Mr. Bumba" books, ten "Mrs. Moon" books, and ten books about the two characters together, all picture books first published between 1964 and 1971, and illustrated by George Overlie or Joseph Folger. She wrote other books, including The Widdles (1966), a book about children in Hawaii, illustrated by Henning Black Jensen, and Secrets of the Trees in the Village by the Sea (1971).

== Selected books by Pearl A. Harwood ==
- Mr. Bumba's New Job (1964)
- Mr. Bumba's New Home (1964)
- Mr. Bumba and the Orange Grove (1965)
- The Widdles (1966)
- Mr. Bumba Draws a Kitten (1966)
- Mrs. Moon's Rescue (1967)
- Mrs. Moon and the Dark Stairs (1967)
- Mrs. Moon Goes Shopping (1967)
- Mrs. Moon and her Friends (1967)
- Mrs. Moon's Polliwogs (1967)
- A Special Guest for Mr. and Mrs Bumba (1971)
- New Year's Day with Mr. and Mrs. Bumba (1971)
- Climbing a Mountain with Mr. and Mrs. Bumba (1971)
- A Long Vacation for Mr. and Mrs. Bumba (1971)
- The Carnival with Mr. and Mrs. Bumba (1971)
- Secrets of the Trees in the Village by the Sea (1971)

== Personal life ==
Pearl Bragdon married Lester Everett Harwood in 1933. Her husband was from Vermont and sold insurance, before her retired and founded the Pet Assistance Foundation in Escondido. They had twin sons. She was president of the Mothers of Twins Club in Crescenta-Cañada-Glendale in the early 1960s. She died in 1998, aged 94 years, in Florida. Her papers are in the de Grummond Children's Literature Collection at the University of Southern Mississippi.
