= Fisherville Historic District =

Historic district in Massachusetts, United States

- U.S. National Register of Historic Places
- U.S. Historic district
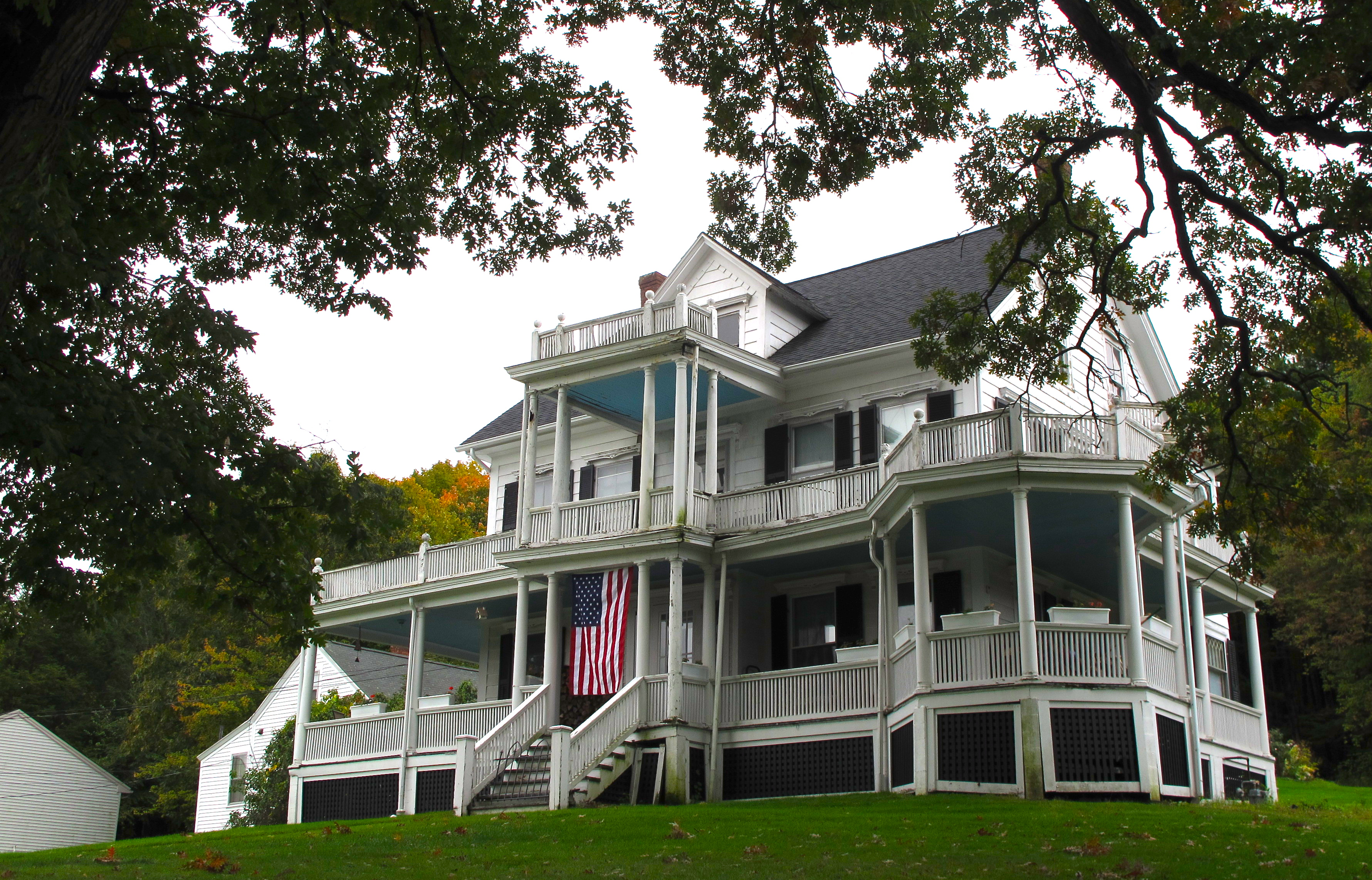
- A Ferry Street home

- Location within Massachusetts Location within the United States
- Location: Grafton, Massachusetts
- Coordinates: 42°10′37″N 71°41′40″W
- Architectural style: Late 19th And 20th Century Revivals
- NRHP reference No.: 96000056
- Added to NRHP: February 16, 1996

The Fisherville Historic District is a historic district encompassing one of the four 19th-century industrial villages of Grafton, Massachusetts. The area's first industrial activity was in 1831–2, when Peter Farnum (who had a mill at Farnumsville) and business partners built a brick mill there. A densely packed residential area grew around the mill complex, which achieved its present configuration c. 1909. The largest period of growth in terms of residential housing was in the last two decades of the 19th century, when a significant number of Italianate and Queen Anne worker houses were built.

Although villages in Massachusetts are not incorporated places, the U.S. Postal Service operated a post office here from 1882 to 1960. The area is now served by the South Grafton post office and has the ZIP Code of 01560.

The district was listed on the National Register of Historic Places in 1996.

== See also ==
- National Register of Historic Places listings in Worcester County, Massachusetts
- Farnumsville Historic District
