= Obi Melifonwu =

American football player (born 1994)

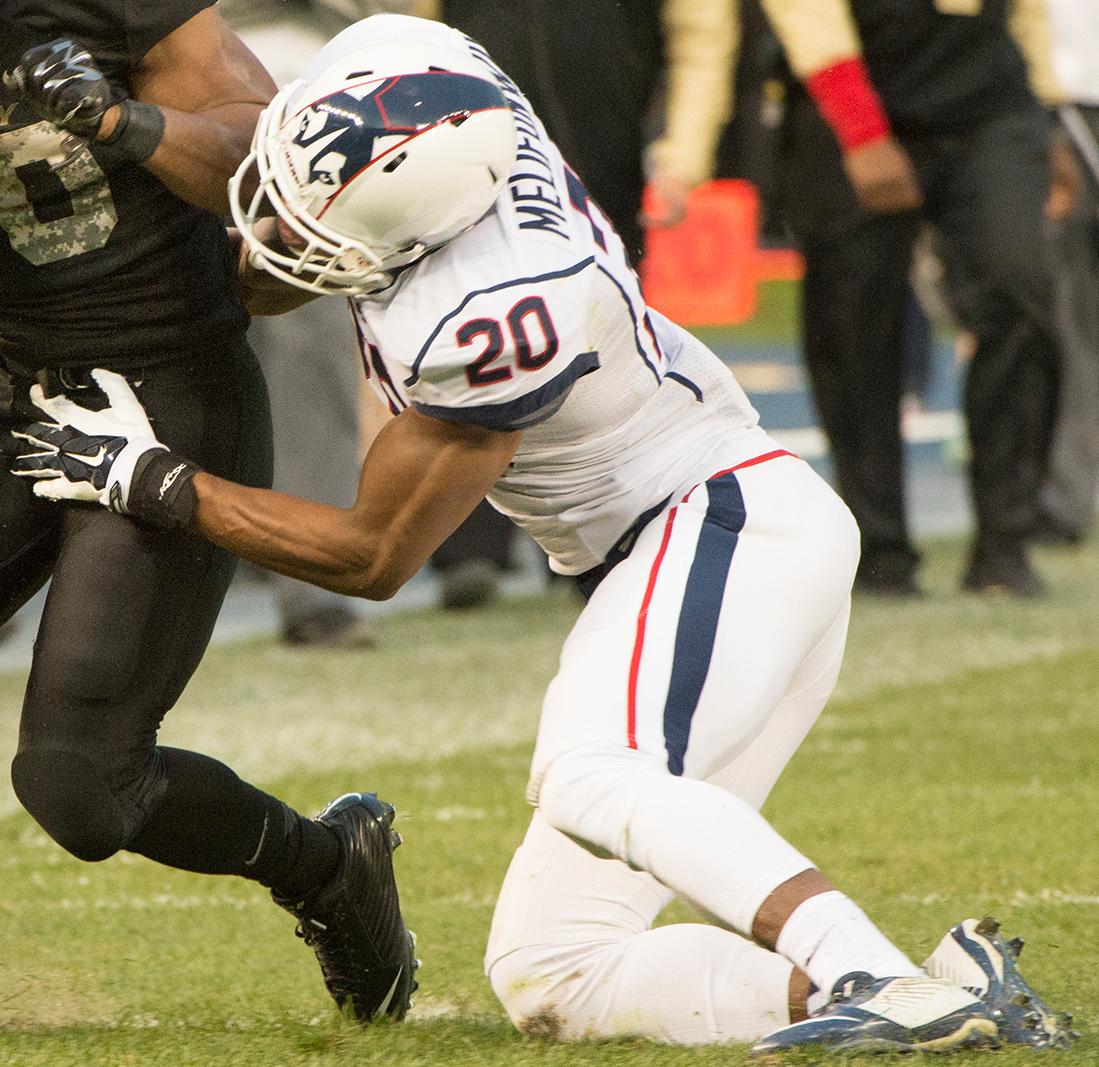
- Melifonwu with the UConn Huskies in 2014

San Antonio Toros
- Position: Safety

Personal information
- Born: April 5, 1994 (age 32); London, England
- Listed height: 6 ft 4 in (1.93 m)
- Listed weight: 224 lb (102 kg)

Career information
- High school: Grafton (Grafton, Massachusetts, U.S.)
- College: UConn (2012–2016)
- NFL draft: 2017: 2nd round, 56th overall pick

Career history
- Oakland Raiders (2017–2018); New England Patriots (2018–2019); San Francisco 49ers (2021)*; Philadelphia Eagles (2021); Tampa Bay Bandits (2022); St. Louis Battlehawks (2023)*; Memphis Showboats (2025); San Antonio Toros (2026–present)
- * Offseason or practice squad member only

Awards and highlights
- Super Bowl champion (LIII); First-team All-AAC (2016)

Career NFL statistics
- Total tackles: 10
- Stats at Pro Football Reference

Henry-William Obiajulu Melifonwu // (born April 5, 1994) is an American football safety for the San Antonio Toros of the Continental Football League. He played college football at UConn. He was selected in the second round of the 2017 NFL draft by the Oakland Raiders.

== Early life ==
Henry William Obiajulu Melifonwu was born in London on April 5, 1994. His parents are Igbo Nigerians who moved to England. At age 3, Melifonwu's family moved to the USA. His middle name, Obiajulu, means 'consoled heart'. He has one older brother Michael, a sister Jennifer, and two younger brothers, Nonso and Ifeatu.

Melifonwu attended Grafton High School in Grafton, Massachusetts. He played defensive back, quarterback and running back. As a senior, he rushed for 1,394 yards with 17 touchdowns. Melifonwu committed to the University of Connecticut to play college football.

== College career ==
Melifonwu redshirted his first year at Connecticut in 2012. As a redshirt freshman in 2013, he started all 12 games and had 70 tackles and two interceptions. As a redshirt sophomore in 2014, he started 11 games, recording 75 tackles. As a redshirt junior in 2015, he started 12 of 13 games and had 88 tackles and two interceptions. As a senior in 2016, he started all 13 games and recorded 118 tackles and four interceptions.

== Professional career ==
=== Pre-draft ===
Melifonwu received an invitation to the Senior Bowl and made three combined tackles as a part of the North who lost 16–15 to the South. He was able to raise his draft stock after performing well during the Senior Bowl practices. Melifonwu attended the NFL Combine and completed the majority of combine and positional drills, but decided to skip the three-cone drill and short shuttle. He had impressive performances in the vertical jump, broad jump, and 40-yard dash that further raised his draft stock. He also participated at Connecticut's Pro Day and completed the short shuttle, three-cone drill, and positional drills in front of 25 NFL scouts from 20 NFL teams. His numbers in the short shuttle and three-cone drill would've ranked second among all positions if he would've posted those times at the NFL Combine. He had private workouts and visits with 11 NFL teams, including the San Francisco 49ers, Cleveland Browns, Dallas Cowboys, Miami Dolphins, Philadelphia Eagles, Detroit Lions, Carolina Panthers, Washington Redskins, New Orleans Saints, Seattle Seahawks, and Pittsburgh Steelers. NFL draft experts and analysts projected him to be a second round pick. He was ranked the fourth best strong safety in the draft by NFLDraftScout.com, the fourth best safety by NFL analysts Mike Mayock and Bucky Brooks, was ranked the fifth best safety by ESPN, and was ranked the sixth best safety by Sports Illustrated.

Pre-draft measurables
Height	Weight	Arm length	Hand span	Wingspan	40-yard dash	10-yard split	20-yard split	20-yard shuttle	Three-cone drill	Vertical jump	Broad jump	Bench press
6 ft 3 7/8 in (1.93 m)	224 lb (102 kg)	32 1/2 in (0.83 m)	9 1/8 in (0.23 m)	6 ft 7 1/4 in (2.01 m)	4.40 s	1.51 s	2.55 s	4.30 s	7.07 s	44.0 in (1.12 m)	11 ft 9 in (3.58 m)	17 reps
All values from NFL Combine/UConn's Pro Day

=== Oakland Raiders ===
The Oakland Raiders selected Melifonwu in the second round (56th overall) of the 2017 NFL draft. He was placed on injured reserve on September 5, 2017, with eligibility to return in 2017. Melifonwu was activated from injured reserve to the active roster on November 4. He was placed back on injured reserve on December 15, after having hip surgery.

On August 23, 2018, Melifonwu was waived/injured by the Raiders. He was placed on injured reserve the next day after clearing waivers. Melifonwu was released by Oakland on October 23.

=== New England Patriots ===
On November 5, 2018, Melifonwu signed a two-year contract with the New England Patriots. Melifonwu appeared in two games for the Patriots, recording three tackles. Melifonwu and the Patriots eventually reached Super Bowl LIII where they beat the Los Angeles Rams 13–3.

On September 9, 2019, Melifonwu was waived by the Patriots and re-signed to the practice squad. He signed a reserve/future contract with the Patriots on January 6, 2020. On April 27, Melifonwu was released by the Patriots.

=== San Francisco 49ers ===
On January 4, 2021, Melifonwu signed a reserve/future contract with the San Francisco 49ers. He was waived by San Francisco on April 29.

=== Philadelphia Eagles ===
On July 29, 2021, the Philadelphia Eagles signed Melifonwu. He was waived/injured on August 9, and placed on injured reserve. Melifonwu was released by the Eagles on September 14.

=== Tampa Bay Bandits ===
Melifonwu was drafted by the Tampa Bay Bandits of the United States Football League (USFL) in the 18th round of the 2022 USFL draft. He was transferred to the team's inactive roster on May 6, 2022, with a thigh injury. Melifonwu was moved back to the active roster on May 11.

=== St. Louis BattleHawks ===
On February 4, 2023, Melifonwu was signed by the St. Louis BattleHawks of the XFL. He was released by the BattleHawks on February 9.

=== Memphis Showboats ===
On January 30, 2025, Melifonwu signed with the Memphis Showboats of the United Football League (UFL).

=== San Antonio Toros ===
On May 12, 2026, Melifonwu signed with the San Antonio Toros of the Continental Football League. He was named to the 2026 All-CoFL team.

== Personal life ==
His younger brother, Ifeatu Melifonwu, played college football at Syracuse and was selected by the Detroit Lions in the 3rd round of the 2021 NFL draft.
