= Grafton State Hospital =

- Massachusetts Department of Mental Health
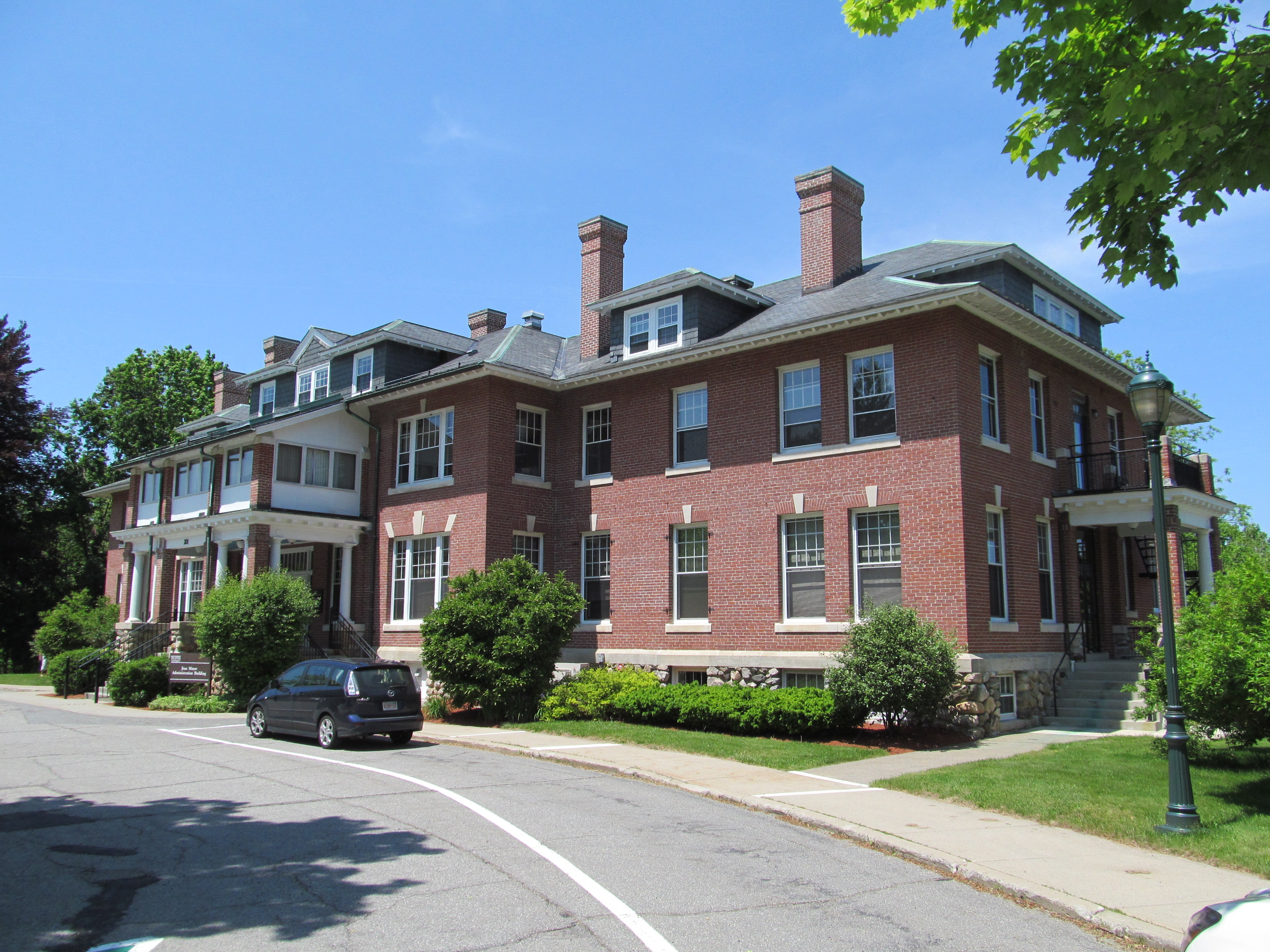
- Former Administration Building

Geography
- Location: Grafton, Massachusetts, United States

Organization
- Type: Mental hospital

History
- Founded: 1901
- Closed: 1973

Links
- Lists: Hospitals in Massachusetts
- Other links
- Grafton State Hospital
- U.S. National Register of Historic Places
- Location within Massachusetts
- Location: Westborough Rd. & Green St., Grafton, Massachusetts
- Coordinates: 42°14′51.7″N 71°40′41.8″W
- Built: 1900-1949
- Architect: Fuller & Delano, Desmond & Lord
- Architectural style: Colonial Revival, Bungalow/Craftsman
- MPS: Worcester MRA
- NRHP reference No.: 94000691
- Added to NRHP: 1994

Grafton State Hospital was a psychiatric hospital in Grafton, Massachusetts that operated from 1901 to 1973. Today, the site has been redeveloped with Tufts University's Cummings School of Veterinary Medicine as a major occupant, along with the Grafton Job Corps office and various other State agencies.

Because of its significance in the history of the treatment of the mentally ill and its layout and institutional architecture, the hospital area was accepted to the National Register of Historic Places in 1994.

== History ==
Grafton State Hospital was established in 1901 as a farm colony for "chronic insane patients" of the Worcester State Hospital. In 1912 it was administratively separated from Worcester.

The Grafton campus was built to both increase the capacity of the Worcester hospital and to provide therapeutic work for patients. To start the new hospital, the Commonwealth of Massachusetts purchased approximately 700 acres (280 ha) of land in northeast Grafton and abutting portions of Shrewsbury, from the Ashley and Sinclair families, Samuel Knowlton and Lyman Rice. Intended to be self-sufficient, agriculture was an important part of the hospital's plan. As the agricultural focus grew other areas of treatment suffered, leading the state to conclude in 1945 that "there is little or no occupational therapy in effect now. Farming, canning, and general maintenance are the institution's principal occupations."

In 1957, noted jazz musician Thelonious Monk was briefly held for observation at the Grafton State Hospital after a State Trooper found him at Logan Airport acting erratically and then becoming unresponsive to questioning.

The hospital closed in 1973 when Dr. Sevinsky was charged with raping several of the patients as the first in a series of closures of state institutions in Massachusetts, in a process known as deinstitutionalization.

=== Patient census ===
CENSUS OF GRAFTON STATE HOSPITAL

- Year 1908: over 500 patients
- Year 1912: 650 patients
- Year 1916: over 800 patients
- Year 1930: 1550 patients, 328 staff
- Year 1931: 1154 patients (563 women, 591 men)
- Year 1945: 1730 patients, 250 staff with 241 vacancies
- Year 1956: 4537 patients, 200 staff
- Year 1973: 641 patients

== Campus ==
The colony is located at the juncture of the Grafton, Shrewsbury, and Westborough town lines, centered at the junction of Pine Street and Westborough Road (Massachusetts Route 30) in North Grafton. The original site of 700 acres (280 ha) was expanded to over 800 acres (320 ha) by 1908 with the purchase of portions of Green Hill to expand the water supply. By 1945 it encompassed 1,200 acres (490 ha). The Hospital occupied a hilly scenic site surrounded by woodlands, wetlands, and agricultural fields which are still used for hay, corn, and animal pasture by the Cummings School of Veterinary Medicine. Much of the hospital's land was previously farmland which had been allowed to go fallow by private owners in the late-nineteenth century, and was only gradually reclaimed for productive use by the hospital.

Tnts and was developed with large-scale brick wards that provided locked confinement for large numbers of inmates. Similarly, Elms was developed with masonry buildings for "excited" male patients. A few wood-frame dormitories provided a transition for more stable patients. As the center of agricultural activities, Oaks was developed with unlocked cottages for male patients who had proved themselves trustworthy and industrious. The Willows was developed somewhat later during the campus expansion was similar to Oaks. The classes of patients were defined in terms of behavior rather than diagnosis, e.g. "excited", "violent", "quiet", "peaceful", etc.

=== Current use ===
A former Boston & Worcester Railroad line, now owned by CSX Transportation and used by the MBTA Commuter Rail Framingham/Worcester Line, bisects the campus. The Grafton Commuter Rail stop is located on the former site, off of Pine Street. In 1978, shortly after the closing of the hospital, Tufts University entered into an agreement with the state to develop a veterinary college on the site, now known as the Cummings School of Veterinary Medicine. Simultaneously, the Job Corps program opened a campus on the hospital site.

121 acres (49 ha) of the original site has become Centech Park, part of a state designated Economic Target Area and now home to several companies.

In 2008 Tufts began construction of the New England Regional Biosafety Laboratory on 100 acres (0.40 km^{2}) of former Hospital land. The development will be the anchor of the Grafton Science Park, designed to spur economic development in Grafton. The laboratory will be capable of Biosafety level 2 and 3 research on infectious agents.
