= Bob Parlin =

American educator and LGBTQ+ activist

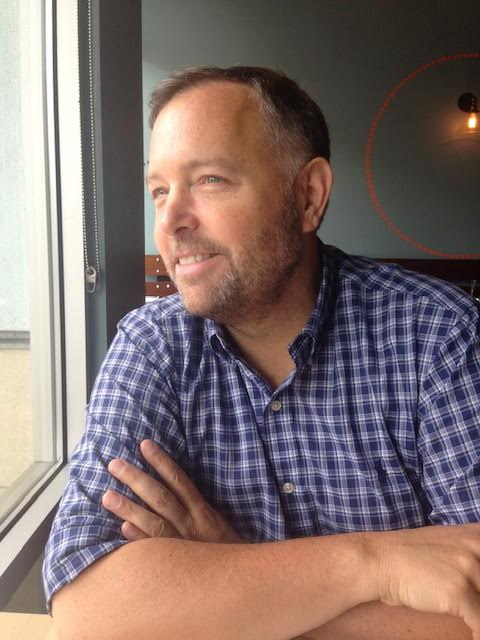
- Born: Robert L. Parlin; 1963 (age 62–63); Grafton, MA
- Education: Harvard University
- Occupations: Educator; LGBTQ+ activist
- Spouse: Bren Bataclan (m. 1998)

Bob Parlin is an American educator and LGBTQ+ activist. A high school teacher from 1987 to 2022, he created the first Gay-Straight Alliance at a public school.

== Early life and education ==
Parlin was born in Grafton, Massachusetts to Arthur W. Parlin and Deborah (Arnold) Parlin. He attended Grafton High School, where he served as a member of the student council, class president and valedictorian. He was also the editor of the school newspaper and played on its football team. He realized he was gay in middle school. Deeply closeted, he later said that in high school he was intensely lonely and isolated and constantly monitored his speech and behavior to keep from exposing his sexual orientation. He graduated from Harvard College in 1985 and received a master's degree from the Harvard Graduate School of Education in 1987, later serving on its Alumni Council. He came out during his sophomore year.

== Career ==
Parlin began teaching at Newton South High School in Newton, Massachusetts in 1987. He came out to the faculty during a meeting of the Committee on Human Differences at the school in response to a colleague's statements that "homosexuality wasn't an issue at Newton South" and in "20 years of teaching he had never encountered a single gay student." Parlin wrote about his experience at Newton South in the 2010 book, One Teacher in Ten, edited by Kevin Jennings.

Parlin told his students he was gay shortly after the 1991 meeting. He said: “It would have helped enormously if I’d had even one openly gay teacher in high school to serve as a role model.” He subsequently started the Gay-Straight Alliance at Newton South. The first GSA at a public school, it was based on the same initiative at Concord Academy, a private school. Parlin also co-founded the Gay and Lesbian Student Education Network (GLSEN) to reduce school-based harassment, incorporate gay and lesbian content into school curriculum and offer role models for gay, lesbian, and straight students.

In December 1993, a twice-defeated Massachusetts bill that outlawed discrimination against gay and lesbian students in public school was passed. Due in part to a campaign by members of the Gay-Straight Alliance and other openly gay students, an article in the New York Times reported "the difference this year was an extraordinary lobbying campaign by the students themselves. Hundreds of them -- gay and lesbian, as well as heterosexual -- wrote letters to their legislators, staged rallies and candlelight vigils at the State House and met personally with all 40 Senators, or their aides." Massachusetts became the first state to enact legislation to protect gay students from discrimination based on sexual orientation. Parlin subsequently helped to create the Massachusetts Safe Schools Program for Gay and Lesbian Students and over the course of his career conducted more than 350 trainings on LGBTQ+ issues for teachers, administrators, parents, students and community members throughout New England.

Parlin came out to his students every year, and spoke on subjects such as homophobia during the school's annual Transgender, Bisexual, Gay and Lesbian Awareness Day. In addition to his involvement with other organizations related to LGBTQ+ rights, he was a founding member of the Cambridge GLBT Commission and prominently advocated for legislation that allowed gay or unmarried heterosexual couples to register as domestic partners and thus be eligible for bereavement, health insurance and pension benefits. He co-founded the Newton South Human Rights Council in 2020 and was an advisor to the Newton South Gay-Straight Alliance for more than 30 years, from its founding until his retirement in 2022.

== Personal life ==
Parlin and his husband, Bren Bataclan, an artist, were the first gay couple to hold a commitment ceremony at Harvard's Memorial Church. They were married at the Old Cambridge Baptist Church in 2004; lining up on the steps of Cambridge City Hall, they filed for a marriage license on the day same sex-marriage in Massachusetts was legally recognized. They live in Cambridge.
