= Farnumsville Historic District =

Historic district in Massachusetts, United States

- U.S. National Register of Historic Places
- U.S. Historic district
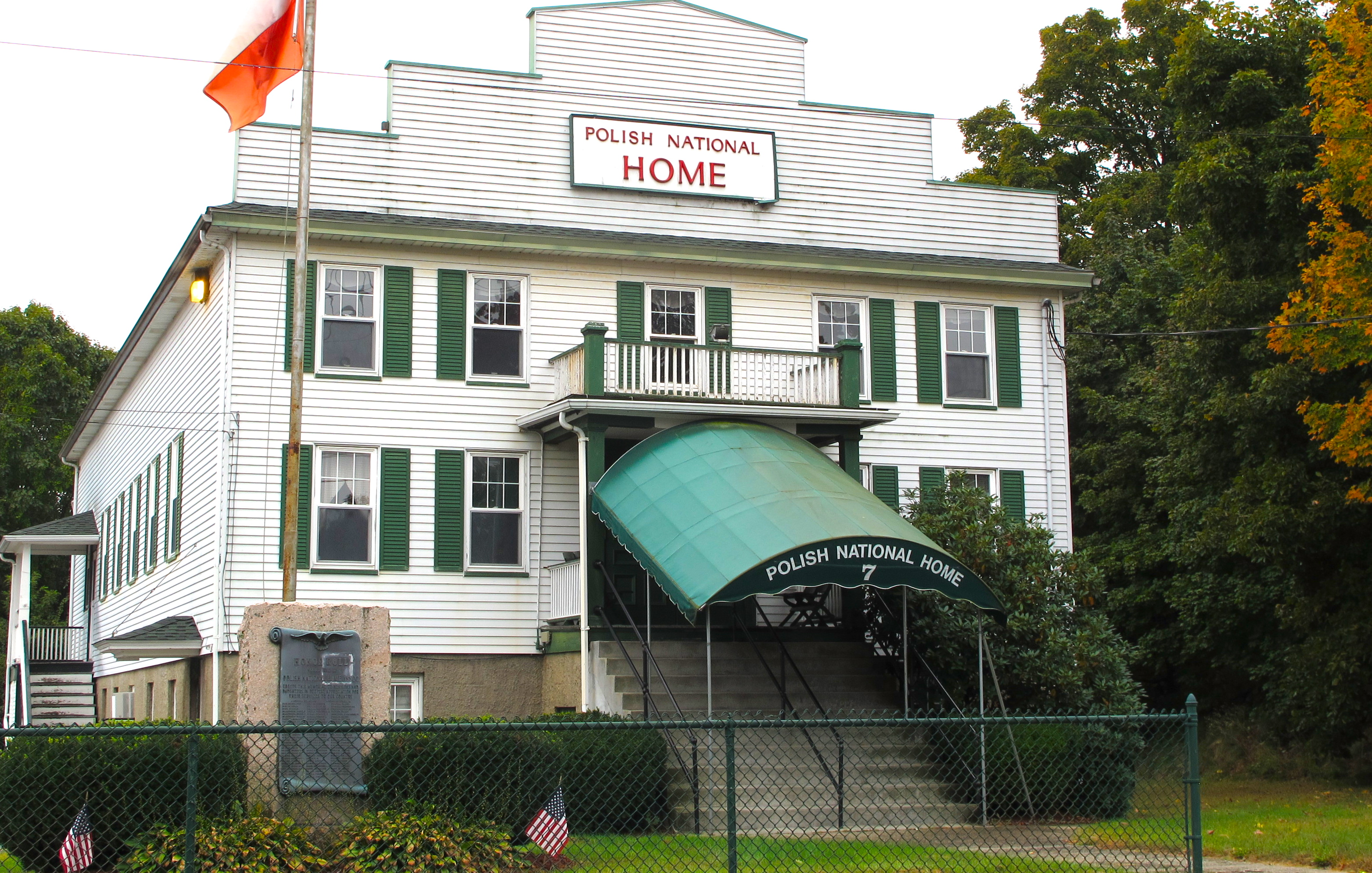
- The former Polish National Home

- Location within Massachusetts Location within the United States
- Location: Grafton, Massachusetts
- Coordinates: 42°10′28″N 71°41′3″W
- Architectural style: Late 19th And 20th Century Revivals
- NRHP reference No.: 96000052
- Added to NRHP: February 16, 1996

Farnumsville Historic District is a historic district encompassing a historic mill village in Grafton, Massachusetts. It is located on the eastern bank of the Blackstone River, extending along Providence and Main Streets, roughly between Cross and Depot Streets, and radiating along those roads and adjacent streets. This area was one of Grafton's 19th century industrial mill villages, which was centered on the Farnum Mill, which first began operating in the second decade of the 19th century. The main mill building that survives dates to 1844, and the housing stock in the village is in a diversity of styles, built roughly between the 1820s and 1920s.

Although villages in Massachusetts are not incorporated places, the U.S. Postal Service operated a post office here from 1831 to 1960. The area is now served by the South Grafton post office and has the ZIP Code of 01560.

The district was added to the National Register of Historic Places in 1996.

== See also ==
- National Register of Historic Places listings in Worcester County, Massachusetts
- Fisherville Historic District
