= Steve Spagnuolo =

American football coach (born 1959)

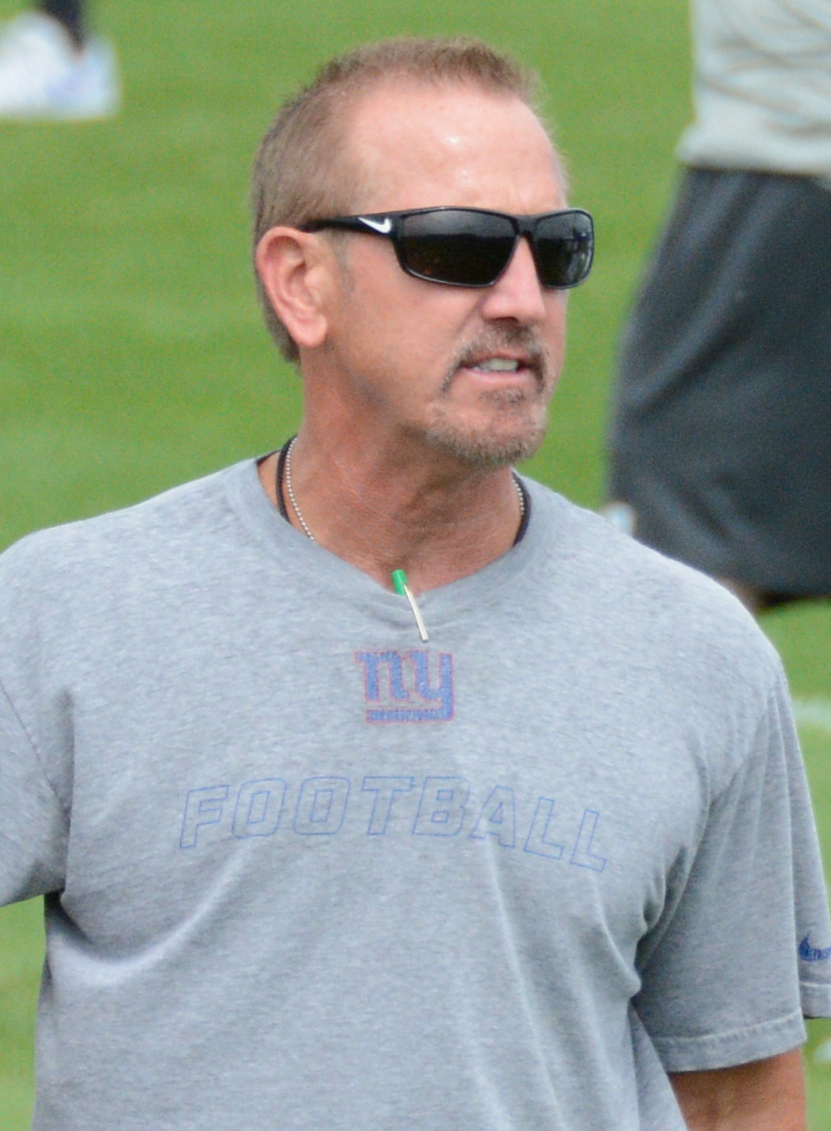
- Spagnuolo with the New York Giants in 2017

Kansas City Chiefs
- Title: Defensive coordinator

Personal information
- Born: December 21, 1959 (age 66); Whitinsville, Massachusetts, U.S.

Career information
- Position: Wide receiver
- High school: Grafton (MA)
- College: Springfield (1978–1980)

Career history
- Massachusetts (1981–1982) Graduate assistant; Washington Redskins (1983) Player personnel intern; Lafayette (1984–1986) Defensive line coach & special teams coach; Connecticut (1987–1991); Defensive backs coach (1987–1991); Defensive coordinator (1989–1991); Barcelona Dragons (1992) Defensive line coach & special teams coach; Maine (1993–1994); Defensive backs coach (1993); Defensive coordinator & linebackers coach (1994); Rutgers (1994–1995) Defensive backs coach; Bowling Green (1996–1997) Defensive backs coach; Frankfurt Galaxy (1998) Defensive coordinator & linebackers coach; Philadelphia Eagles (1999–2006); Defensive assistant (1999–2000); Defensive backs coach (2001–2003); Linebackers coach (2004–2006); New York Giants (2007–2008) Defensive coordinator; St. Louis Rams (2009–2011) Head coach; New Orleans Saints (2012) Defensive coordinator; Baltimore Ravens (2013–2014); Senior defensive assistant (2013); Secondary coach (2014); New York Giants (2015–2017); Defensive coordinator (2015–2017); Interim head coach (2017); Kansas City Chiefs (2019–present) Defensive coordinator

Awards and highlights
- 4× Super Bowl champion (XLII, LIV, LVII, LVIII)

Head coaching record
- Regular season: 11–41 (.212)
- Coaching profile at Pro Football Reference

Stephen Christopher Spagnuolo (/spæɡˈnoʊloʊ/ spag-NOH-loh; born December 21, 1959) is an American professional football coach who is the defensive coordinator for the Kansas City Chiefs of the National Football League (NFL). Nicknamed "Spags", Spagnuolo started his NFL coaching career with Andy Reid and the Philadelphia Eagles from 1999 to 2006, and as a defensive coordinator he has coached four top-10 defenses in terms of yardage. He has participated in seven Super Bowls, six as a defense coordinator and in Super Bowl XXXIX as a linebackers coach, winning one with the New York Giants and three with the Kansas City Chiefs. He is the only coordinator (offense or defense) in NFL history to win a Super Bowl with two different franchises and the only one to win four Super Bowls in that role. Some historic defenses that Spagnuolo has coached throughout his career include the 2007 New York Giants defense that defeated the undefeated New England Patriots in Super Bowl XLII and the current Kansas City Chiefs defense.

Following two seasons in New York, he became the head coach of the St. Louis Rams for three seasons, was an assistant with the Baltimore Ravens, had a one-season stint with the New Orleans Saints, and then returned to the Giants as defensive coordinator in 2015. He was named interim head coach after the firing of former head coach Ben McAdoo on December 4, 2017, before rejoining Reid with the Kansas City Chiefs in 2019.

Spagnuolo has also worked as a college football assistant coach for the University of Connecticut, the University of Maine, Lafayette College, Rutgers University, Bowling Green University, and the University of Massachusetts Amherst. He also spent time in the original World League of American Football and its successor, NFL Europe.

== Early life ==
Born in the Whitinsville section of Northbridge, Massachusetts, Spagnuolo moved to Grafton as a youth. After graduating from Grafton High School, Spagnuolo played wide receiver at Springfield College, earning the institution's Male Scholar-Athlete of the Year award in 1982. He assisted the University of Massachusetts football team while pursuing his graduate degree.

== Coaching career ==
=== Philadelphia Eagles ===
Spagnuolo began his NFL coaching career in the Philadelphia Eagles organization in 1999, serving as linebackers and defensive backs coach under head coach Andy Reid. Spagnuolo remained there for eight years, appearing in Super Bowl XXXIX where they lost to the New England Patriots 24–21 who were led by quarterback Tom Brady.

=== New York Giants ===
In January 2007, he was hired as the defensive coordinator for the New York Giants under head coach Tom Coughlin.

He spent two years in New York, and was the architect of the aggressive defensive strategy against the New England Patriots (the highest scoring offensive team in NFL history at the time) in Super Bowl XLII, which was instrumental in the close victory by the Giants. Spagnuolo's defense sacked the Patriots' Tom Brady five times, which was the most he had been sacked in any game that season. Following the Super Bowl win and a great deal of praise, Spagnuolo's name was widely circulated for open head coach positions around the NFL.

On February 7, 2008, he took his name out of consideration for the head coaching position of the Washington Redskins. The same day, the Giants made Spagnuolo one of the highest-paid defensive coordinators in the NFL with a new three-year contract, worth roughly $2 million a year.

=== St. Louis Rams ===
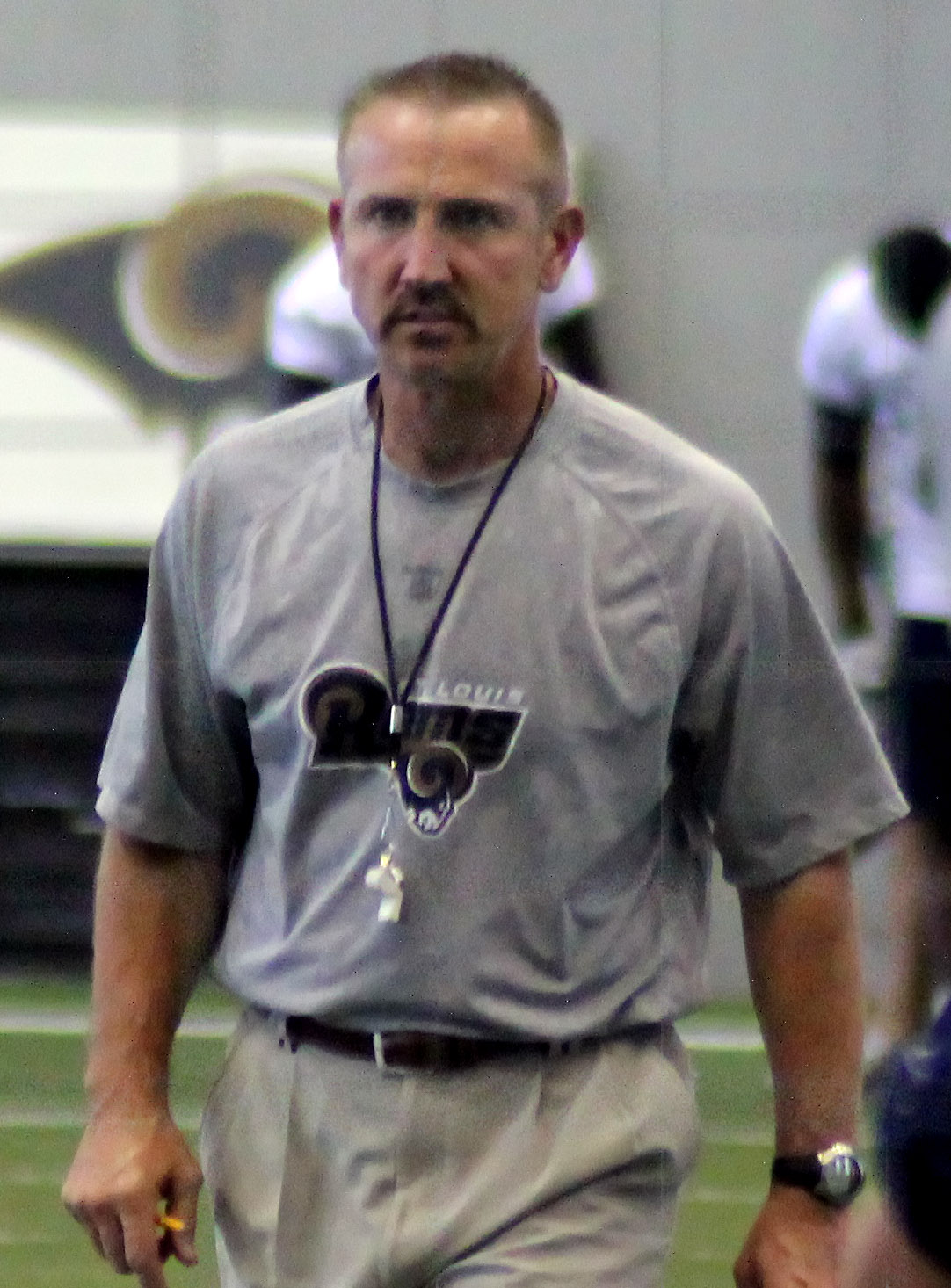
Spagnuolo in 2011

Following another successful season in 2008 in which the Giants finished the season 12–4, but lost in the Divisional round of the NFL Playoffs, Spagnuolo's name came up as a replacement for numerous head-coaching vacancies. These vacancies included the Denver Broncos, New York Jets, and Detroit Lions,, but Spagnuolo decided to join the St. Louis Rams, taking over their head-coaching vacancy with a 4-year, $11.5 million contract. Spagnuolo hired Pat Shurmur and Ken Flajole to be the Rams' offensive and defensive coordinators respectively. Spagnuolo then hired Josh McDaniels to be the team's offensive coordinator to replace Shurmur, who left for the Browns' head-coaching job.

Spagnuolo's first season saw the Rams go 1–15, the worst record in the league and the worst season in franchise history. After rebounding to 7–9 in 2010, they regressed to 2–14 in 2011, tied with the Indianapolis Colts with the worst record in the league. Spagnuolo was fired on January 2, 2012, after compiling a 10–38 overall record in his three seasons in St. Louis, the second-lowest winning percentage for a non-interim coach in franchise history.

=== New Orleans Saints ===
On January 19, 2012, Spagnuolo agreed to terms with the New Orleans Saints to become the new defensive coordinator under head coach Sean Payton, choosing this position rather than an offer from the Philadelphia Eagles. However, Payton was subsequently suspended for the season for his alleged role in the New Orleans Saints bounty scandal, leaving Spagnuolo to coach the defense without Payton's input. In 2012, the Saints allowed the most yards for a season of any defense in NFL history en route to finishing 7–9 and missing the playoffs for the first time in four years. Soon after Payton's suspension ended, Spagnuolo was fired on January 24, 2013.

=== Baltimore Ravens ===
Baltimore hired Spagnuolo as a senior defensive assistant before the 2013 season, then promoted him to assistant head coach/secondary coach in 2014.

=== New York Giants (second stint) ===
On January 15, 2015, Spagnuolo rejoined the New York Giants as defensive coordinator, serving under head coach Tom Coughlin in 2015 and then under head coach Ben McAdoo in 2016. The Giants finished 32nd in the NFL in yards allowed his first year back. They also allowed the most passing yards in NFL history (4,783) and the 3rd most points in the NFL that season (442). However, the defense rebounded to have the league's 10th best defense in 2016, which fueled the team to an 11–5 record. Spagnuolo became interim head coach of the Giants after a house cleaning by the organization after the firings of McAdoo and general manager Jerry Reese on December 4, 2017. He led them to a last-game win against the Washington Redskins, but finished 1–3 as interim head coach. After the season, Spagnuolo was not retained by new head coach Pat Shurmur, as Shurmur elected to hire James Bettcher as his defensive coordinator.

=== Kansas City Chiefs ===
On January 24, 2019, Spagnuolo was named defensive coordinator for the Kansas City Chiefs, replacing Bob Sutton who had been dismissed after the defense performed poorly in the 2018–19 season which included the loss to the Patriots in the AFC Championship Game. He was reunited with Andy Reid who had already been Chiefs head coach since 2013; Spagnuolo previously coached defensive backs and linebackers in Philadelphia from 1999 to 2006 during Reid's tenure there as head coach. In the 2019 season, Spagnuolo, having ditched the buzz cut in favor of a more traditional men’s coif, appeared in his third Super Bowl, and won his second title as the Chiefs beat the San Francisco 49ers 31–20 in Super Bowl LIV.

In the 2020 season, Spagnuolo reached his fourth Super Bowl, losing 31–9 to the Tampa Bay Buccaneers who were quarterbacked by Tom Brady. The Chiefs had committed a record eight penalties for 95 yards in the first half, most of which were called against the defense.

In the 2022 season, Spagnuolo appeared in his fifth Super Bowl and won his third title as the Chiefs beat the Philadelphia Eagles 38–35. The following year, he participated in his sixth Super Bowl and won his fourth championship when the Chiefs beat the 49ers 25–22.

Beginning with the 2024 season, Chiefs defensive players including Justin Reid popularized the expression "In Spags We Trust" to express their confidence in Spagnuolo's decisionmaking and leadership, and printed t-shirts featuring the phrase to wear ahead of that year's AFC championship game. Spagnuolo's defense was credited to the Chiefs finishing with a league-best 15–2 record, even as the offense quarterbacked by Patrick Mahomes had regressed. Spagnuolo reached his seventh Super Bowl, a rematch of Super Bowl LVII, where they fell to the Eagles 40–22. The Chiefs defense managed to stop star running back Saquon Barkley from scoring a touchdown but could not contain quarterback Jalen Hurts, despite sacking him four times.

== Coaching philosophy ==
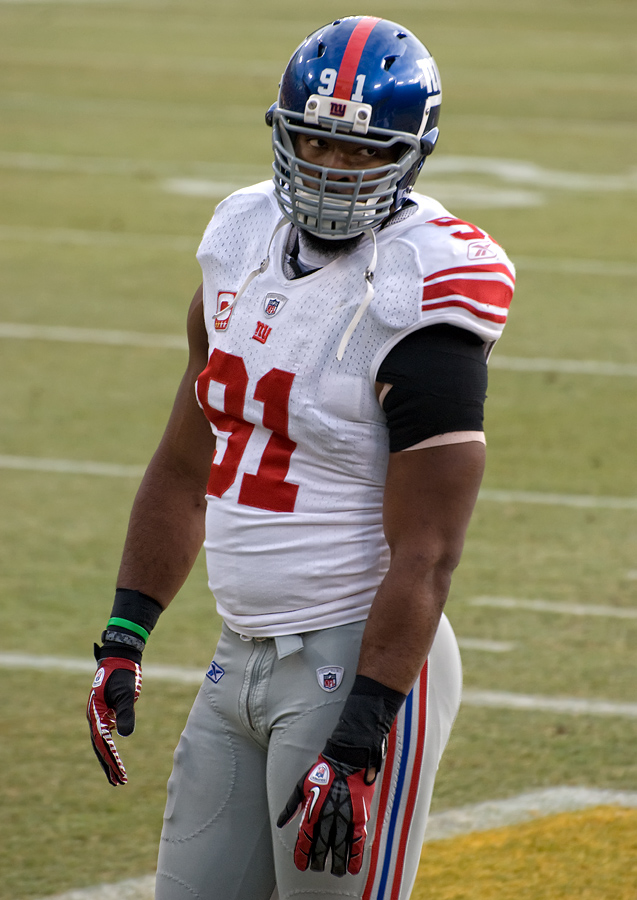
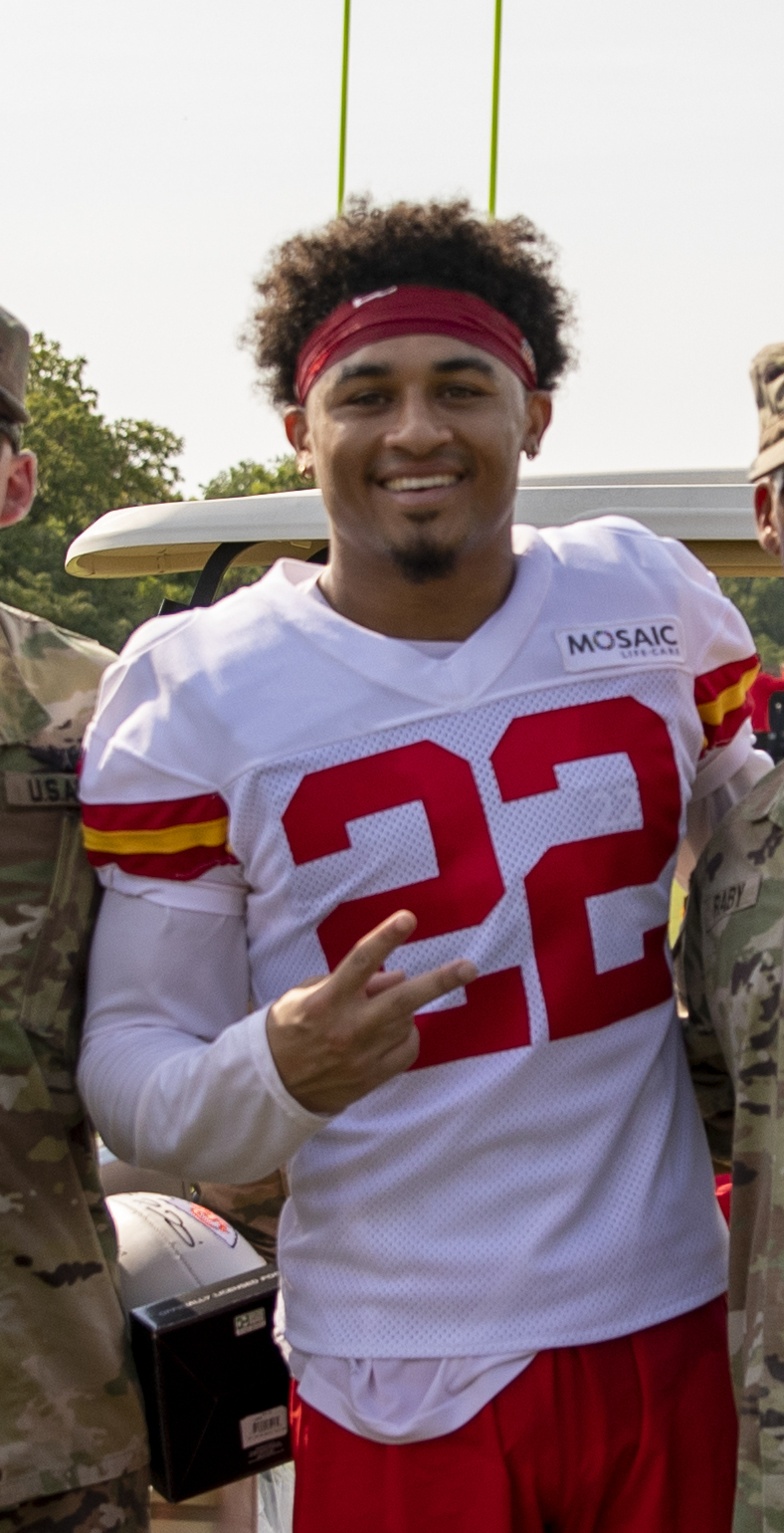
Spagnuolo is credited for developing multiple All-Pro defensive players throughout his career as a defensive coordinator, including New York Giants pass rusher Justin Tuck and Kansas City Chiefs cornerback Trent McDuffie.

Spagnuolo learned under Philadelphia defensive coach Jim Johnson, and shares the same aggressive, blitz-heavy approach as his mentor. However, Spagnuolo did not incorporate this philosophy during his time in New Orleans. Spagnuolo uses a 4–3 base defense with a heavy emphasis on multiple blitz packages, including corner and safety blitzes. While defensive coordinator of the New York Giants, he often used a smaller defensive line, with three or even four defensive ends to further pressure the quarterback.

This philosophy proved successful, with the Giants leading the NFL in sacks in 2007. In Super Bowl XLII, Spagnuolo's defense sacked Tom Brady five times, which was the most he had been sacked in any game that season.

== Head coaching record ==
Team	Year	Regular season					Postseason			
Team	Year	Won	Lost	Ties	Win %	Finish	Won	Lost	Win %	Result
STL	2009	1	15	0	.063	4th in NFC West	—	—	—	—
STL	2010	7	9	0	.438	2nd in NFC West	—	—	—	—
STL	2011	2	14	0	.125	4th in NFC West	—	—	—	—
STL total		10	38	0	.208		—	—	—	—
NYG*	2017	1	3	0	.250	4th in NFC East	—	—	—	—
Total		11	41	0	.212		—	—	—	—

*Interim head coach

== Personal life ==
Spagnuolo is a Catholic. He has been married to his wife Maria since 2005, with whom he has five children.
