= Ifeatu Melifonwu =

American football player (born 1999)

No. 5 – Tampa Bay Buccaneers
- Position: Safety
- Roster status: Active

Personal information
- Born: May 2, 1999 (age 27); Grafton, Massachusetts, U.S.
- Listed height: 6 ft 3 in (1.91 m)
- Listed weight: 210 lb (95 kg)

Career information
- High school: Grafton
- College: Syracuse (2017–2020)
- NFL draft: 2021: 3rd round, 101st overall pick

Career history
- Detroit Lions (2021–2024); Miami Dolphins (2025); Tampa Bay Buccaneers (2026–present)

Awards and highlights
- Second-team All-ACC (2020)

Career NFL statistics as of 2025
- Total tackles: 125
- Forced fumbles: 1
- Fumble recoveries: 2
- Sacks: 5.5
- Pass deflections: 14
- Interceptions: 3
- Stats at Pro Football Reference

Ifeatu Christian-David Melifonwu // (born May 2, 1999) is an American professional football safety for the Tampa Bay Buccaneers of the National Football League (NFL). He played college football for the Syracuse Orange and was selected by the Detroit Lions in the third round of the 2021 NFL draft.

== Early life ==
Melifonwu attended Grafton High School in Grafton, Massachusetts. He played defensive back, running back and wide receiver in high school. A standout athlete, Melifonwu also played basketball, ran track, and even played a year of lacrosse. Melifonwu committed to Syracuse University to play college football. He is of Nigerian descent.

== College career ==
Melifonwu played at Syracuse from 2017 to 2020. After redshirting his first year in 2017, he played in 29 games over the next three seasons. He finished his career with 88 tackles, three interceptions and one sack. After his junior season in 2020, he declared for the 2021 NFL draft.

== Professional career ==
Pre-draft measurables
Height	Weight	Arm length	Hand span	40-yard dash	10-yard split	20-yard split	20-yard shuttle	Three-cone drill	Vertical jump	Broad jump	Bench press
6 ft 2 1/2 in (1.89 m)	205 lb (93 kg)	32 1/4 in (0.82 m)	8 7/8 in (0.23 m)	4.48 s	1.48 s	2.57 s	4.36 s	7.01 s	41.5 in (1.05 m)	11 ft 2 in (3.40 m)	16 reps
All values from Pro Day

=== Detroit Lions ===
Melifonwu was drafted in the third round, 101st overall, by the Detroit Lions in the 2021 NFL Draft. Melifonwu signed his four-year rookie contract with Detroit on July 23, 2021. On September 22, Melifonwu was placed on injured reserve after suffering a thigh injury in Week 2. He was activated on November 29.

On June 1, 2022, Melifonwu started snaps as both a cornerback and a safety.

On December 24, 2023, Melifonwu intercepted a pass from Minnesota Vikings quarterback Nick Mullens to end the game, clinching the Lions' first division title since 1993, and the first NFC North title for the Lions.

In 2024, Melifonwu suffered an ankle injury during training camp, causing him to be placed on injured reserve. Mid-season when the Lions opened his 21-day practice window, he dislocated his finger keeping him out for another month. He was able to return at the end of the season and impact his team. In Week 16 against the Chicago Bears, he knocked down a pass on fourth down.

=== Miami Dolphins ===
On March 13, 2025, Melifonwu signed a one-year, $4 million contract with the Miami Dolphins. Melifonwu made 16 appearances (including eight starts) for the Dolphins during the regular season, recording one interception, one pass defended, one sack, and 53 combined tackles.

=== Tampa Bay Buccaneers ===
On July 30, 2026, Melifonwu signed with the Tampa Bay Buccaneers. Melifonwu was released by the Buccaneers as a part of final roster cuts on August 30; he was re-signed to the team's practice squad the following day. On September 30, Melifonwu was promoted to the active roster.

== NFL career statistics ==
Legend
**Bold**	Career high

=== Regular season ===
Year	Team	Games		Tackles					Interceptions						Fumbles				
Year	Team	GP	GS	Cmb	Solo	Ast	Sck	TFL	Int	Yds	Avg	Lng	TD	PD	FF	Fmb	FR	Yds	TD
2021	DET	7	4	15	12	3	0.0	0	0	0	0.0	0	0	3	0	0	**2**	0	0
2022	DET	10	1	14	9	5	0.5	1	0	0	0.0	0	0	2	0	0	0	0	0
2023	DET	17	6	33	24	9	**3.0**	**4**	**2**	**35**	**17.5**	**24**	0	**8**	**1**	0	0	0	0
2024	DET	3	3	10	8	2	1.0	1	0	0	0.0	0	0	0	0	0	0	0	0
2025	MIA	16	8	**53**	**31**	**22**	1.0	1	1	0	0.0	0	0	1	0	0	0	0	0
Career		53	22	125	84	41	5.5	7	3	35	11.7	24	0	14	1	0	2	0	0

=== Postseason ===
Year	Team	Games		Tackles					Interceptions						Fumbles				
Year	Team	GP	GS	Cmb	Solo	Ast	Sck	TFL	Int	Yds	Avg	Lng	TD	PD	FF	Fmb	FR	Yds	TD
2023	DET	3	3	**16**	**11**	**5**	**2.0**	**1**	0	0	0.0	0	0	0	0	0	0	0	0
2024	DET	1	1	2	0	2	0.0	0	0	0	0.0	0	0	0	0	0	0	0	0
Career		4	4	18	11	7	2.0	1	0	0	0.0	0	0	0	0	0	0	0	0

== Personal life ==
His brother, Obi Melifonwu, is also a football player.
