= Jerome Wheelock =

American inventor

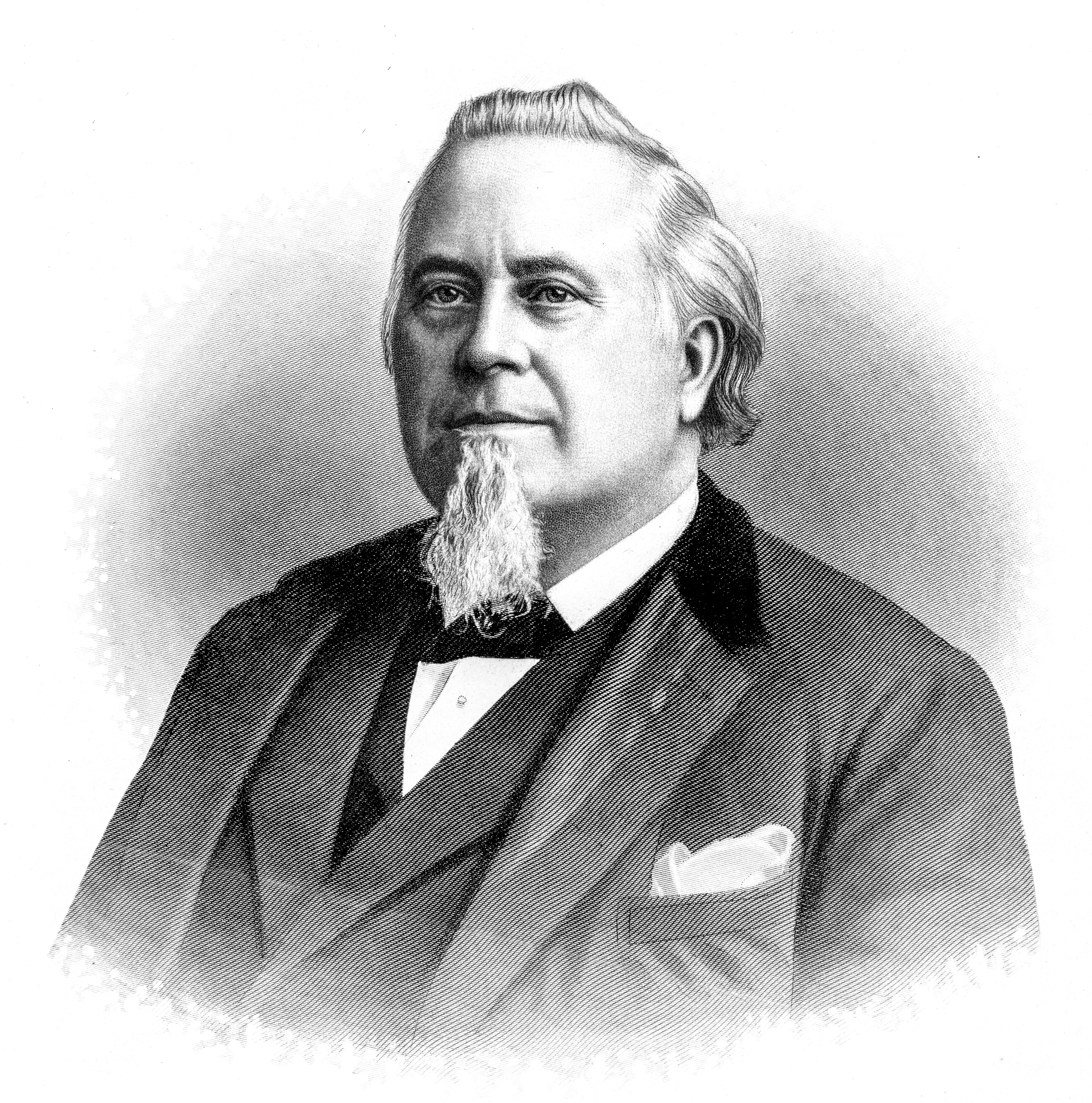
- Born: June 20, 1834; Grafton, Massachusetts
- Died: February 26, 1902 (aged 67); Worcester, Massachusetts
- Occupation: Inventor
- Known for: Wheelock steam cylinder packing
- Spouse: Lydia Ann Robinson

Signature
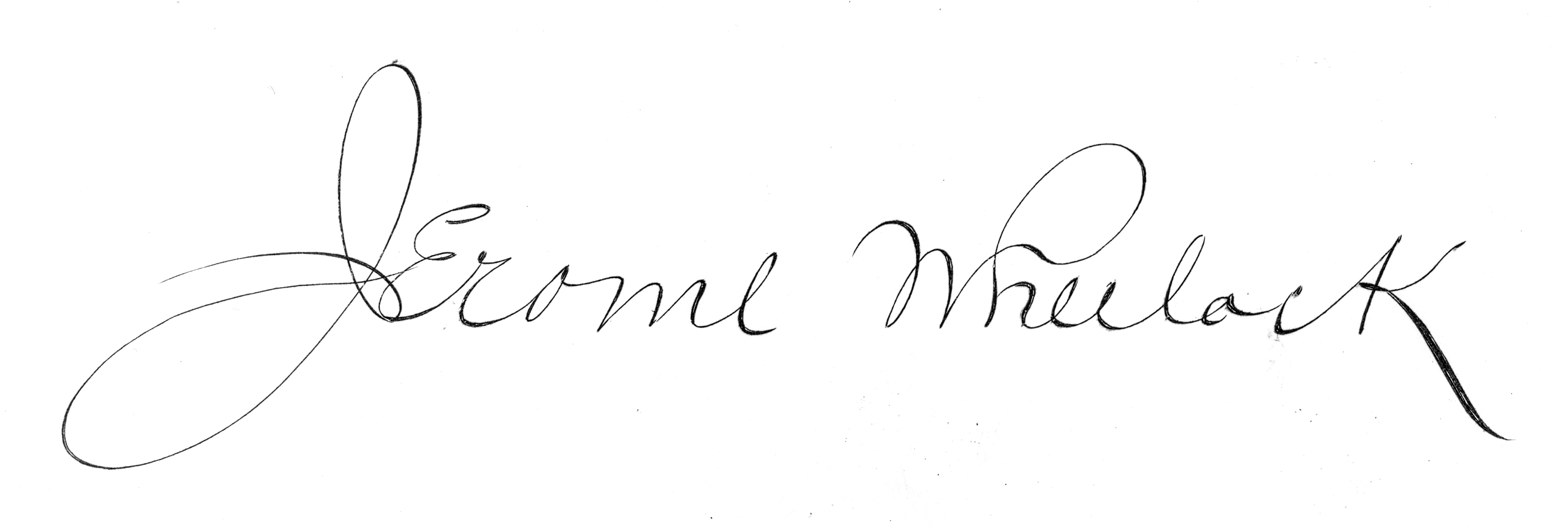

Jerome Wheelock (June 20, 1834 – February 26, 1902) was an American inventor best known for the Wheelock steam cylinder packing.

== Biography ==
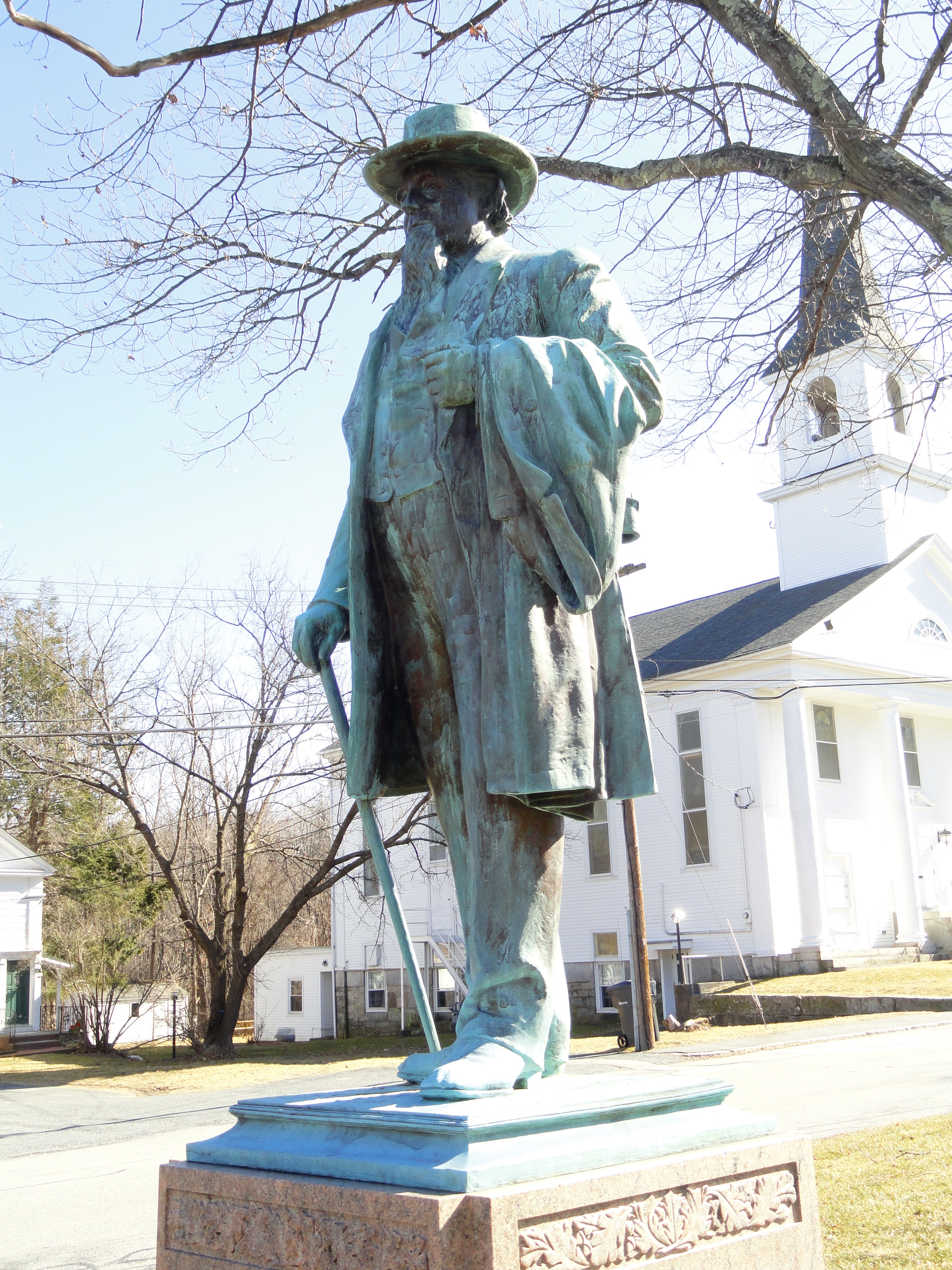
Memorial to Jerome Wheelock by sculptor Herbert Adams, in Grafton, Massachusetts

Wheelock was born in Grafton, Massachusetts, to Daniel and Susan Wheelock. While still young, he left home without telling his parents and his whereabouts were unknown until he was old enough to live on his own. With the help of Abraham M. Bigelow, he became an apprentice at Taunton Locomotive works, and left with the highest honors and recommendations. In 1858 he moved to Worcester and began working at Washburn Iron Works where he invented the Wheelock steam cylinder packing. He soon joined with Charles A. Wheeler to begin manufacturing this invention, and ultimately sold the company in 1888.

Wheelock invented several mechanisms to improve the steam engine, the most famous of which was his valve system. In 1875, the American Institution awarded him the Great Gold Medal of Progress, the only one given for a steam engine. The following year, he was given the medal and diploma of the 1876 Centennial Exhibition. At the International Exposition of 1878, he was awarded the grand prize, the only one given for a steam engine.

Wheelock married Lydia Ann Robinson in 1858 and had 2 sons, Harvey and Herbert. He died in Worcester in 1902. His will left $100,000 to build a town hall or library, some of which funds went to build the Grafton Public Library in 1927. He also gave $100,000 to erect a bronze statue of himself, which still stands in Grafton today. He gave a further $100,000 to Harvard and Clark University to be held as the Jerome Wheelock fund.
