= Bren Bataclan =

Filipino-American artist

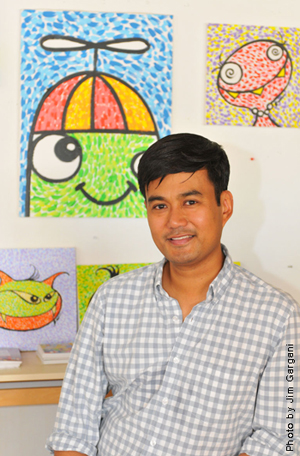
- Bren Bataclan
- Born: Makati, Philippines
- Education: UCLA (BA); Ohio State University (MA)
- Occupation: Artist
- Known for: Project Smile; Fe, A Traumatized Son’s Graphic Memoir
- Website: bataclan.com

Bren Bataclan is a Filipino-American artist. The creator of the street art project Project Smile, he has left more than 3000 anime-inspired paintings in public spaces for passers-by to take for free if they "promise to smile at random people more often." He has given his paintings away in 80 countries and in every state in the US.

== Early life and education ==
Bataclan was born in the Philippines and moved to Daly City, California with his family when he was 12. As a child, he watched the Giant Robot television shows Voltes V and Mazinger which later inspired his art. He received a BA in design at UCLA and an MA in computer animation at the Ohio State University.

== Career ==
Bataclan began his career teaching design and computer animation at UMass Amherst. He became a fulltime artist in 2003 with the launch of Project Smile. In addition to the Project Smile paintings, Bataclan has painted murals at more than 300 schools, hospitals and community institutions.

In 2021, Bataclan's book, Fe: A Traumatized Son’s Graphic Memoir, was published by Philippine American Writers and Artists, Inc (PAWA, Inc.). Focused on Bataclan's relationship with his mother, NPR wrote that Fe was a "brilliant, sensitive story of a mother and son." An elementary school textbook about his artwork was published by Heinemann Press.

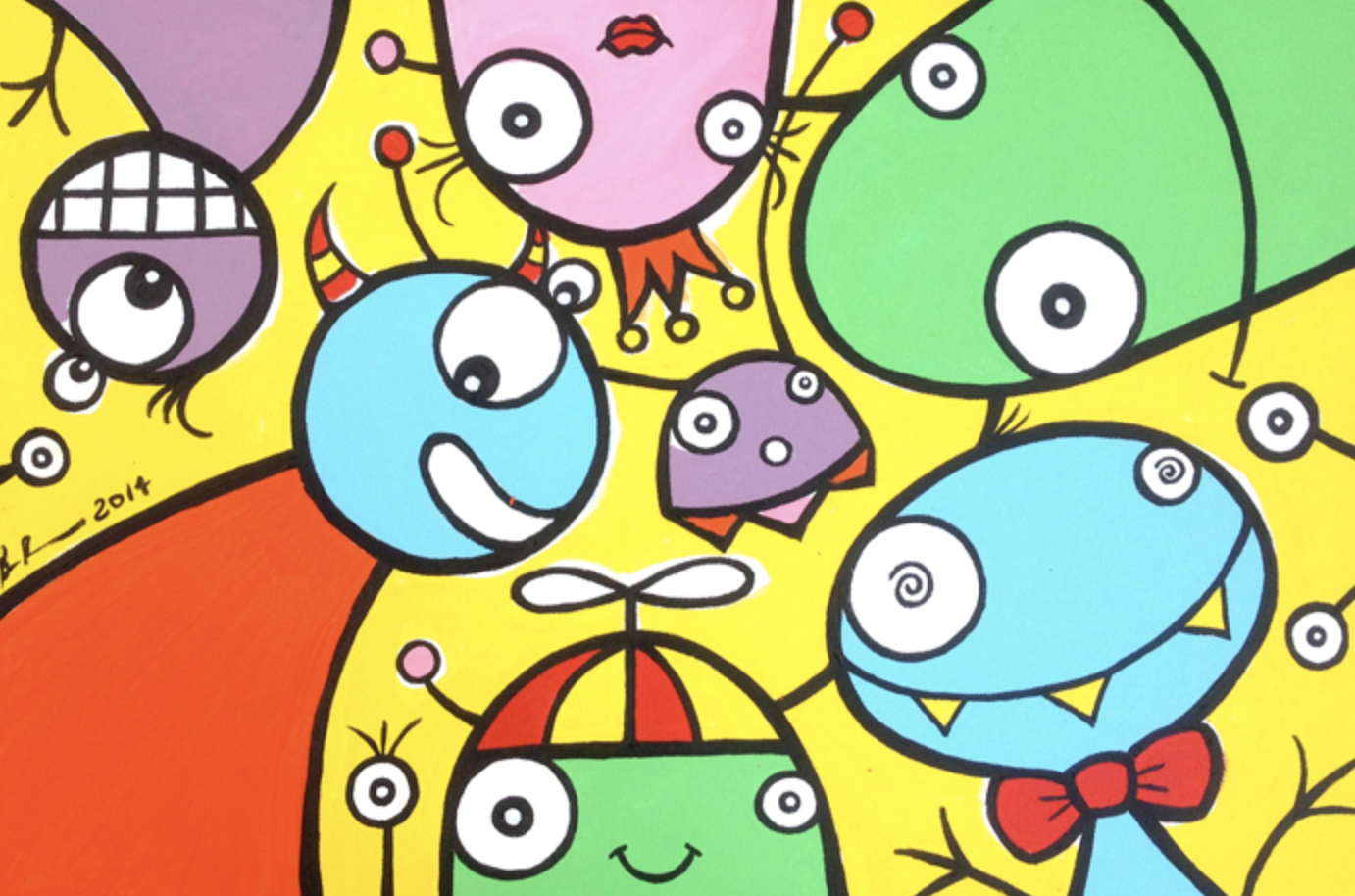
"All the Gang" by Bren Bataclan, 2013

In 2023 he was named Artist Fellow with the Cultural Diplomacy Initiative at the Fletcher School of Law and Diplomacy at Tufts University.

== Personal life ==
Bataclan and his husband, Bob Parlin, live in Cambridge. They filed for a marriage license on the day same sex-marriage in Massachusetts was legally recognized and were married at the Old Cambridge Baptist Church in 2004.
