= Grafton Public Library (Grafton, Massachusetts) =

Coordinates: 42°12′23.14″N 71°41′06.33″W

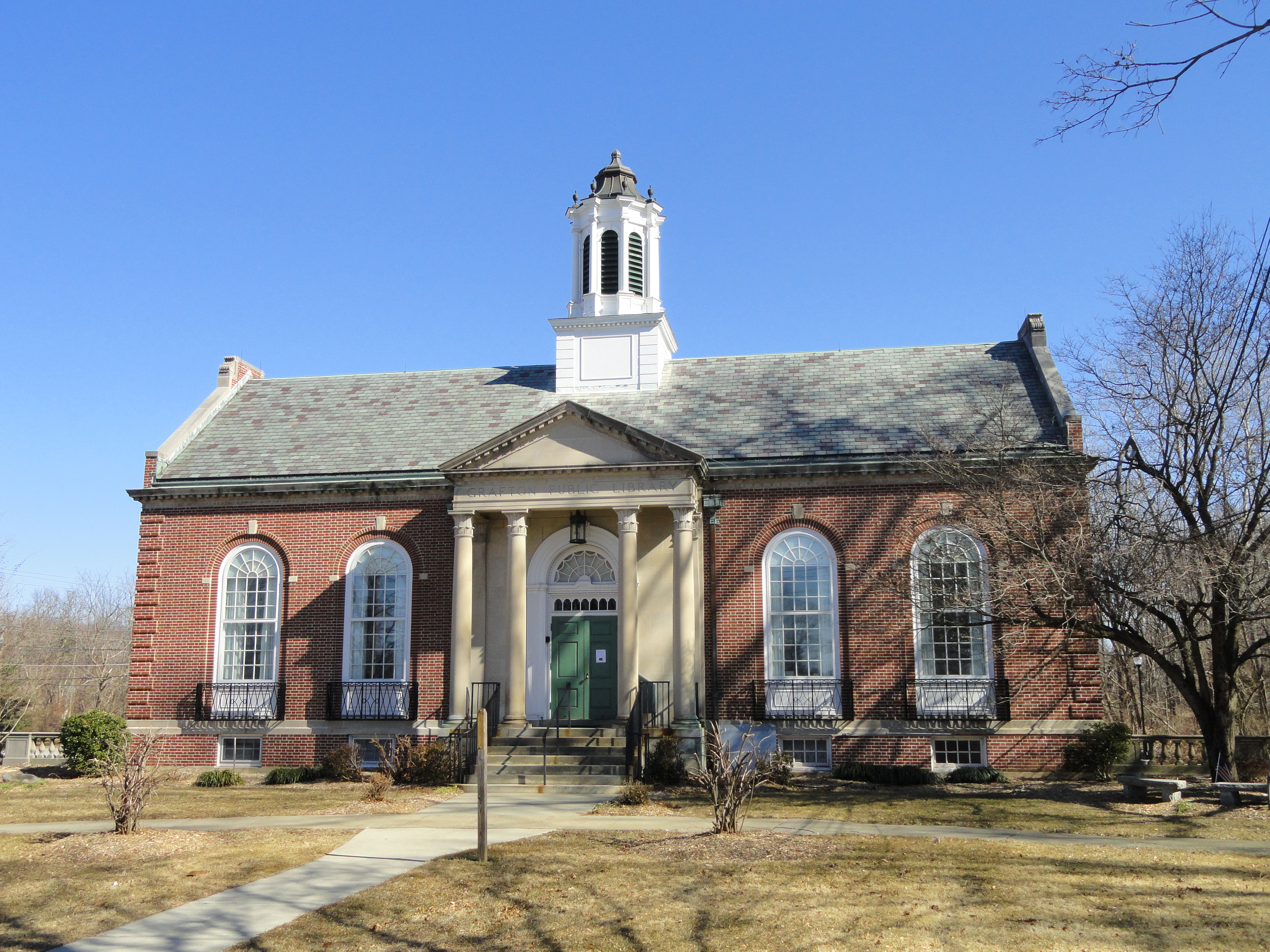
- Grafton Public Library
- Location: Grafton, Massachusetts, United States
- Established: 1927

Other information
- Director: TBD
- Website: graftonlibrary.org

Grafton Public Library is located in Grafton, Massachusetts. The building was built in 1927 with money donated by Jerome Wheelock, a local inventor. The 2009 population estimate is over 17,700.

GPL belongs to Massachusetts Library System (MLS) and Central/Western Massachusetts Automated Resource Sharing, Inc. (C/W MARS).

== Services ==
GPL offers storytimes; programs for all ages, community service opportunities, and a home delivery program for residents who cannot use the facility for physical reasons.

Grafton residents who have library cards are eligible to borrow museum passes to various regional museums and parks.

The Friends of Grafton Public Library hold fundraisers and sponsor the Down Under Bookstore.

Internet access, wifi, and word processing are available to the public.

== Director and trustees ==
One director oversees the library, and there nineteen other employees, both part-time and full-time. The trustees are elected from within the community and help oversee operations.
