= Citizen Pinoy =

- Title card
- Genre: Public service; Talk show
- Directed by: Sam Simbulan
- Presented by: Michael J. Gurfinkel
- Country of origin: Philippines
- Original languages: English; Tagalog

Production
- Camera setup: Multiple-camera setup
- Running time: 22 minutes
- Production company: ABS-CBN News and Current Affairs

Original release
- Network: The Filipino Channel
- Release: 2005 – present

Citizen Pinoy is a Philippine television public service and talk show broadcast by The Filipino Channel. Hosted by Michael J. Gurfinkel, it premiered in 2005.

The program specializes in helping the Filipino community deal with immigration problems from here in North America all the way back to the Philippines. The show has featured many people who have dealt with problems in becoming an American citizen from the common and Filipino celebrities.
