= Grafton, Massachusetts =

- Town
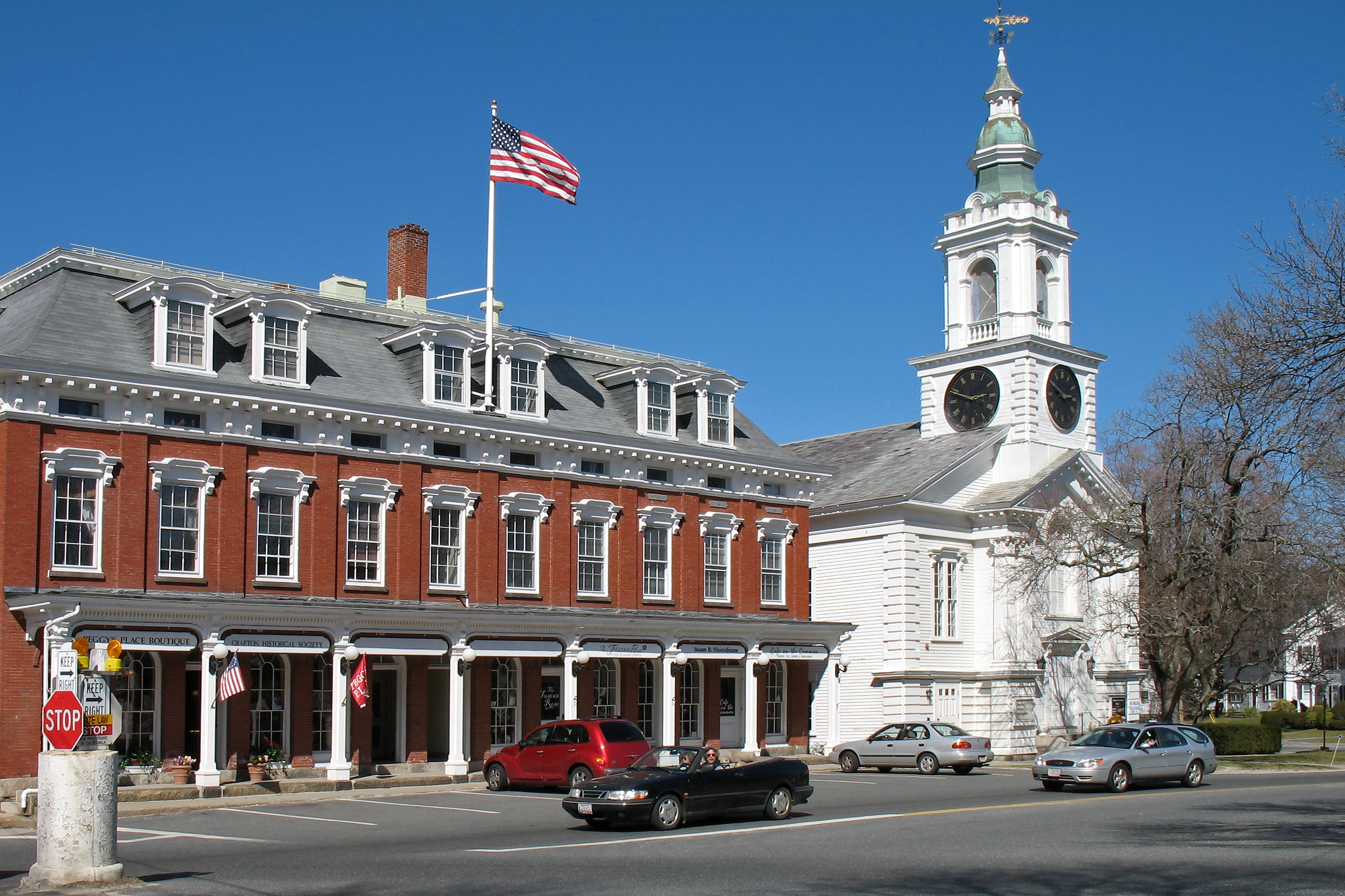
- Grafton center in 2006

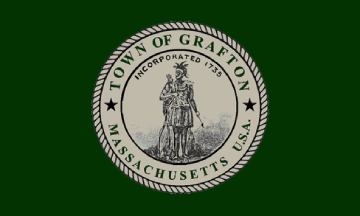
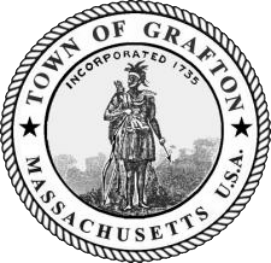
- Flag Seal

- Location in Worcester County and the state of Massachusetts.
- Coordinates: 42°12′25″N 71°41′10″W
- Country: United States
- State: Massachusetts
- County: Worcester
- Settled: 1718
- Incorporated: 1735
- Named for: Charles FitzRoy, 2nd Duke of Grafton

Government
  - Type: Open town meeting
  - Town Administrator: Evan Brassard
  - Select Board: Andy Jefferson; Craig Dauphinais; Victoria Duckworth; Colleen Roy; Ann Marie Foley
  - Town Moderator: Dawn Anderson

Area
  - Total: 23.3 sq mi (60.3 km^{2})
  - Land: 22.7 sq mi (58.9 km^{2})
  - Water: 0.54 sq mi (1.4 km^{2})
- Elevation: 430 ft (130 m)

Population (2020)
  - Total: 19,664
  - Density: 865/sq mi (334/km^{2})
- Time zone: UTC−5 (Eastern)
  - Summer (DST): UTC−4 (Eastern)
- ZIP Codes: 01519 (Grafton); 01536 (North Grafton); 01560 (South Grafton)
- Area code: 508/774
- FIPS code: 25-26430
- GNIS feature ID: 0619480
- Website: www.grafton-ma.gov

Grafton is a town in Worcester County, Massachusetts, United States. The population was 19,664 at the 2020 census. The town consists of the North Grafton, Grafton, and South Grafton geographic areas, each with a separate ZIP Code. Incorporated in 1735, the town is home to a Nipmuc village known as Hassanamisco Reservation, the Willard House and Clock Museum, Community Harvest Project, and the Tufts University Cummings School of Veterinary Medicine.

== History ==
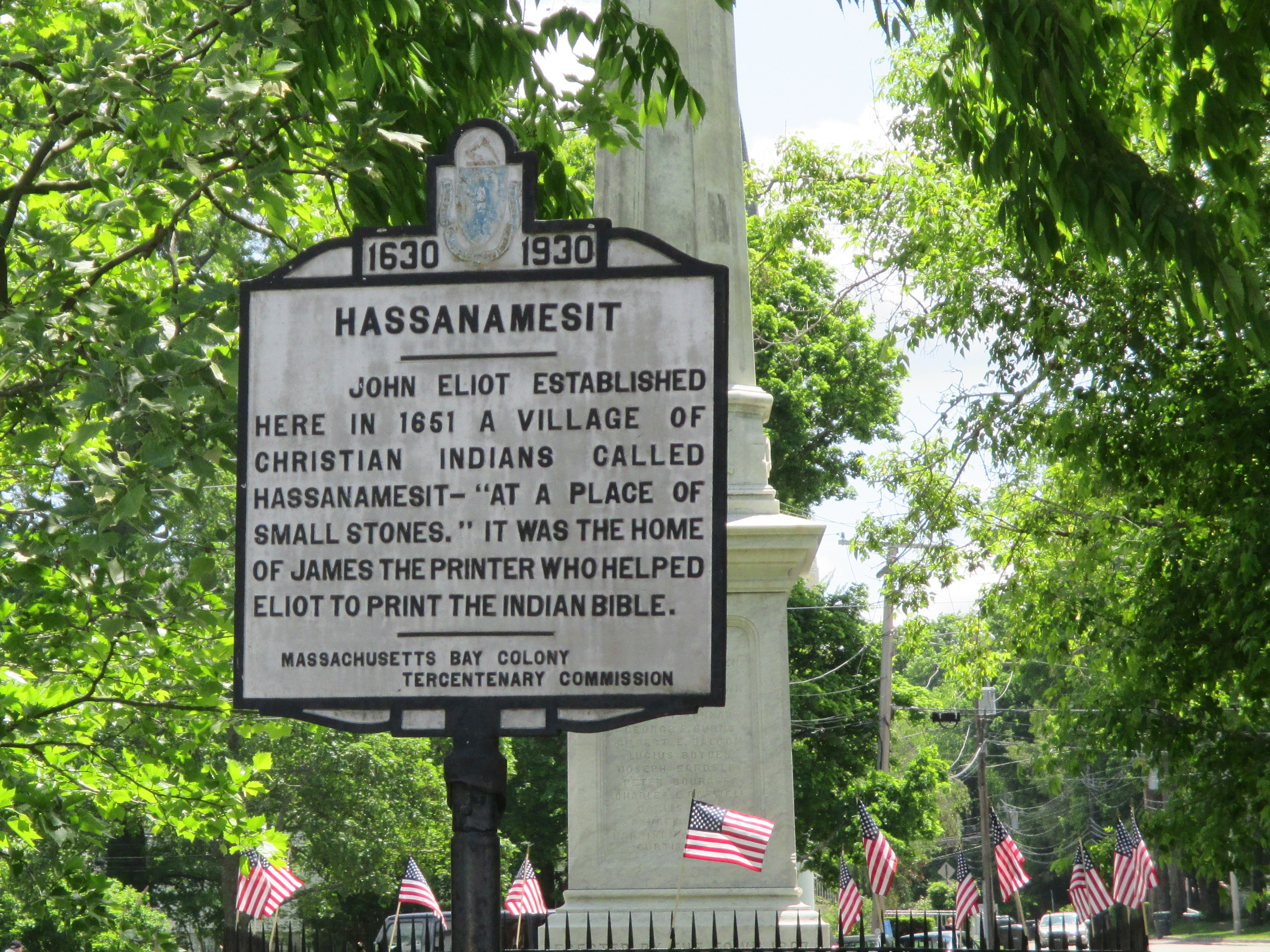
Hassanamesit Marker

Bands of the Nipmuc tribe are the indigenous inhabitants, and maintain a state-recognized reservation known as Hassanamesit, or Hassanamisco, which was formerly a Praying Indian village from 1647 when the Reverend John Eliot came and converted the Hassanamiscos to Christianity . in 1727 the Hassanamesit reservation of 8,000 acres was divided into 7,500 acres to 40 English proprietors and 500 acres to 7 Nipmuc proprietors. This became Grafton, officially incorporated in 1735.

Grafton stands tall in the industrialization of the Blackstone Valley. Its Northeast Village was once known as "New England Village". The following is an excerpt from the Blackstone Daily about the history of the town:

Grafton has been a significant contributor in the success and progress of the American Industrial Revolution that was started in 1793 by Samuel Slater with his cotton mill in Pawtucket [Rhode Island]. North Grafton's Upper Mill, now known as the Washington Mills complex, that still produces abrasives, was once known as the New England Manufacturing Company. This was part of the New England Village, as North Grafton was known for generations. This part of the mill was built in 1826 and was part of a much larger complex, but most of that is now gone, mainly due to serious fires. Mill housing was built at 12, 14 and 16 Overlook Street. These central-chimney-style homes were boarding houses with ornate trim that has since been lost.

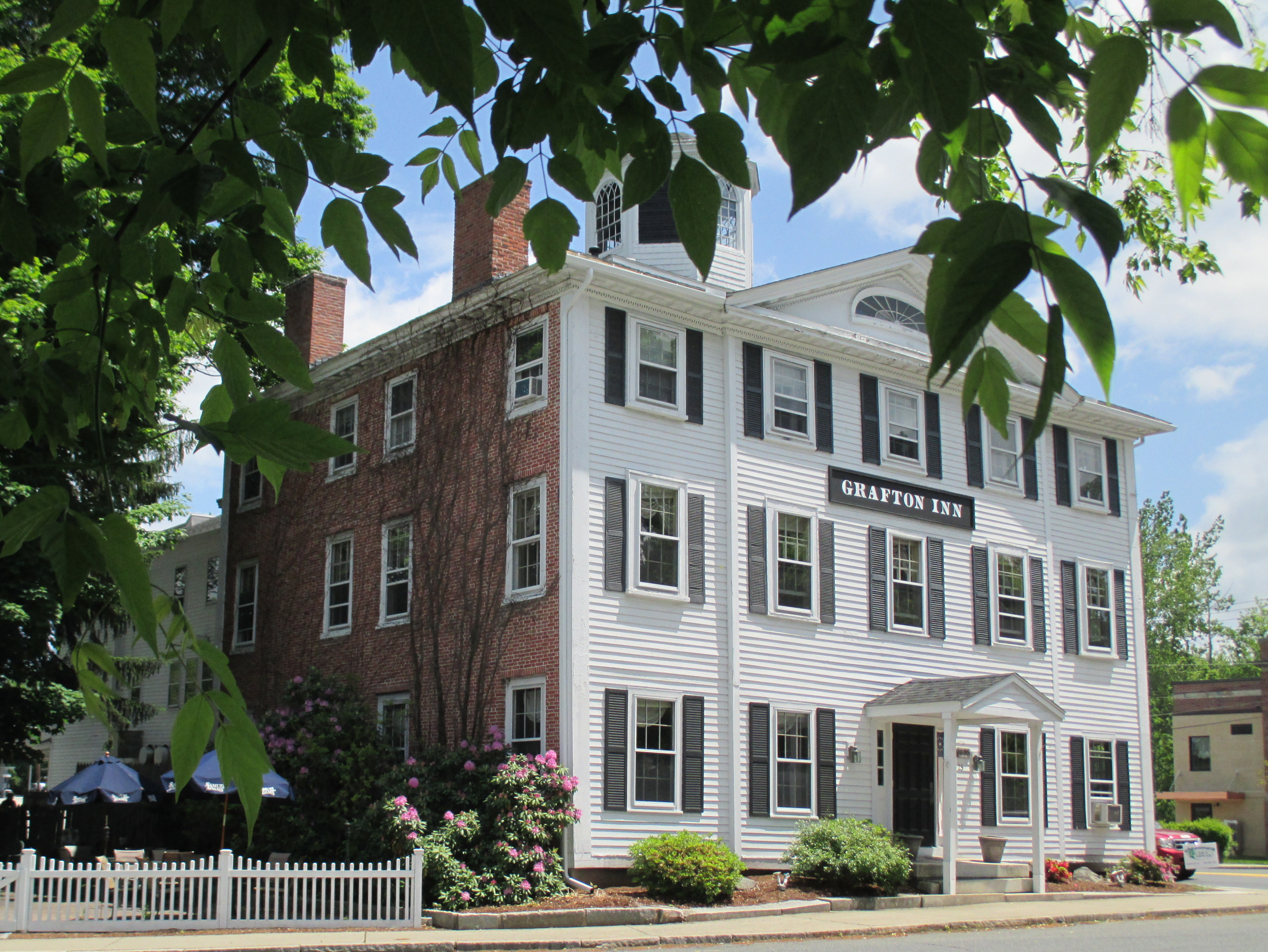
Grafton Inn

The town is named for Charles FitzRoy, 2nd Duke of Grafton, a title created for the illegitimate son of King Charles II of England. Ethan Allen ran a gun factory in Grafton in the early 19th century. In the 1930s, a movie, Ah, Wilderness!, was filmed in the town. The moviemakers built a bandstand on the town common, which has remained standing since (though has gone under many refurbishments since). Grafton Common has many historic homes, churches and buildings and is considered the most quintessential common in the Blackstone Valley. The town is part of the Blackstone River Valley National Heritage Corridor, the oldest industrialized region in the U.S.

North Grafton is the home of the Wyman Gordon Company. In 1955, the United States Air Force installed a 50,000-ton metal forge in North Grafton as part of its Heavy Press Program in a plant operated by Wyman-Gordon. It was the largest metal forge, and indeed the largest machine, in the world at the time it was built. This forge is used to form strategic metals used in commercial and military aircraft for turbine disks, shafts, and blades, landing struts and other aircraft parts where light weight and extreme strength are needed. The entire undercarriage of the Space Shuttles was forged in Grafton of magnesium.

From 1901 to 1973, North Grafton was home to the Grafton State Hospital. Originally an offshoot of the Worcester State Hospital, Grafton State Hospital served as a "farm colony" where chronically insane patients could live and work in somewhat normal surroundings. The campus was made up of several clusters of buildings and eventually encompassed 1,200 acres (490 ha) in Grafton, Shrewsbury, and Westborough. The hospital was closed in 1973, and the campus, including many of the original buildings, was taken over by the Cummings School of Veterinary Medicine (part of Tufts University) and the Grafton Job Corps center. The Tupperware company was founded in South Grafton in 1938.

One hundred ninety acres of the Hassanamessit Woods, believed to contain the remains of the praying village were under agreement for development for more than 100 homes. This property has significant cultural importance to the Nipmuc Tribal Nation because it is thought to contain the meetinghouse and the center of the old praying village. However, The Trust for Public Land, the town of Grafton, the Grafton Land Trust, the Nipmuc Nation and the state of Massachusetts intervened. The Trust for Public Land purchased the property and kept it off the market until 2004, after sufficient funding was procured to permanently protect the property. The property also has ecological significance as it is adjacent to 187 acres of Grafton owned land as well as 63 acres owned by the Grafton Land Trust. These properties will provide numerous recreational benefits to the public as well as play a role in protecting the water quality of local watersheds.

== Geography ==
According to the United States Census Bureau, the town has a total area of 23.3 square miles (60 km^{2}), of which 22.7 square miles (59 km^{2}) is land and 0.5 square miles (1.3 km^{2}), or 2.28%, is water. Grafton is located 40 miles (64 km) west of Boston and 5 miles (8.0 km) southeast of Worcester. Grafton includes North Grafton, Grafton, and South Grafton, as well as many other industrial revolution era villages due to its long history on the Blackstone River, including Farnumsville, Fisherville, Saundersville and Axtell Corner. The town borders on Shrewsbury, Westborough, Upton, Northbridge, Sutton, Millbury and the city of Worcester.

== Demographics ==
Historical population
Year	Pop.	±%
1790	872	—
1850	3,904	+347.7%
1860	4,317	+10.6%
1870	4,594	+6.4%
1880	4,030	−12.3%
1890	5,002	+24.1%
1900	4,869	−2.7%
1910	5,705	+17.2%
1920	6,887	+20.7%
1930	7,030	+2.1%
1940	7,457	+6.1%
1950	8,281	+11.1%
1960	10,627	+28.3%
1970	11,659	+9.7%
1980	11,238	−3.6%
1990	13,035	+16.0%
2000	14,894	+14.3%
2010	17,765	+19.3%
2020	19,664	+10.7%
2025*	21,043	+7.0%
* = population estimate. Source: United States census records and Population Estimates Program data.

By the 2010 census, the population had reached 17,765.

As of the census of 2000, there were 14,894 people, 5,694 households, and 3,951 families residing in the town. The population density was 655.0 inhabitants per square mile (252.9/km^{2}). There were 5,828 housing units at an average density of 256.3 per square mile (99.0/km^{2}). The racial makeup of the town was 95.92% White, 1.25% African American, 0.11% Native American, 1.45% Asian, 0.24% from other races, and 1.03% from two or more races. Hispanic or Latino residents of any race were 1.91% of the population.

There were 5,694 households, out of which 34.1% had children under the age of 18 living with them, 58.1% were married couples living together, 8.5% had a female householder with no husband present, and 30.6% were non-families. 24.6% of all households were made up of individuals, and 8.1% had someone living alone who was 65 years of age or older. The average household size was 2.54 and the average family size was 3.07.

In the town, the population was spread out, with 25.8% under the age of 18, 7.2% from 18 to 24, 33.5% from 25 to 44, 22.3% from 45 to 64, and 11.2% who were 65 years of age or older. The median age was 36 years. For every 100 females, there were 93.5 males. For every 100 females age 18 and over, there were 89.3 males.

The median income for a household in the town was $56,020, and the median income for a family was $66,396. Males had a median income of $48,016 versus $32,347 for females. The per capita income for the town was $26,952. About 2.3% of families and 5.6% of the population were below the poverty line, including 1.6% of those under age 18 and 6.1% of those ages 65 or over.

== Government ==
State government
State Representative(s):	David K. Muradian, Jr. (R)
State Senator(s):	Michael O. Moore (D)
Governor's Councilor(s):	Paul M. DePalo (D)
Federal government
U.S. Representative(s):	James McGovern (D—Massachusetts's 2nd congressional district)
U.S. Senators:	Elizabeth Warren (D), Ed Markey (D)

== Transportation ==
Grafton station in North Grafton is served by the MBTA Commuter Rail Framingham/Worcester Line. The Worcester Regional Transit Authority operates public bus service in Grafton. The Grafton Senior Center provides low-cost or free transportation to residents who are over the age of 60 or disabled.

The Grafton and Upton Railroad operates freight service between North Grafton and Milford.

== Library ==
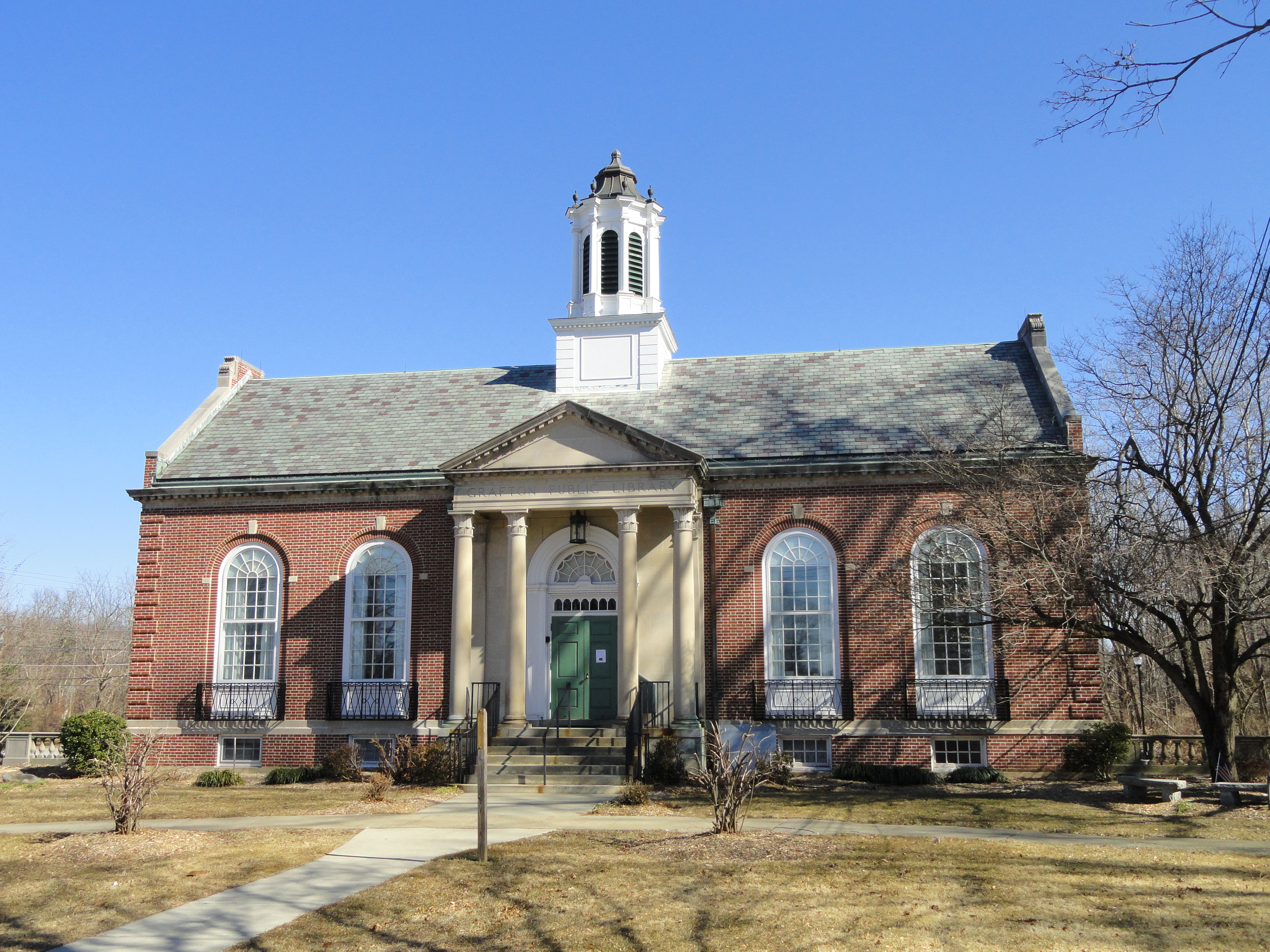
Grafton Public Library

The Grafton Free Public Library opened in 1867. The current building was built in 1927 with money donated by Jerome Wheelock, a local inventor. The facility was expanded to 26,000 s.f. in 2019.

== Education ==
Grafton is home to six public schools. Students are separated by whether they live in North or South Grafton until middle school. The High school mascot is the Grafton Gators.

- North Grafton Elementary School: grades K–1
- South Grafton Elementary School: grades K–1
- Millbury Street Elementary School: grades 2–6
- North Street Elementary School: grades 2–6
- Grafton Middle School: grades 7–8
- Grafton High School: grades 9–12

== Media ==
=== Newspapers ===
- "The Community Advocate". Archived from the original on December 1, 2017.

== Notable people ==
- John Grover, who left in 1798 and Grafton, Ontario was named for his hometown
- Nicholas A. Basbanes (born 1943), journalist, author and lecturer
- Dave Bayley, music producer and frontman of English band Glass Animals
- Hugh Bradley (1885-1949), Red Sox first baseman who in 1912 hit the first home run at Fenway Park
- Zara Cisco Brough (1919-1988), engineer and Nipmuc Native activist
- Robert Catalanotti (born 1958), United States Army Reserve Major general
- Israel Chapin (1740-1795), Revolutionary War general
- Nicholas Gage (born 1939), journalist, writer and film producer
- George W. Hammond (1833–1908), businessman
- Pearl A. Harwood (1903–1998), librarian and children's book author
- Titus Hutchinson (1771-1857), judge and abolitionist
- Joel Hills Johnson (1802–1883), inventor, Mormon pioneer, published poet and gospel hymn writer, Utah politician, founded the Utah towns of Enoch and Johnson
- Obi Melifonwu (born 1994), American football safety, currently a free agent
- Ifeatu Melifonwu (born 1999), American football defensive back for the Tampa Bay Buccaneers
- Gordon M. Nelson (1941-1993), chairman of the Massachusetts Republican State Committee from 1976 to 1980
- Frank O'Hara (1926–1966), avant-garde poet and playwright
- Marc Orrell (born 1982), former guitarist for the band Dropkick Murphys
- Steve Spagnuolo (born 1959), former head coach of the St. Louis Rams, currently the defensive coordinator for the Kansas City Chiefs
- Earl Tupper (1907-1983), a New Hampshire native, who pioneered Tupperware in Farnumsville, South Grafton in the 1940s
- Jerome Wheelock (1834-1902), inventor
- John Adams Whipple (1822-1891), pioneer photographer and inventor
- Simon Willard (1753-1848) and his brothers, clock makers

== See also ==
- Grafton Public Library (Grafton, Massachusetts)
- Grafton State Hospital
- Grafton (MBTA station)
- Farnumsville Historic District
- Fisherville Historic District
