= World Dog Surfing Championships =

Annual dog surfing contest in California

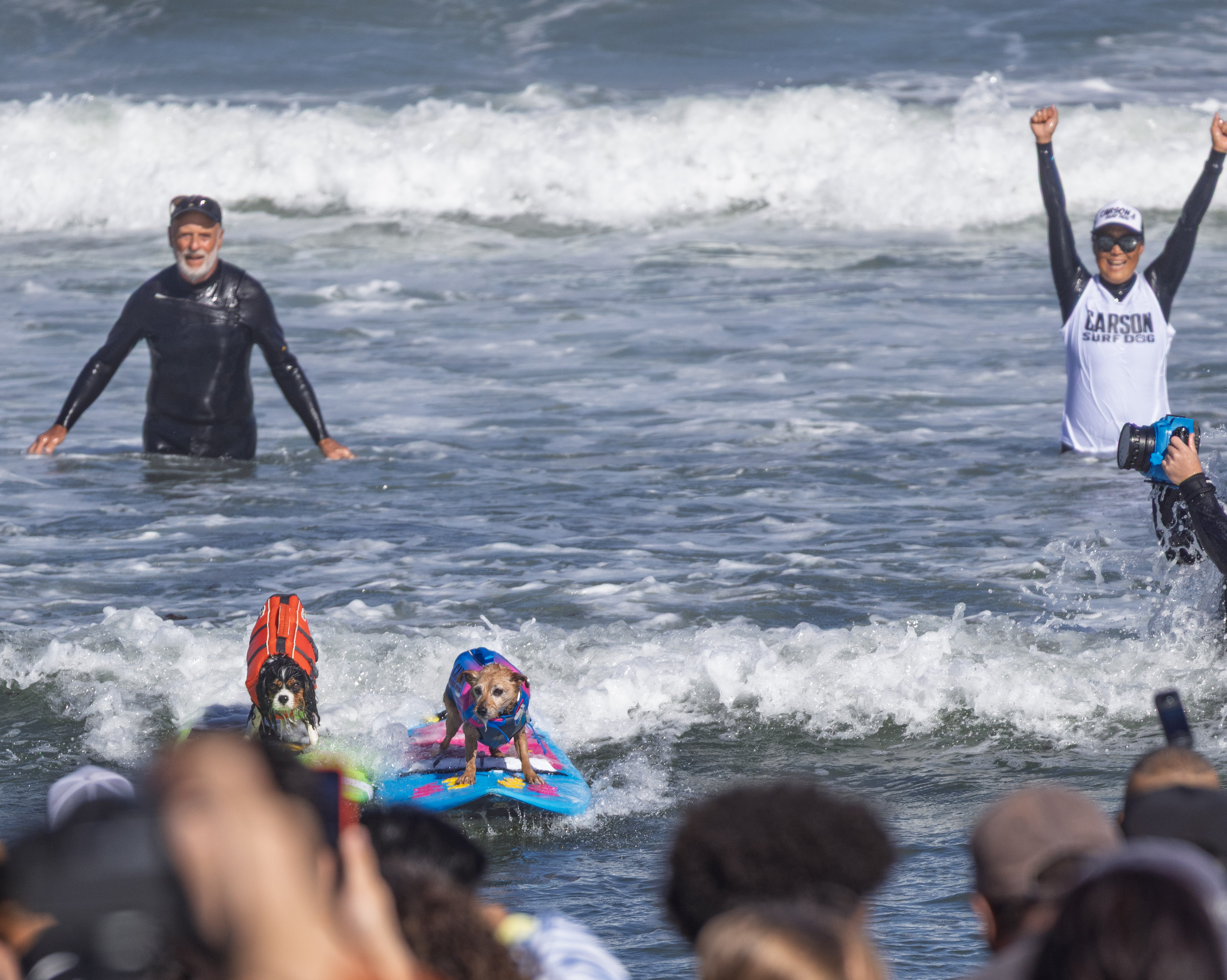
- World Dog Surfing Championships 2026
- Status: Active
- Frequency: Annual
- Venue: Linda Mar Beach; Pacifica, California, US
- Years active: 10
- Inaugurated: September 10, 2016
- Most recent: August 1, 2026
- Attendance: est. 6,000 (2024)
- Major events: Dog surfing
- Organizer: TasteTV
- Website: surfdogchampionships.com

The World Dog Surfing Championships, officially the Norcal Dog Surfing event & World Championships, (Note: Many dog surfing contests in Southern California also call themselves world championships; Steve Rubenstein, "Surfing dogs show up to ride the waves at Pacifica beach", San Francisco Chronicle, August 5, 2017.) is an annual dog surfing contest in Northern California, organized by TasteTV. It takes place at Linda Mar Beach in Pacifica; the inaugural event, in 2016, was held in September, but in its second year it moved to early August. Livestreamed events were scheduled for September 2020 and October 2021 because of the COVID-19 pandemic. World Dog Surfing Championships Best Waves is an associated annual TV compilation on ESPN2 that began in 2023 with tapes from the 2021 championships.

== Competition ==
The surfing contest is divided into up to four dog weight classes, plus a tandem dog and a tandem dog and human contest. There are also a fetch contest and a fashion show. Dogs surf with the assistance of a human who selects the wave or waves for the dog to ride. In the non-tandem portion of the contest, first, second, and third place are awarded in each weight class based on ride length, technique, and attitude as well as wave size during a ten-minute heat, and the top two dogs in each class then compete for the Top All-Around Surfing Championship Awards. The event raises money for animal, surfing, and environmental charities.

== History ==
=== 2016 ===
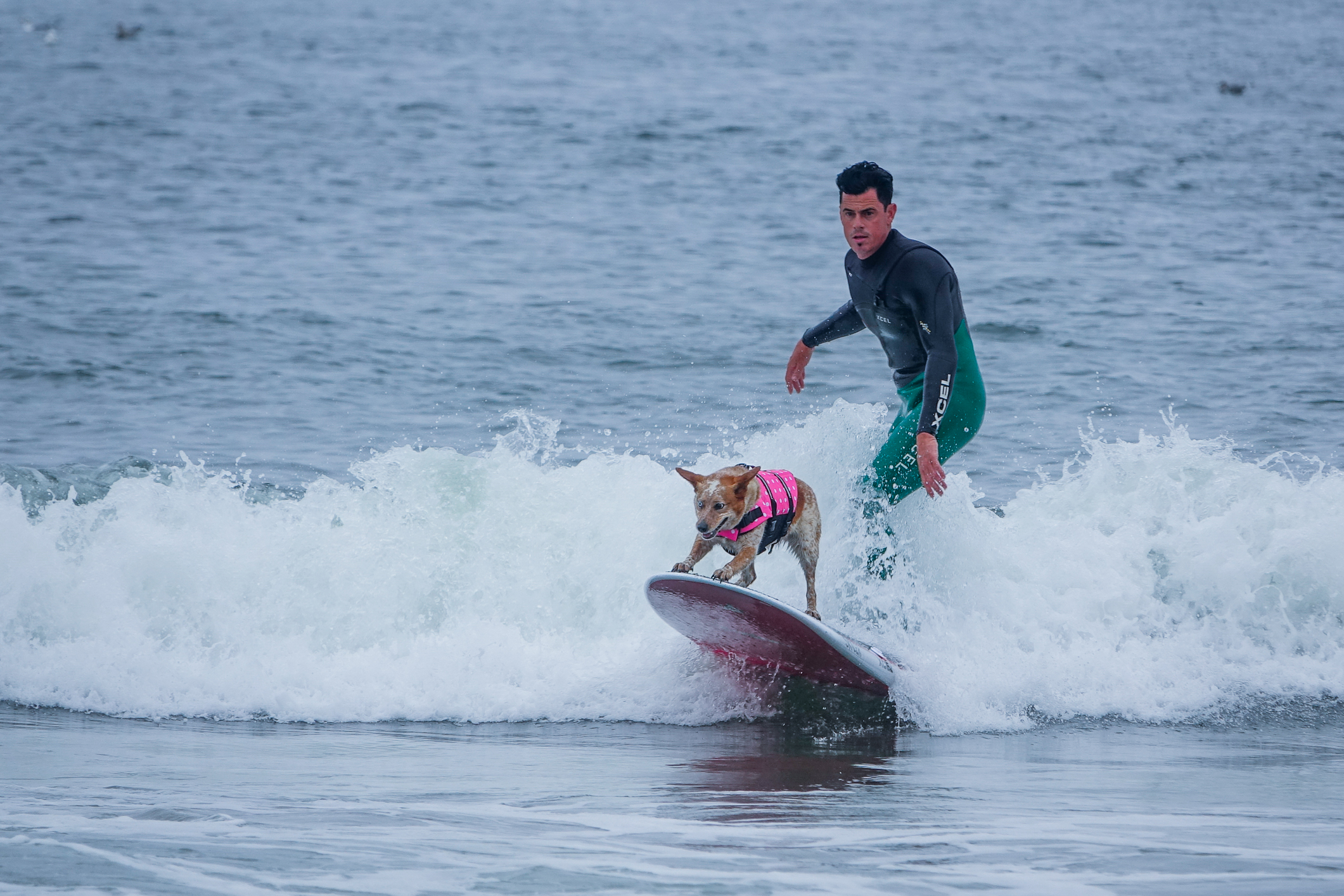
2016 World Dog Surfing Championships

The first World Dog Surfing Championships, the first dog surfing event in Northern California, took place on September 10, 2016, at Linda Mar Beach in Pacifica, California. Only five dogs competed, in two weight classes; Abbie Girl, an Australian Kelpie originally rescued through Humane Society Silicon Valley, won the overall competition over her friend Brandy, a Pug.

=== 2017 ===
The second annual championship event was held on August 5, 2017. There were three dozen entrants; Abbie again won the overall prize, with Sampson, a Spaniel, second. Humpback whales breached offshore during the surfing. Video of Simon McCoy's unenthusiastic presentation of the story for BBC News was widely shared.

=== 2018 ===
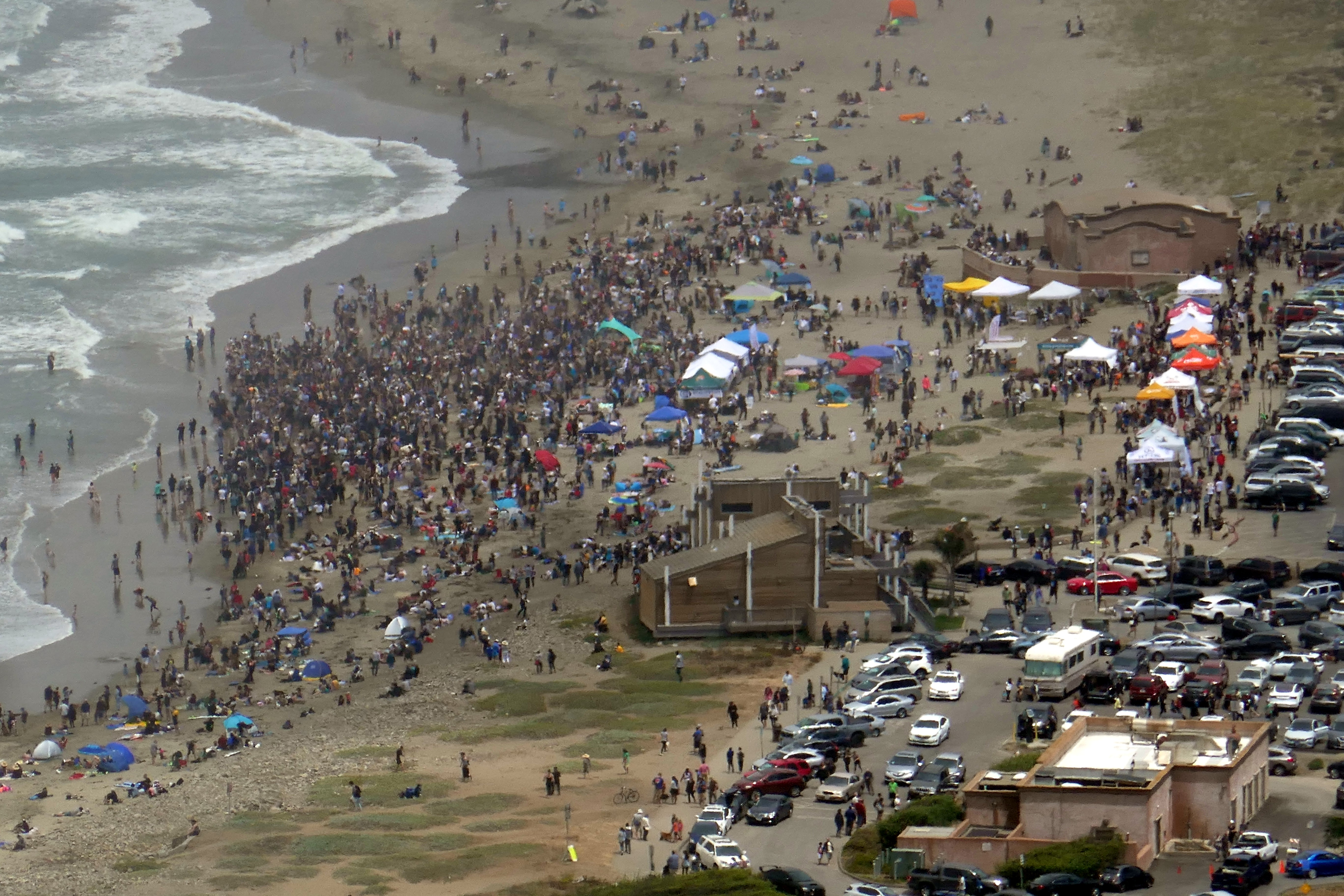
Aerial view of Linda Mar Beach during the 2018 championships

At the 2018 event, held on August 4, there were 45 contestants. Gidget, a Pug, won Top Dog and Abbie Girl, whose owner competed with one foot in a cast, received the newly added Spirit of Surfing Award; Shredder of the Year and All Heart awards were also introduced for the first time.

=== 2019 ===
The 2019 event took place on August 3, with approximately 50 contestants. Cherie, a French Bulldog from Newport Beach, won the Medium Surf Dogs and Top Dogs awards.

=== 2020 ===
The 2020 championships, scheduled for August 1, were postponed until 2021 because of the COVID-19 pandemic. A livestream hybrid event took place on September 26, using Zoom for live heats.

=== 2021 ===
The in-person championships scheduled for August 28, 2021 in Pacifica were again postponed because of the COVID-19 pandemic; livestreamed championships were scheduled for October 2.

=== 2022 ===
The 2022 event was held at Linda Mar beach in Pacifica on August 6. The Top Dog award was won by Skyler, a Cattle Dog from Santa Cruz.

=== 2023 ===
The 2023 championships took place on August 5, in unusually choppy conditions. Faith, a Pit Bull, won the solo surfing event in the large dogs division, Cherie, a French Bulldog, in the medium dogs division, and Carson, a Terrier, and Delilah tied for first place for small dogs. Carson won Top Dog.

=== 2024 ===
After the organizers raised $12,000 through crowdfunding to address financial challenges in hosting the event, the 2024 event was held on August 3. In unusually rough conditions, the overall winner was Cacau, a chocolate Labrador Retriever from Brazil. Estimated attendance was over 6,000.

=== 2025 ===
The 2025 event required another crowdfunding campaign to pay city fees. It took place on August 2, in chilly, foggy conditions. Cacau was grand champion for the second year running; Faith, 14 years old and retiring this year, won the large dogs division; Iza, a French Bulldog, won the medium dogs division.

=== 2026 ===
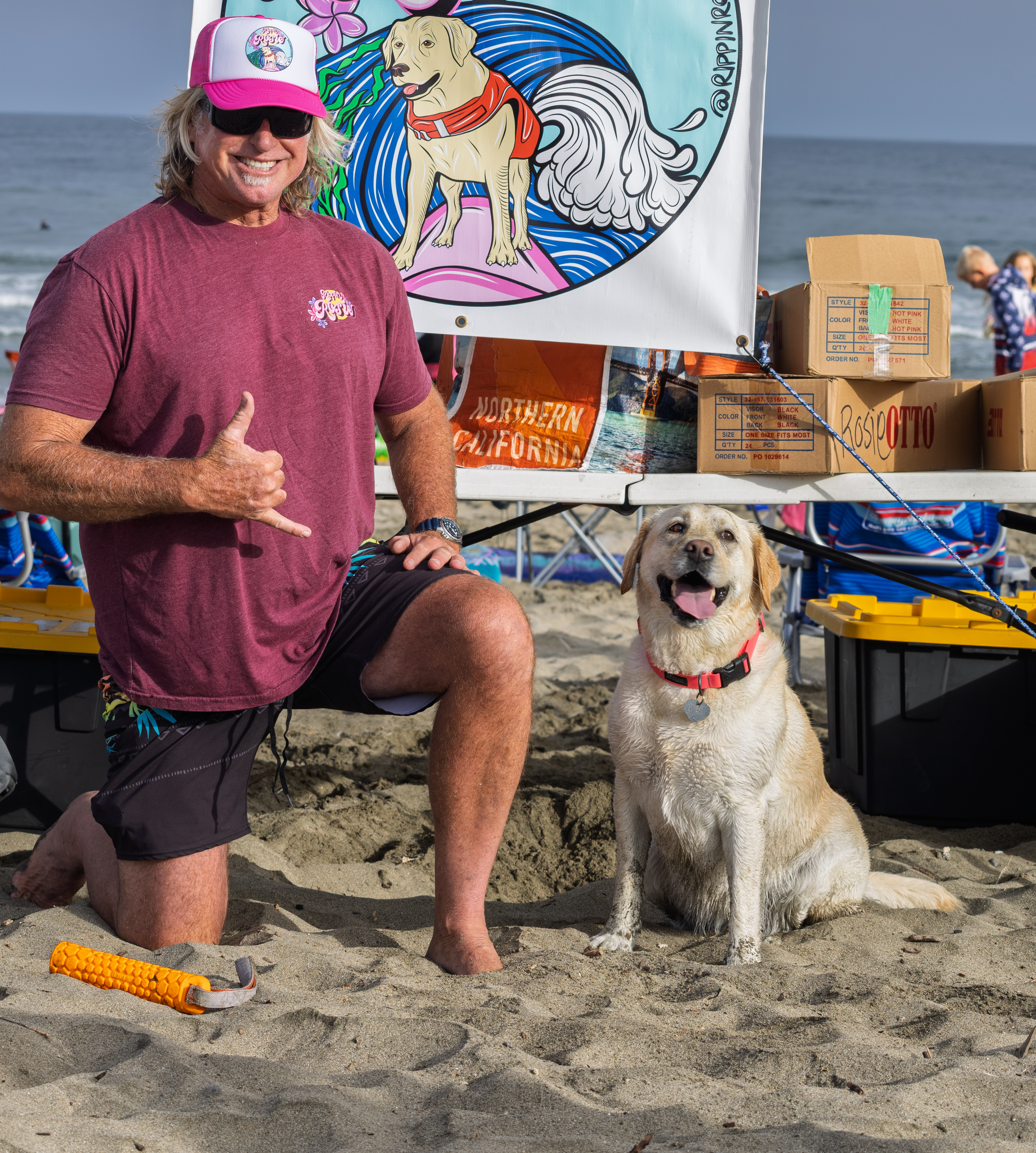
"Rippin" Rosie, 2026 Spirit of Surfing winner, and her human

The tenth World Dog Surfing Championships took place on August 1, 2026 with more than 20 contestants. Because of heavy surf, the "top dog" award was replaced with a "spirit of surfing" award, won by Rosie, a Labrador from Soquel who placed first in the large/extra-large category.
