= Middle Fork (San Pedro Creek) =

Stream in San Mateo County, California, U.S.

Coordinates: 37.57966°N 122.473031°W

Middle Fork is a stream in San Mateo County, California. It is a tributary of San Pedro Creek.

== See also ==
- List of watercourses in the San Francisco Bay Area
