= Frontierland Park =

Public park in Pacifica, California, United States

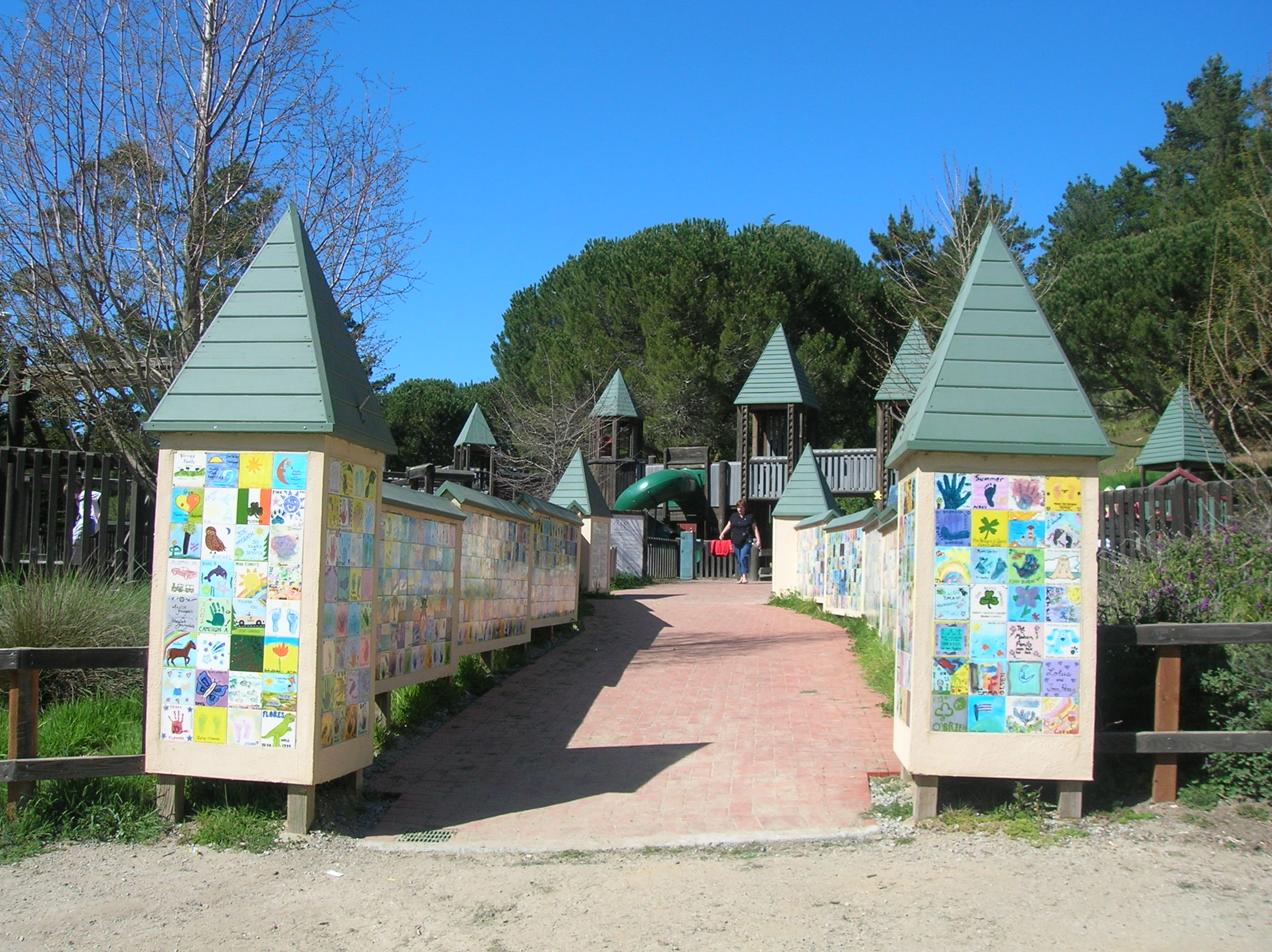
- Friendship Playground at Frontierland Park
- Interactive map of Frontierland Park
- Location: Pacifica, California, United States
- Coordinates: 37°35′12.8″N 122°27′50.2″W
- Operator: City of Pacifica Parks, Beaches, & Recreation Department
- Open: 6 AM–10 PM
- Status: open
- Designation: public

Frontierland Park is a park in Pacifica, California in the San Francisco Bay Area. The park was built on a former-landfill and was named after a nearby closed theme park.

== Frontierland Amusement Park ==
In the 1920s, 600 acres of the San Pedro Valley in present-day Pacifica were acquired by the wealthy Bernardi family of San Francisco through a syndicate arrangement. In 1960, a portion of the valley was opened as Frontierland Park, a western-themed amusement park, which sought to capture an Old West atmosphere. The park included a man-made lake, camping zones, equestrian facilities, a roping arena, a square dancing platform, and a frontier-style hotel with chuck wagon amenities. Frontierland provided activities like hayrides and stagecoach rides. At the time, the park was promoted as a "Disneyland-type asset to the Coastside" and attracted up to a thousand visitors on weekends.

== Present Day ==
The present-day Frontierland Park was built near the former amusement park, on the site of a former landfill. In 2001, the City of Pacifica built the Friendship Playground.

In September 2020, Pacifica added a new fitness court at Frontierland Park. Pacifica was selected as one of the 200 awardees to receive a $30,000 national grant from the National Fitness Campaign and $100,000 in local funding from the Roy Davies Trust. In 2022, the City Council granted unanimous approval for a bike park project in lower Frontierland Park. The estimated cost of the project ranged from $750,000 to $1,550,000.

== See also ==
- San Pedro Valley County Park
