= San Pedro Valley County Park =

Public park in Pacifica, California, United States

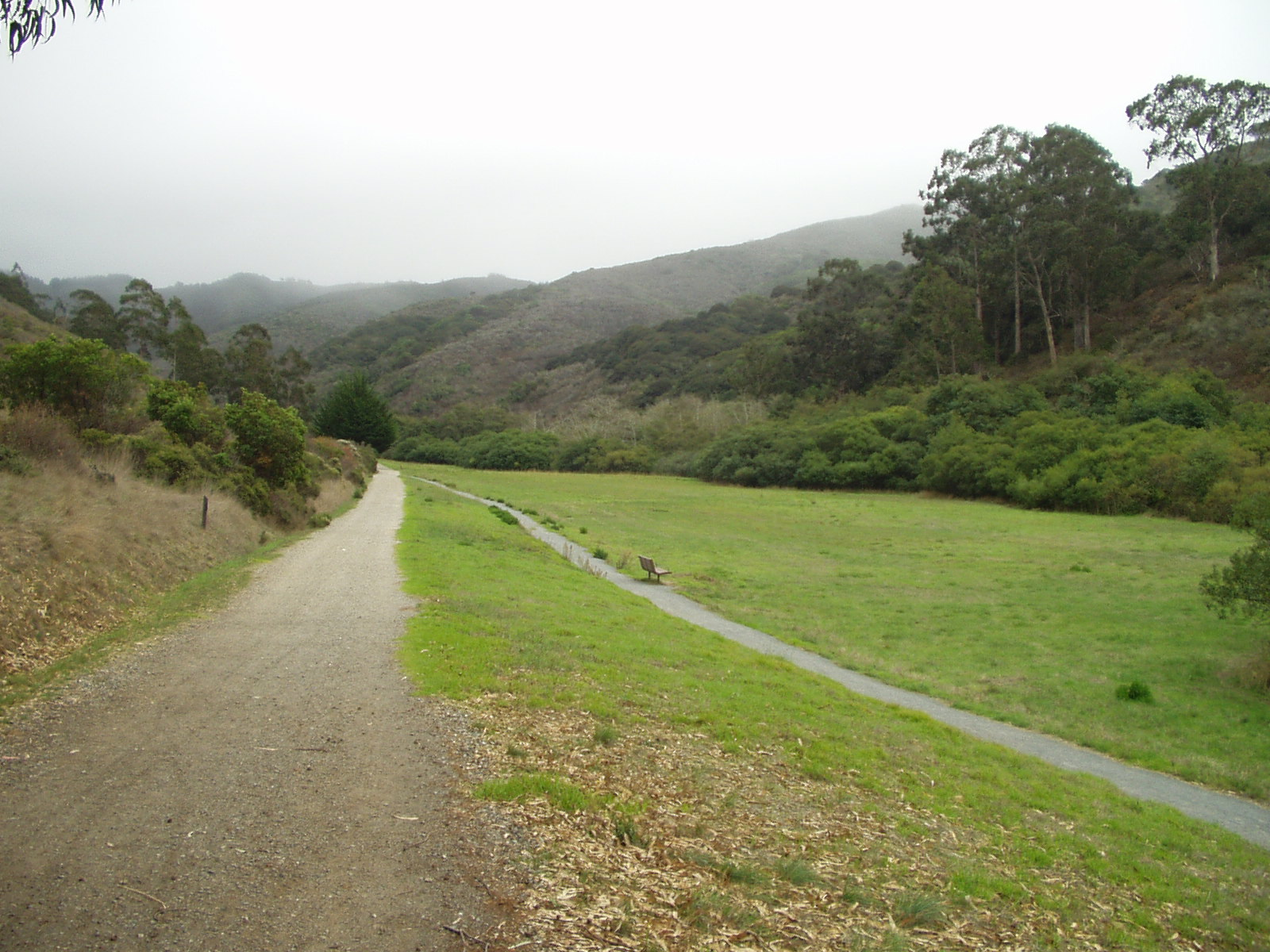
- Interactive map of San Pedro Valley County Park
- Type: Park
- Location: Pacifica, California, United States
- Coordinates: 37°34′26″N 122°28′15″W
- Area: 1,052 acres (4.26 km^{2})
- Owner: San Mateo County
- Website: parks.smcgov.org/san-pedro-valley-park

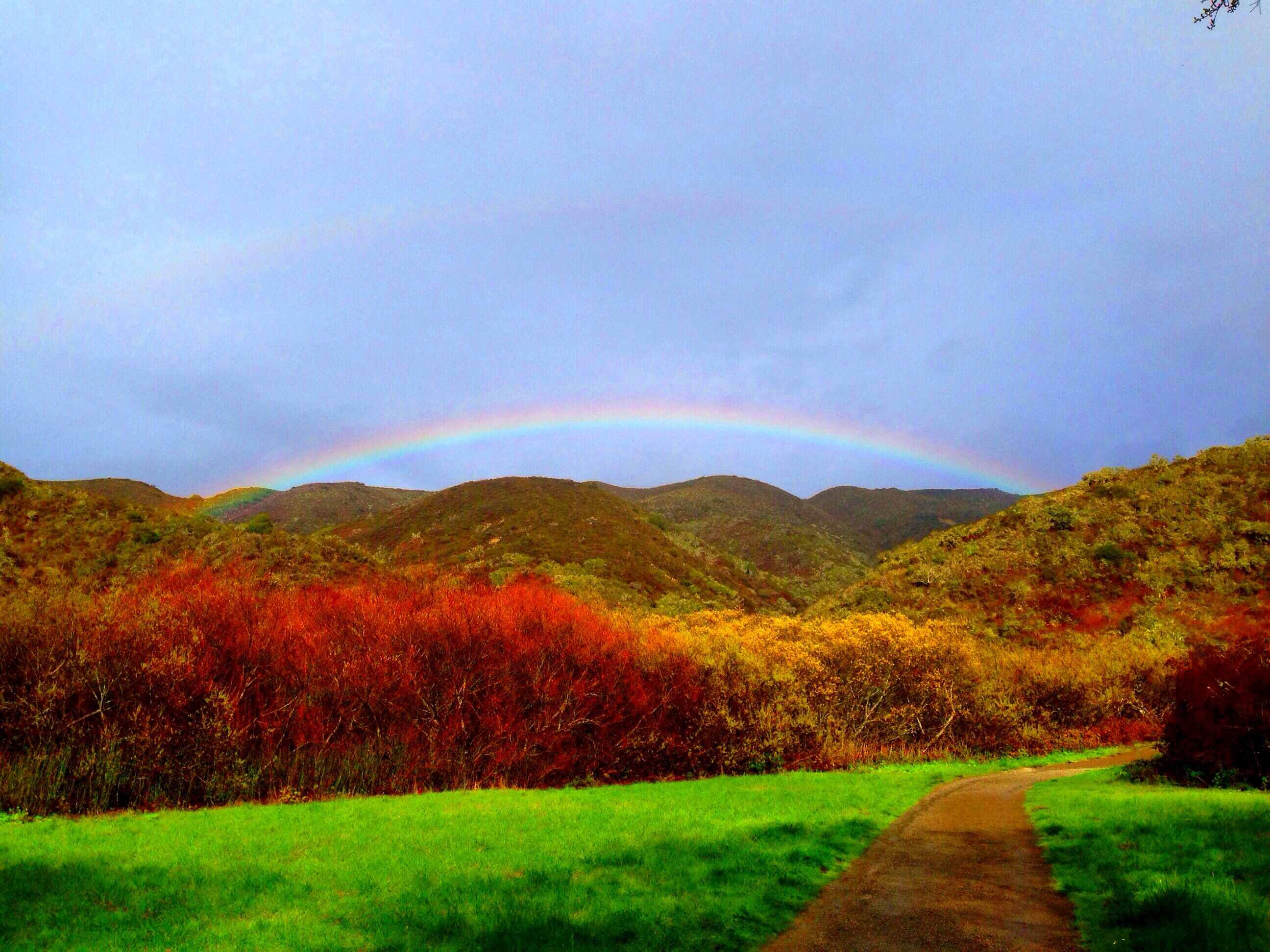
Rainbow in San Pedro Valley Park.

San Pedro Valley County Park is a San Mateo County park located in Pacifica, California, which includes the headwaters of San Pedro Creek.

== Location ==
San Pedro Valley Park is a public park based in Pacifica, California in San Mateo County. The park is located in the Southwest area of the city and nestled within the neighborhoods of Linda Mar, and Park Pacifica (known locally as Back of the Valley). The park itself embraces the middle and south forks of San Pedro Creek, which are Steelhead spawning grounds, as well as being park situated amongst the Santa Cruz Mountain range and the foothills of Pacifica.

== Activities ==
The park offers group picnic areas, family picnic sites with barbecue pits, a self-guiding nature trail, hiking trails, a visitor center, and views of a seasonal water fall. Horseback riding, dog walking, and hiking are common activities enjoyed daily by visitors. Along the Weiler Ranch Road Trail, there is a small bridge that spans the creek and a dead end cul de sac with several benches, from this area visitors can often view the Quail in their natural habitat as well as California's famous state flower, the California Poppy.

== Trails ==
- Montara Mountain Trail, 2.1 miles, includes views of the Pacific Ocean.
- The Brooks Creek Trail, 1.0 mile, to Brooks Falls which is 175 feet tall in three tiers following rain storms during the winter and spring.
- Hazelnut Trail, 3.7 miles
- Valley View Trail, 1.4 miles
- Weiler Ranch Road Trail, 1 mile known for wildlife viewing in the mornings and evenings.
- Plaskon Nature Trail, 0.1 mile, wheelchair accessible.
- Old Trout Farm Trail, .5 mile.

== See also ==
- Frontierland Park
