= North Fork (San Pedro Creek) =

River in California, United States

Coordinates: 37.57966°N 122.473309°W

North Fork is the largest tributary of San Pedro Creek in Pacifica, San Mateo County, California in the San Francisco Bay Area. North fork enters San Pedro Creek from the northeast less than 0.5 mile downstream from the junction of South Fork and Middle Fork.

== See also ==
- List of watercourses in the San Francisco Bay Area
