= Pacifica Skatepark =

Skatepark in Pacifica in the San Francisco Bay Area

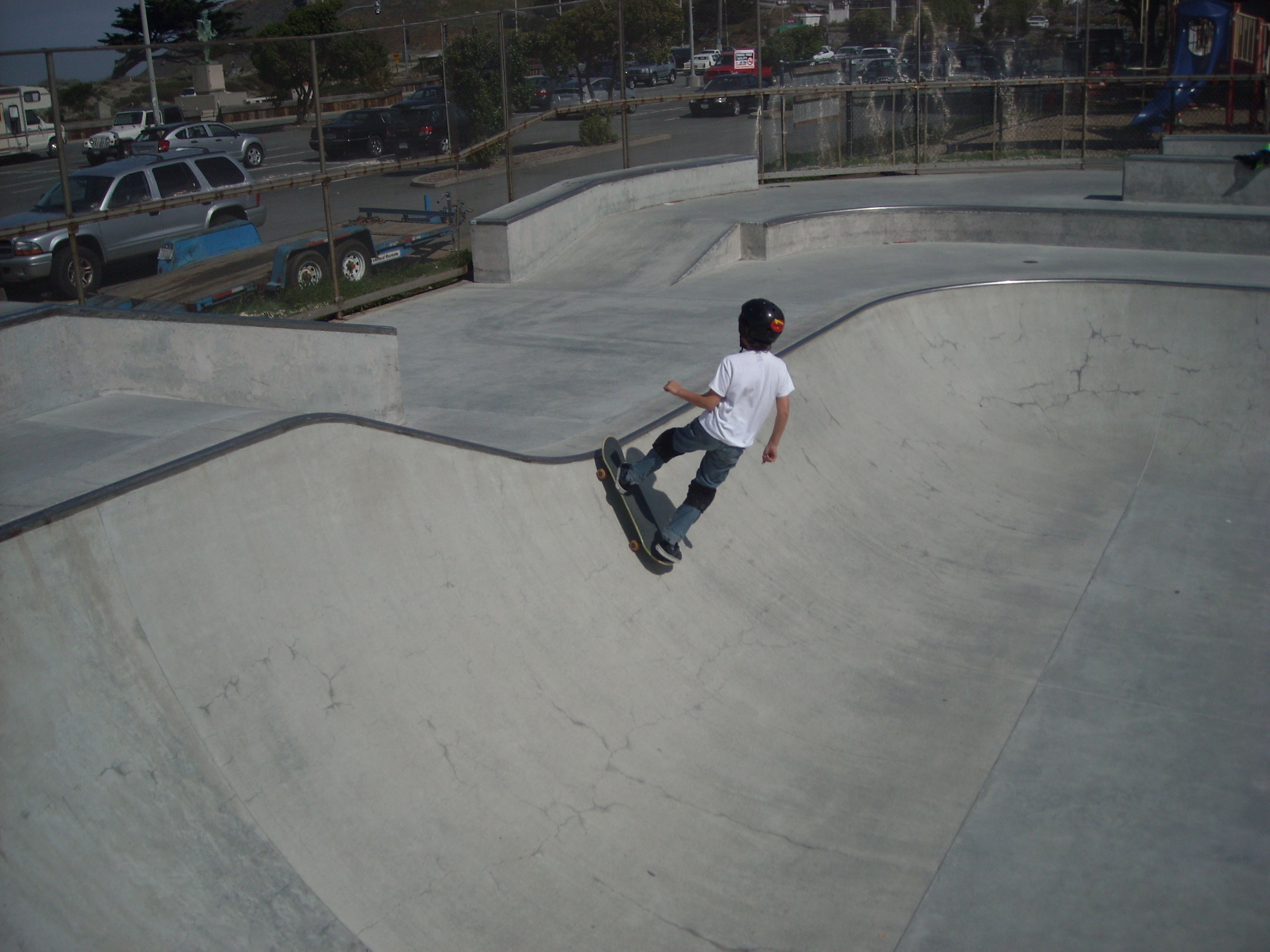
- Skater in Pacifica Skatepark, 2009
- Interactive map of Pacifica Skatepark
- Type: Skatepark
- Location: Pacifica, California
- Coordinates: 37°35′55.55″N 122°30′0.43″W
- Opened: December 5, 2005; 20 years ago
- Operator: City of Pacifica Parks, Beaches, & Recreation Department
- Open: 9am - 10pm
- Status: public
- Terrain: Concrete

The Pacifica Skatepark is a skatepark in Pacifica in the San Francisco Bay Area. It opened to the public in 2005, after skateboarder Tony Hawk was consulted during the park's design and construction. It is a concrete park over 14,000 sq ft (1,300 m^{2}) with a large pool, three bowls, and rails. The park is located directly adjacent to Pacifica State Beach.

== History ==
The concept of a skatepark in Pacifica began in September 1998, when a group of skaters and supporters collected 700 signatures and formed a Skate Park Committee led by Jim Crotty and Leo Gomez. Paul Marsili, one of the original supporters of the park, noted the park's original intention was to create a space for kids to hang out without being harassed by police, stating, "It’s good to have a legal place to ride. Skateboarding isn’t a crime."

The Pacifica Parks, Beaches and Recreation Commission approved the concept and the Pacifica City Council approved the site next to the Community Center. Funds for the skatepark came through fundraising, including skate expos, benefit concerts, and local business raffles. The park opened to the public in 2005.

In 2023, a viral video showed a man attacking a group of teenagers for bringing banned e-scooters into the park.

== Events ==
Numerous events and competitions have been held at the Pacifica Skatepark since its opening. Between 2005 and 2010, the park hosted three California Amateur Skate League contests and five Summer Series contests. In 2011, the park hosted a Skate Like a Girl event. In 2023, free skateboard lessons were provided for Go Skate Day.
