= San Pedro Creek =

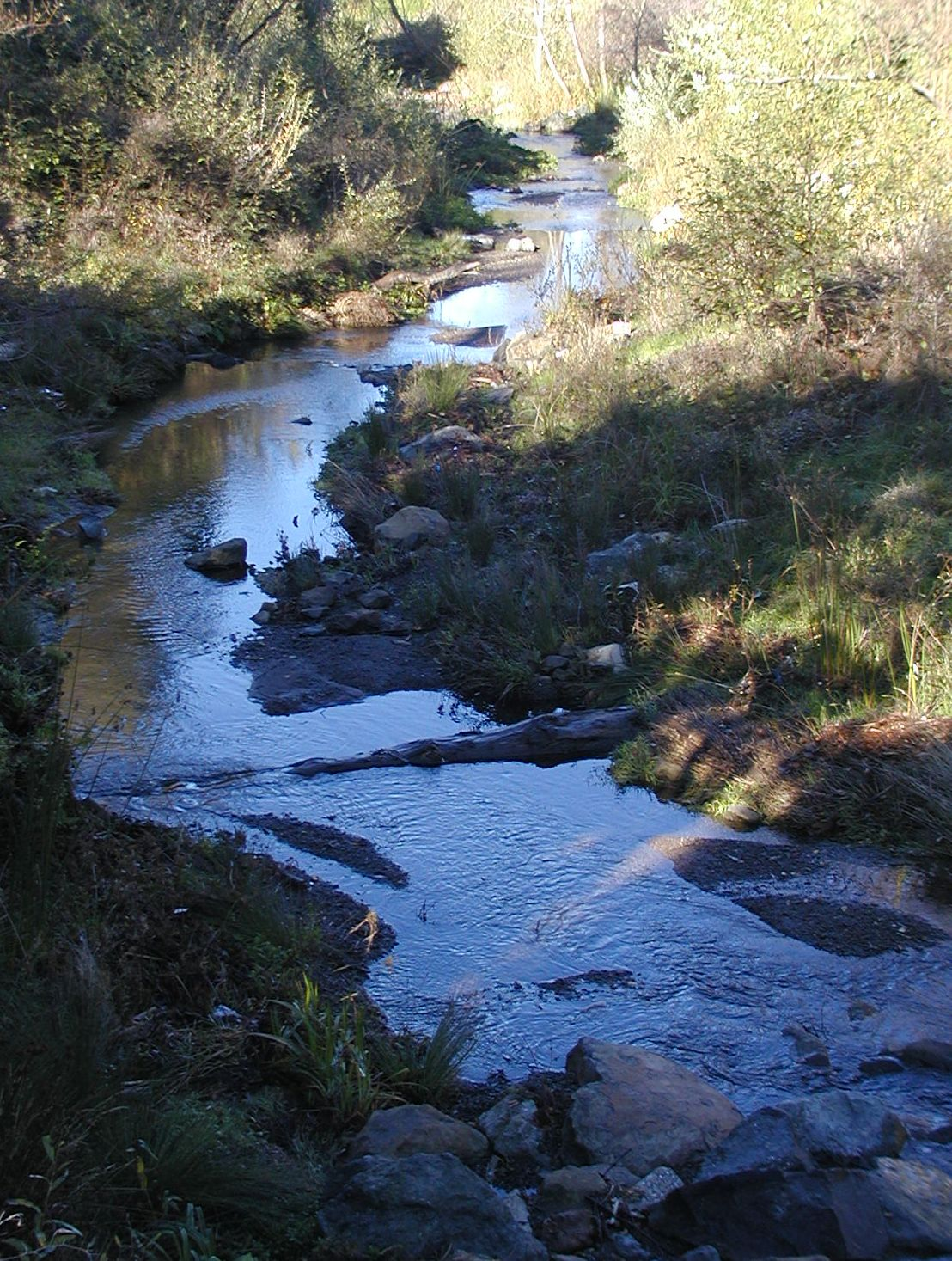
- San Pedro Creek, photo of segment of the Capistrano Fish Passage stream bed restoration project

Location
- Country: United States
- State: California
- Region: San Mateo County

Physical characteristics
- 2nd source: Confluence of Mid Fork and South Fork
  - coordinates: 37°34′47″N 122°28′23″W
  - elevation: 140 ft (43 m)
- Mouth: Pacific Ocean
  - location: Pacifica, California, San Mateo County, United States
  - coordinates: 37°35′47″N 122°30′21″W
  - elevation: 26 ft (7.9 m)

Basin features
- Tributaries
  - left: Brooks Creek
  - right: North Fork

San Pedro Creek (Spanish for St. Peter) is a perennial stream in the City of Pacifica, San Mateo County, California, in the San Francisco Bay Area whose tributaries originate on Sweeney Ridge in the Golden Gate National Recreation Area and Montara Mountain in the Santa Cruz Mountains.The creek mainstem flows 2.5 miles (4.0 km) through the San Pedro Valley to its mouth near Shelter Cove of the Pacific Ocean The stream is notable as the 1769 campsite for Gaspar de Portolà before he ascended Sweeney Ridge and discovered San Francisco Bay.

The south fork of San Pedro Creek became a trout farm, operated by John Gay, until 1962, when storm rains washed out the entire operation. The south fork is a seasonal water source for the City of Pacifica.

== San Pedro Creek Watershed ==
The river has eight sources and three major tributaries, the Mid Fork, North Fork and South Fork. Draining a watershed of 8.2 square miles (21 km^{2}), the lower portions of the stream were modified according to the local land uses, initially agriculture, and in the 1950s, suburban development. This involved straightening of the stream and elimination of wetlands and the reclamation of the former Lake Mathilde at the lower western zone with landfill. These changes, coupled with an increase of impermeable surface in the watershed has caused an increase in peak runoff levels, flooding and erosion of deeply incised channels up to 16 feet (4.9 m) deep. Most of the upper watershed is protected by San Pedro Valley County Park a 1,150-acre (4.7 km^{2}) park which has three perennial creeks, the south and middle forks of San Pedro Creek, and Brooks Creek. During the rainy, winter months, a special attraction is the beautiful Brooks Falls, which has a drop of 175 feet (53 m) in three tiers.

== Ecology ==
Fog drip provides up to one-third of the annual available moisture in the San Pedro Valley ecosystem, helping maintain year-round flow in the forks of San Pedro Creek.

Montara Mountain and Sweeney Ridge are not cloaked in the dense Coast Redwood (Sequoia sempervirens) and Coast Douglas-fir (Pseudotsuga menziesii var. menziesii) typical of the rest of the Santa Cruz Mountains to the immediate south. The early Spanish settlers described the ridges of the headwaters as without tall trees. The only tall trees were planted recently and include eucalyptus, Monterey pine and Monterey cypress. The area from Montara Mountain north to the Golden Gate represent a unique bio-geographic unit dubbed the "Franciscan Landscape" which is primarily Coastal Scrub dominated by Coyote Brush and also sheltering unique endemic species found nowhere else. The Hazelnut Trail in San Pedro Valley County Park is a good place to see these unusual species which include Giant Golden Chinquapin, Montara manzanita, fetid adders-tongue, and California hazelnut. These and other plants such as Wake robins, Coast and Giant trillium, and slender false Solomon's seal blossom between clustered stems of shrubs and clumps of sword fern. Fetid adder's tongue—with its mottled green leaves, brown-purple striped flowers, and odor of rotting flesh—is particularly abundant. The fact that these species normally grow in the shady understory of redwood and Douglas fir forests, has led to speculation that prior to the 5,000 year occupation of the Ohlone Indians, who likely burned off the area to promote the growth of natural food sources, that the upper San Pedro watershed may have been host to primordial conifer forests.

Creek Dogwood, Arroyo Willow, Watercress, and several species of ferns are common in the middle and lower creeks. In the springtime, the meadows of the Middle Valley show off an array of wildflowers: California Poppies, Suncups, Buttercups, Wild Radish and Wild Mustard. Wildlife is abundant at San Pedro Valley. Park inhabitants often seen include red-tailed hawks, turkey vultures, California quail, California scrub jays, and garter snakes. Those observed less frequently include deer, bobcats, grey foxes, raccoons, rabbits and gopher snakes. The three forks of the San Pedro and its Brooks Creek tributary provide critical spawning areas for steelhead trout (Oncorhyncus mykiss). The steelhead spawning season is normally from December to February. San Pedro Creek is also the habitat of the endangered Northern tidewater goby.

== Pollution ==
In 1999, a group Pacifica residents formed the nonprofit San Pedro Creek Watershed Coalition, with the goal of protecting and enhancing the health of the San Pedro Creek and watershed. Their activities include monitoring, restoration, adaptive management, and education programs. The monitoring program has joined with a monitoring program of the Environmental Protection Agency, started in 1998, to track and identify sources of pollution in the creek. A year 2000 comprehensive study, in cooperation with the San Francisco State University Masters program reviewed the in-stream chemical, physical and biological qualities of the creek. A key finding of the study was that fecal bacteria levels in the North Fork and Main Stem of San Pedro Creek significantly exceeded the acceptable levels of exposure for recreation per the State of California and the EPA. The recreation use level is pertinent due to beach closures for recreational uses, including surfing, near the creek's mouth on the Pacific Ocean.

The highest pollution levels were found during the wet season and were located at downstream sites during the highest during runoff events. The dominated pollution was E. coli traced to avian sources, but also significant association with dogs, human, horse, raccoon and deer. During the dry season the ratio of sources still was primarily avian, but raccoons and dogs become more dominant.

== Restoration projects ==
In 2005, the City of Pacifica completed a Capistrano Fish Passage restoration of the 1,300 feet (400 m) of stream bed, including the restructuring of the Capistrano Bridge culvert. The improved culvert, in addition to a system of weirs and pools restored the ability of juvenile fish to travel upstream through this portion of the creek in 2005.

In light of the historical problem of flooding, with large damaging floods occurring in 1962, 1972, and 1982, the City of Pacifica completed a $5 million five-year reconstruction project for the lower segment of San Pedro Creek in May 2005. This San Pedro Creek Flood Control Project which, in conjunction with the renovation adjacent stretches of the Pacifica State Beach, won the top national award from the American Shore and Beach Preservation Association for the year 2005.

== See also ==
- List of watercourses in the San Francisco Bay Area
- Mid Fork, San Pedro Creek
- North Fork, San Pedro Creek
- South Fork, San Pedro Creek
