= Pacifica State Beach =

Ocean beach in California, United States

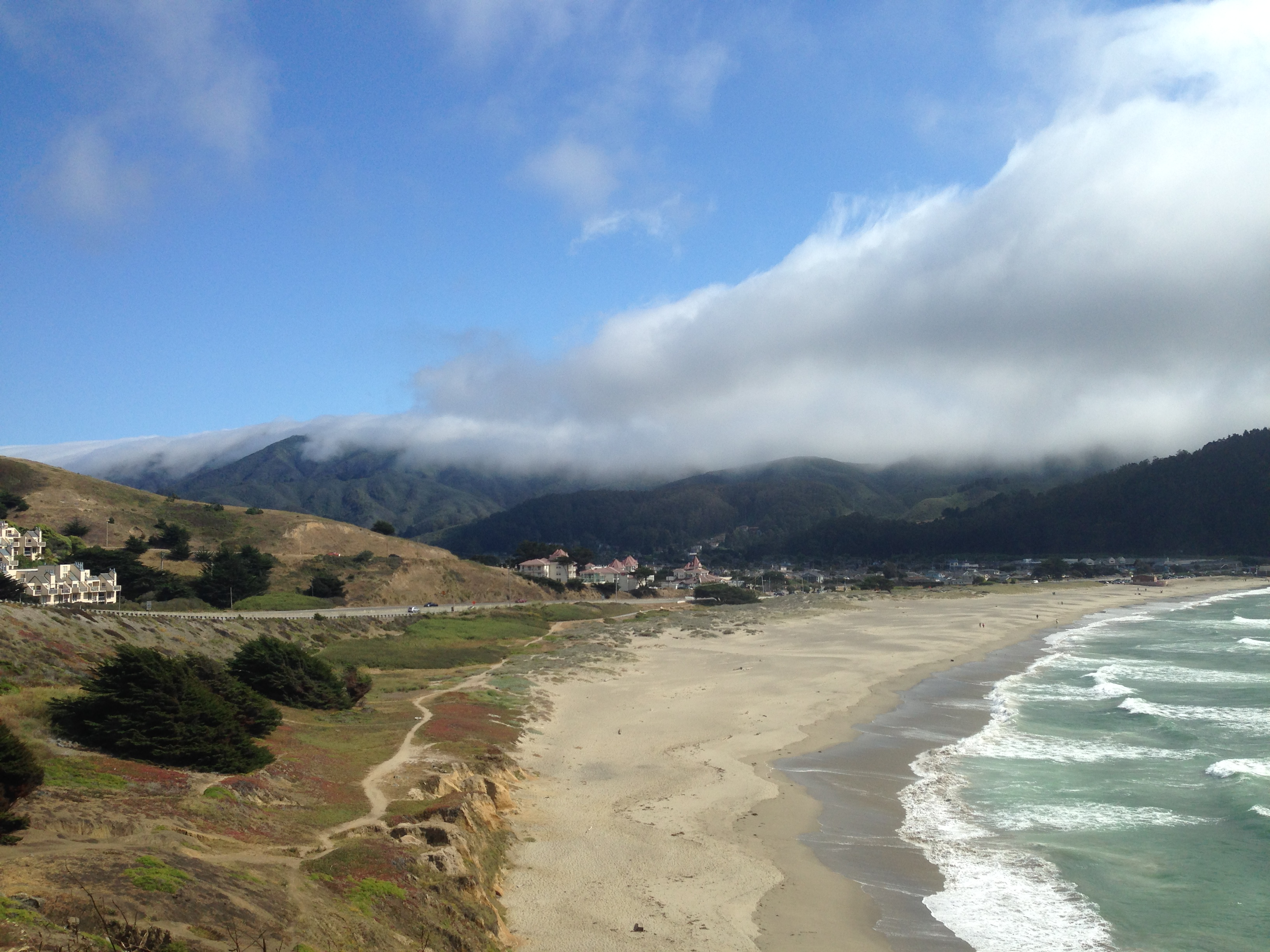

- Location within California Location within the United States
- Location: San Mateo County
- Nearest city: Pacifica, California
- Coordinates: 37°36′4″N 122°29′57″W
- Visitors: 1 million (annually)
- Governing body: California Department of Parks and Recreation

Pacifica State Beach is the southernmost of Pacifica, California's large beaches. It is a 0.75-mile-long (1.21 km) crescent-shaped beach located at the mouth of the San Pedro Valley in downtown Pacifica off State Route 1, in San Mateo County. Over one million people visit this beach annually.

Pacifica State Beach is one of the most popular beginner surfing spots in the San Francisco area. Among surfers it is commonly known as Linda Mar Beach because it fronts Pacifica's Linda Mar neighborhood. It is a State Beach managed by the City of Pacifica through an operating agreement with California State Parks. The Pacifica Skatepark is located directly across from the beach.

The beach is accessible via bus from Daly City station on SamTrans line 110.

== History ==
Between 1989 and 2005, Pacifica State Beach was the focus of an extensive beach habitat restoration program, in association with the San Pedro Creek flood control and habitat restoration. In 2002, as part of a partnership with the Pacifica Land Trust and the California Coastal Conservancy, this involved the $2.2 million purchase and removal of two oceanside homes and surrounding acreage for the purpose of beach and estuary restoration.

This project was identified as a Top Restored Beach by the American Shore and Beach Preservation Association in 2005, cited as "...an example of a well-planned, well-executed coastal project that is the product of cooperative efforts of the local community, state and federal agencies, scientists, engineers and citizens. The complex beach and habitat restoration project involved over 10 regulatory and permitting agencies, funding from eight granting agencies and the active participation of eight environmental groups. It is one of the first beaches to utilize managed retreat as a method of shoreline protection. In addition to beach nourishment, it has restored habitat for four threatened and endangered species and enhanced community access with expanded parking lots, trails and new restrooms.

The World Dog Surfing Championships have been held at Pacifica State Beach since 2016.

== Wildlife ==
Pacifica State Beach provides habitat for the western snowy plover, a shorebird which is designated as threatened under the Endangered Species Act.

== Taco Bell Cantina ==
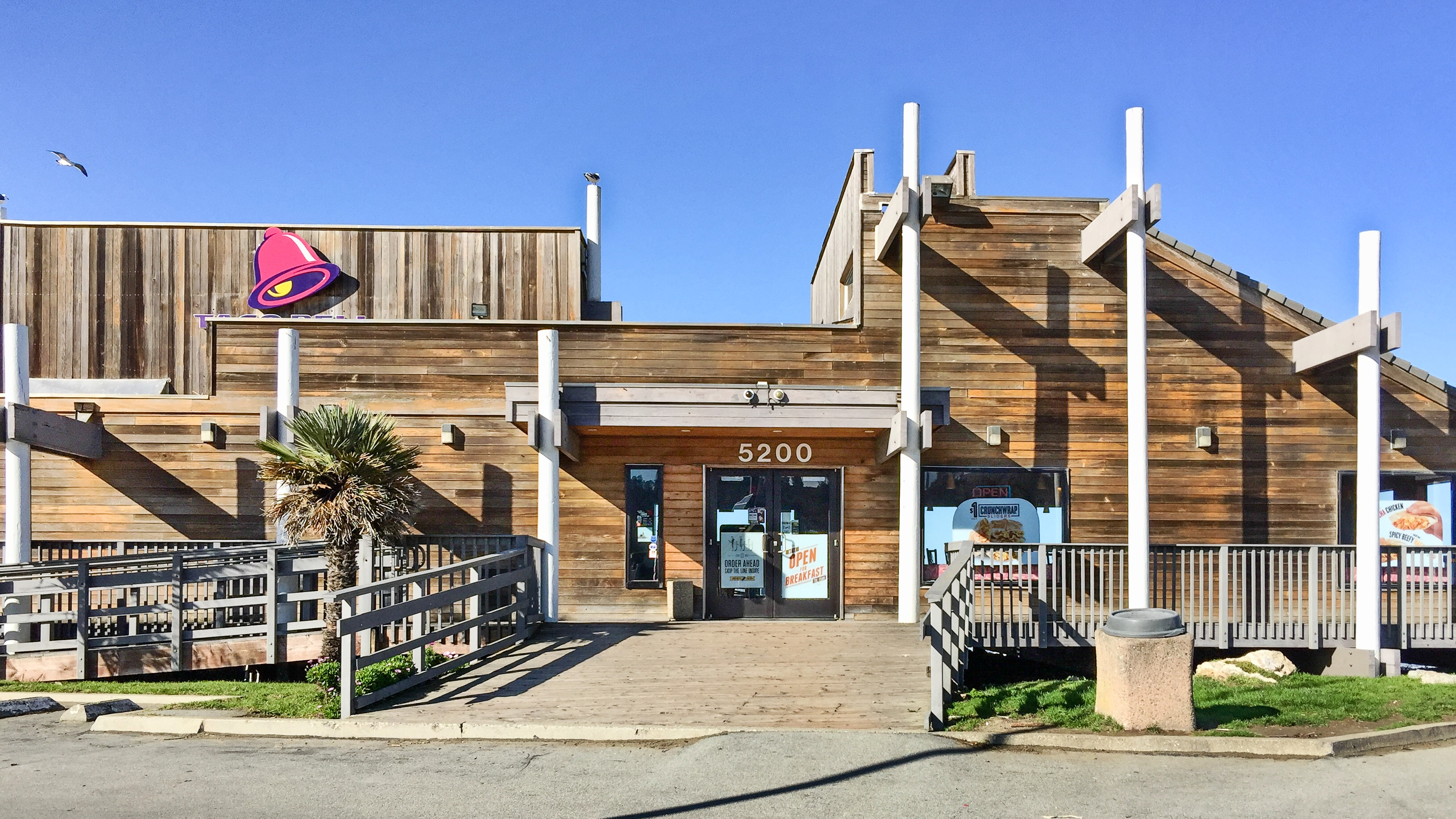
The popular Taco Bell.

The Taco Bell restaurant on the beach side of the highway is reputed to be the world's most scenic Taco Bell location. The structure was built in the late 1960s and originally operated as an A&W Restaurant. In 1972, California voters passed Proposition 20, which established the California Coastal Commission and barred buildings west of Highway 1; however, the Taco Bell was allowed to continue operations after being grandfathered in. The Pacifica Taco Bell first gained national recognition in the 1990s, when Condé Nast Traveler listed it as one of the world's most scenic fast food restaurants.

In 2019, the location underwent major renovations, including installing a fireplace and beginning to serve alcohol. In 2020, the location went viral on TikTok after the travel influencer Megan Homme posted a video that gained several million views.

A Los Angeles Times article addressing coastal erosion pointed out that the Taco Bell, which still boasts prime oceanfront views, could be seen as a sign that the climate-vulnerable Pacifica may be exceeding its intended lifespan.

== Gallery ==
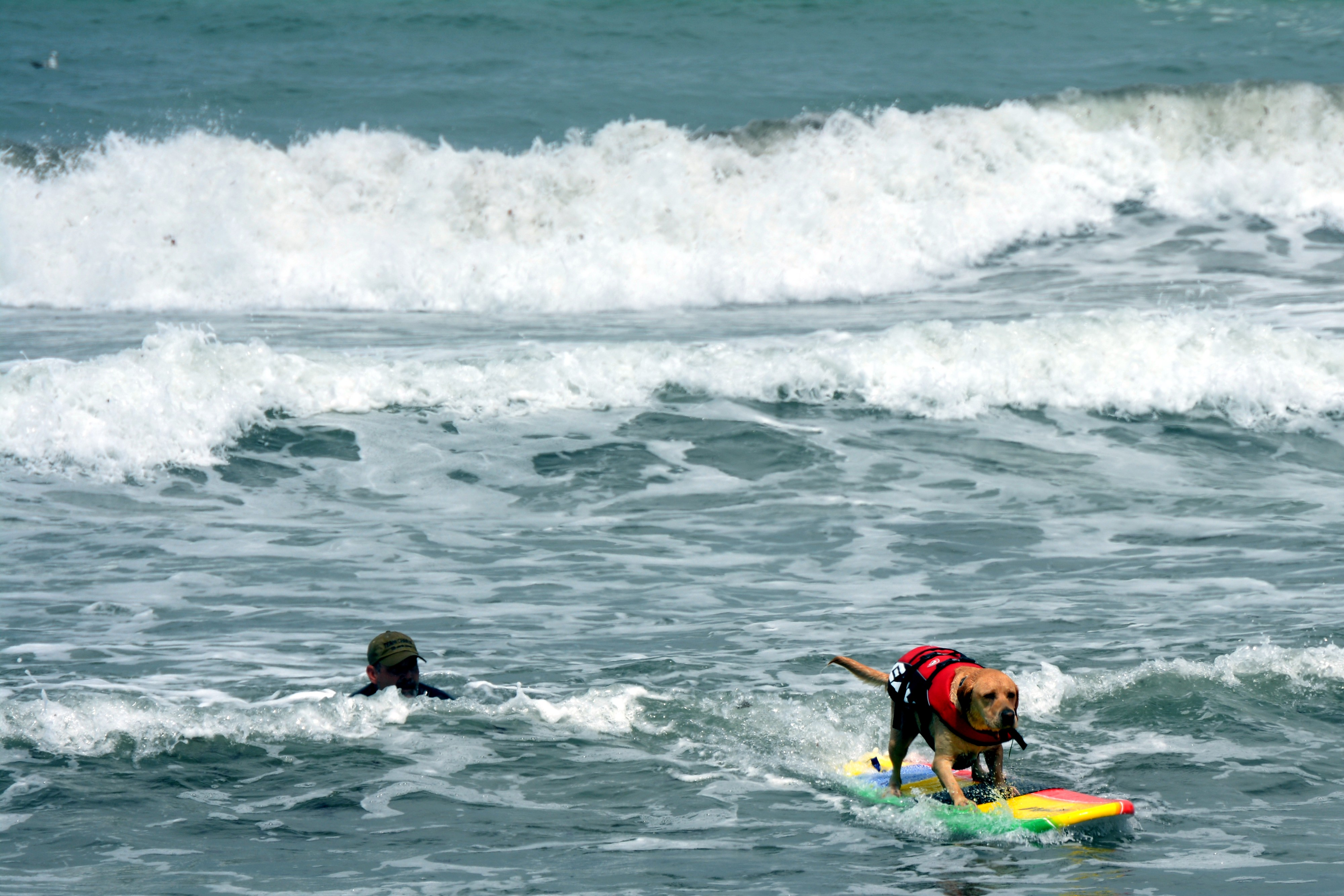
World Dog Surfing Championships

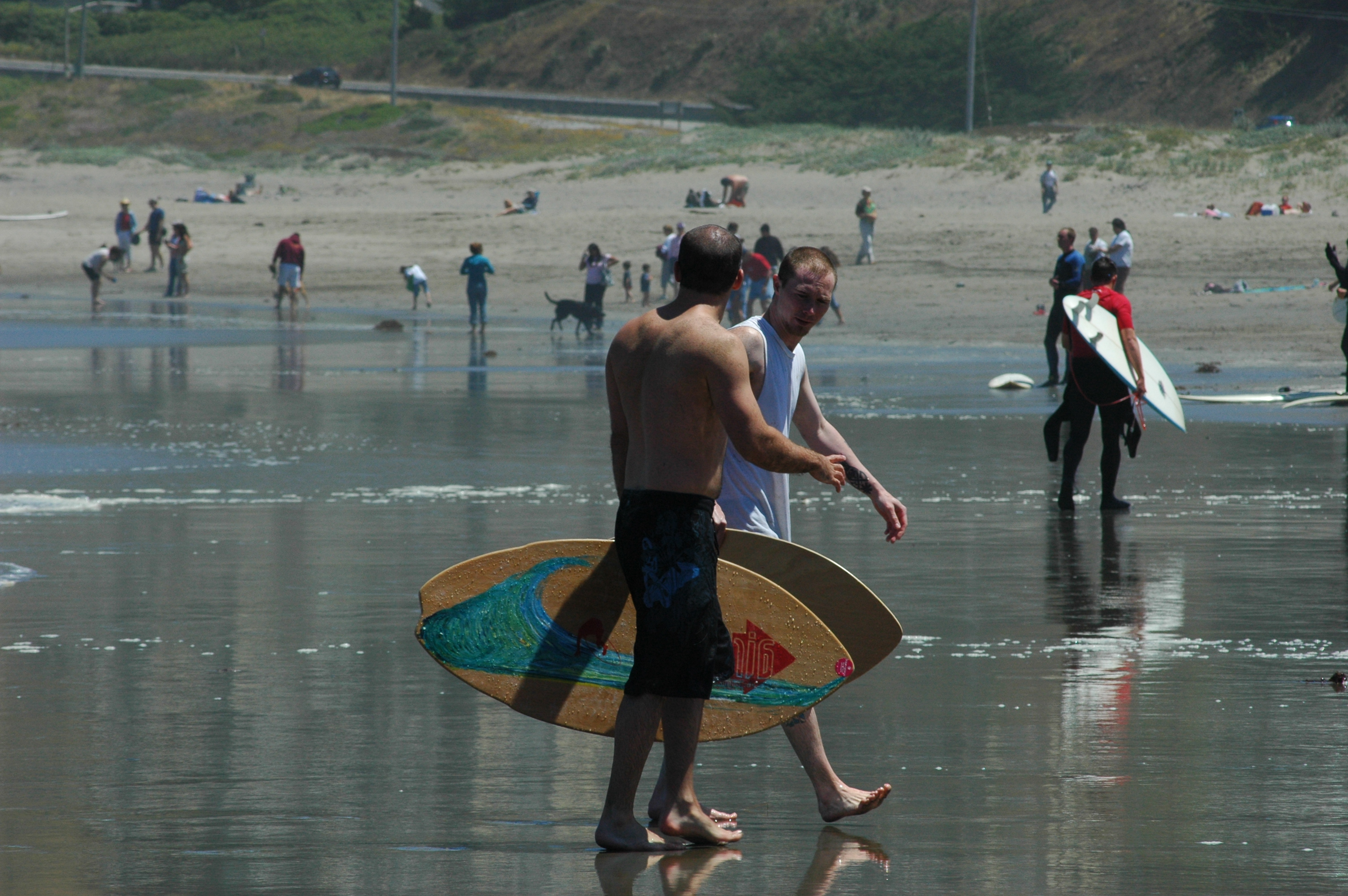
A skimboarder

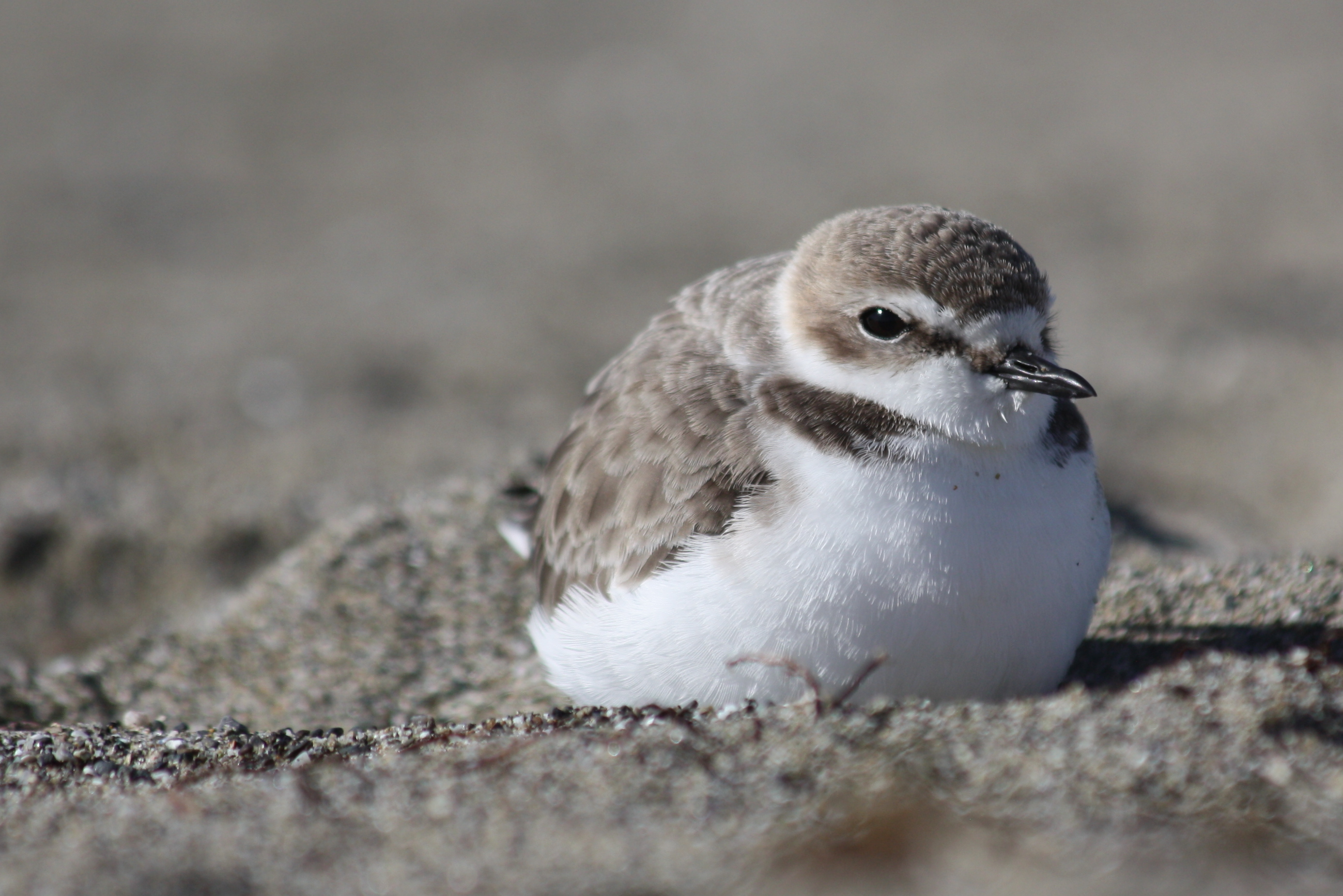
Snowy Plover

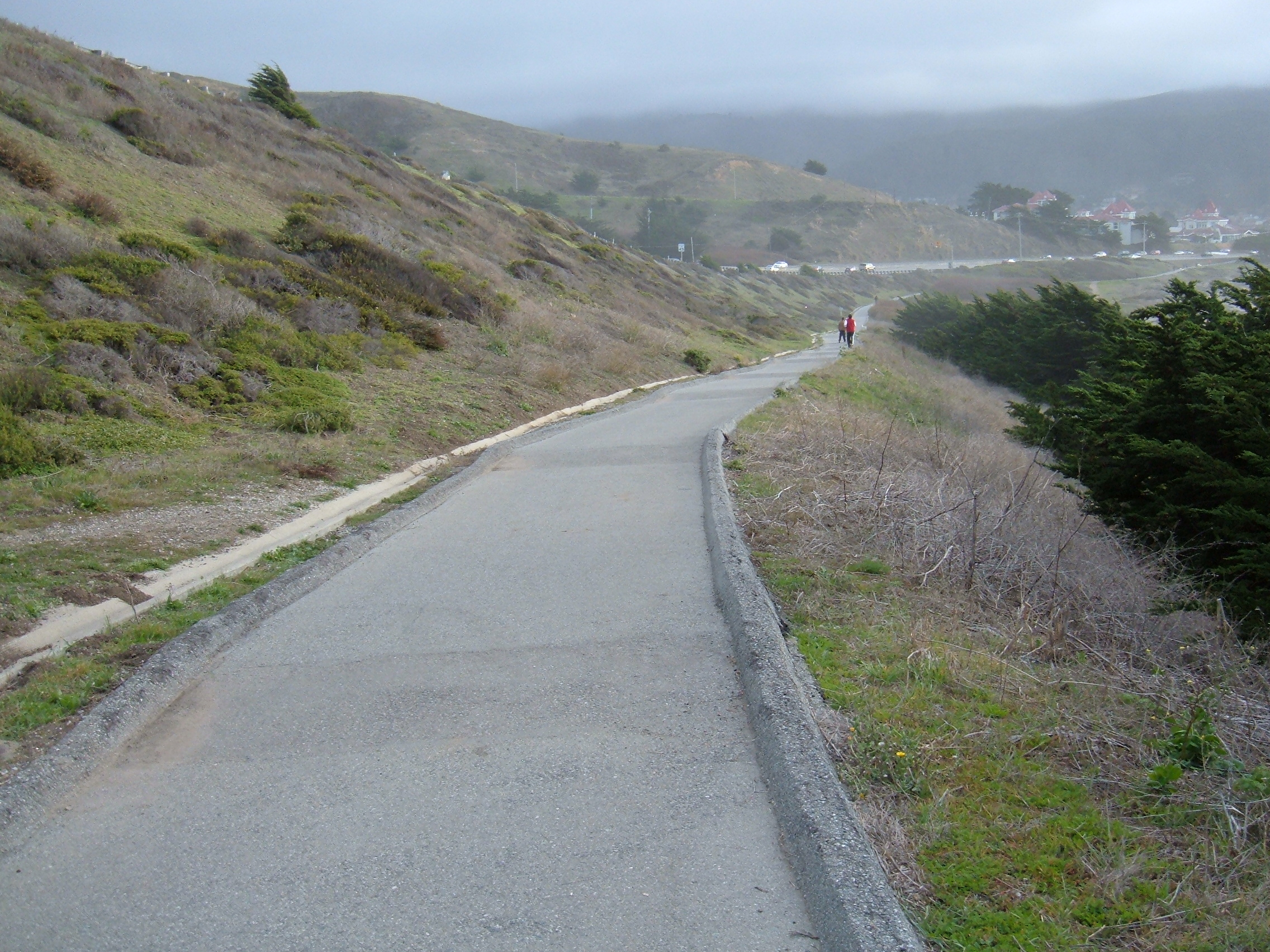
A trail behind and around Pacifica State Beach
