= Pier 26 (San Francisco) =

Historic pier in the US

Coordinates: 37°47′19.47″N 122°23′15.74″W

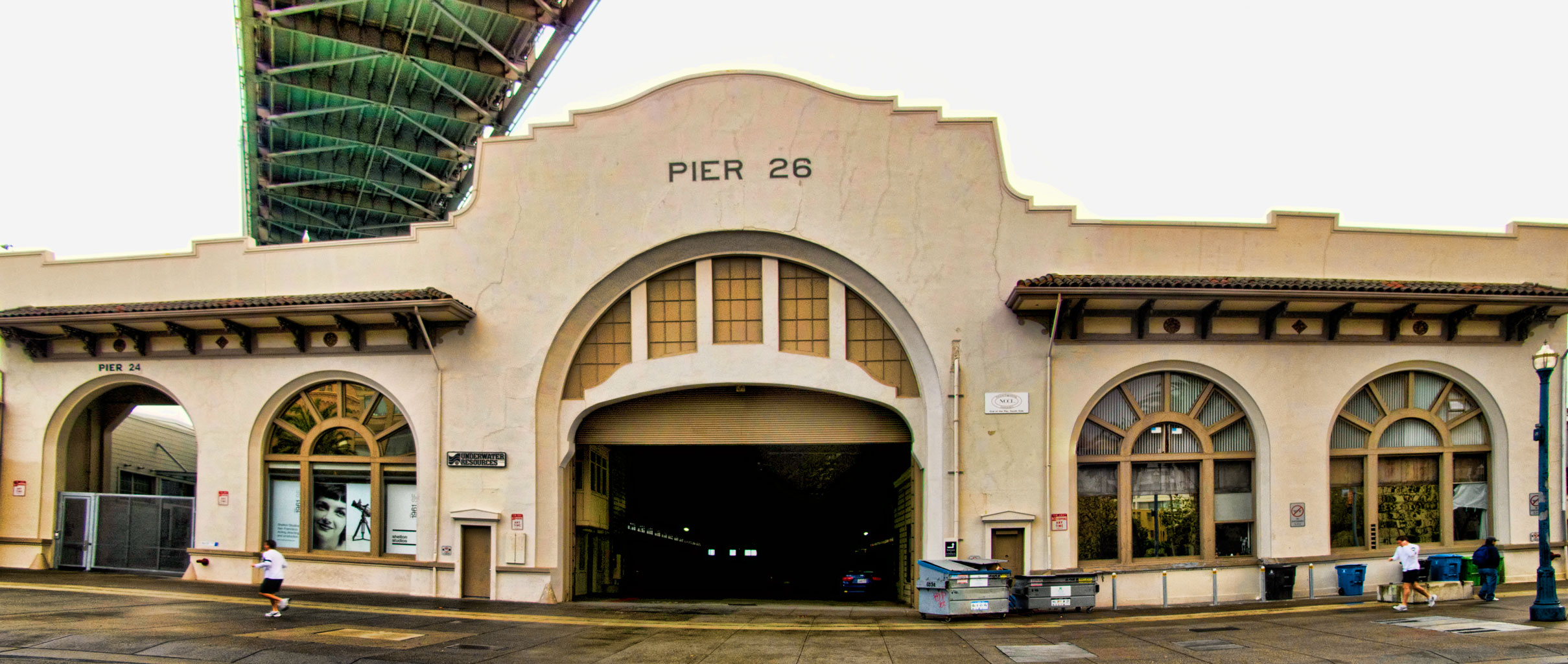
Pier 26 Facade, Port of San Francisco (2010)

The existing historic Pier 26 in San Francisco is located on the Embarcadero with its entrance directly under the San Francisco–Oakland Bay Bridge, several blocks southeast of the Ferry Building. The pier is a single story gable timber structure that rests partially on concrete retainage but mostly on pier foundations on the bay. Its surface area measures approximately 100,000 square feet (9,300 m^{2}), currently used for parking and storage. Its front facade along the Embarcadero is of historic significance. The United States Geological Survey treats the entrance of Pier 26 on the Embarcadero as the location of Rincon Point, though the Embarcadero is built on land fill and the historical location was slightly to the northwest.

== History ==
The current location of Pier 26 is near Rincon Point, which was the southern end of Yerba Buena Cove. By the middle of the 19th century, the cove and much of the rest of the San Francisco Waterfront was little more than a crumbling mass of abandoned ships and piers. Many of the people who traveled to California to find fame and fortune in the gold rush simply abandoned their boats on the waterfront. In 1863, The Board of State Harbor Commissioners commissioned a sea wall to extend around San Francisco's bay shore, which exists today as the Embarcadero.

Pier 26 was developed from existing piers and wharfs at its current location, along with the rest of the Port of San Francisco. After the fire and earthquake of 1906, the piers were modernized and the Port of San Francisco adopted its current system of numbered piers with odd numbered piers to the north of the Ferry Building, and even numbered piers to the south. Pier 26 was leased to the American-Hawaii Steamship Company until the Port fell into disuse in the 1950s. Today, all commercial shipping has moved across the bay to the Port of Oakland, and the pier is now used for parking and storage.

== 1934 Waterfront Strike ==
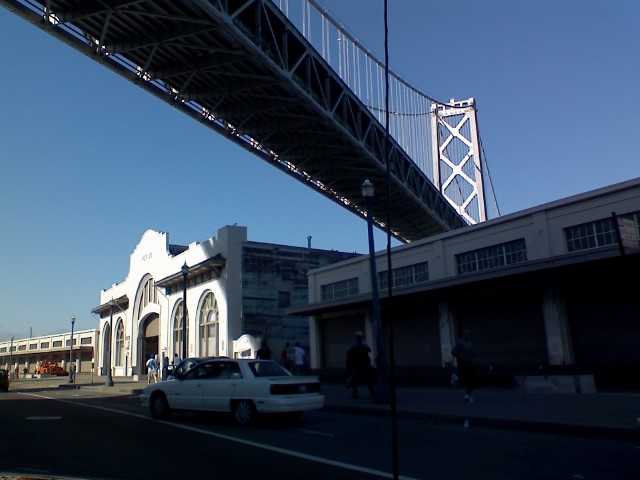
Pier 26 with the San Francisco–Oakland Bay Bridge overhead

During the 1934 West Coast Waterfront Strike the longshoreman's unions were organized at Pier 26. The Bloody Thursday riots of July 5, 1934 that killed two union workers occurred outside of Pier 26. Although the strike was perceived by many to be a failure, it helped secure a critical pay raise for the longshoremen during the darkest days of the Great Depression. It cemented the resolve of waterfront unions to protest abuse by their superiors. Each year, the International Longshore and Warehouse Union does not work on July 5 in memory of Bloody Thursday.

== World War II ==
The San Francisco waterfront piers played a crucial role in the Pacific theater during World War II. With the outbreak of the war, San Francisco's waterfront became a military logistics center; troops, equipment and supplies left the Port in support of the Pacific theater. Almost every pier and wharf was involved in military activities, with troop ships and naval vessels tied up all along the Embarcadero. In addition, the military briefly set up antiaircraft guns and searchlights at piers along the waterfront from 1941 to 1942.

== Shelton Studios ==
In 2006, Executive Director Matthew Shelton leased the historic building to launch film and theater projects. The Shelton Studios was founded by local legend Jean Shelton and Robert Elross, both very active in the Bay Area theater and film communities. Currently Jean Shelton's photo from 1947 graces the main window of Pier 26.

== See also ==
- 1934 West Coast waterfront strike
- Central Embarcadero Piers Historic District
- Port of Oakland
- Port of San Francisco
- Shelton Studios
