= The Infinity =

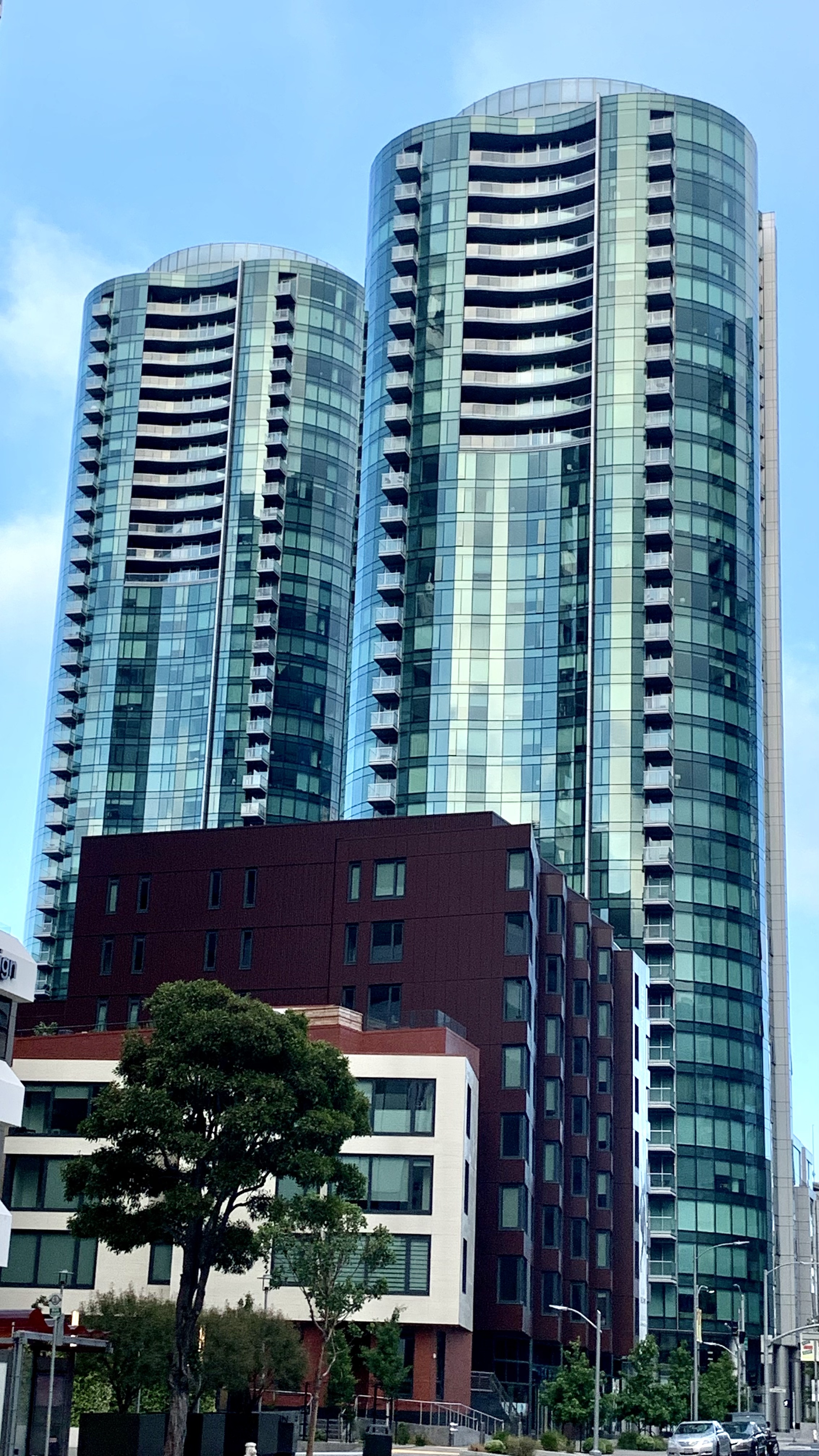
- In 2021

- Location within San Francisco The Infinity (California) The Infinity (the United States)

General information
- Status: Completed
- Type: Residential condominiums
- Architectural style: Modernism
- Location: 160 Folsom Street; San Francisco, California
- Coordinates: 37.7894°N 122.3910°W
- Construction started: 2005
- Completed: 2008
- Owner: Tishman Speyer Properties

Height
- Roof: Tower I: 106.7 m (350 ft); Tower II: 128.9 m (423 ft)

Technical details
- Floor count: Tower I: 37; Tower II: 41
- Floor area: 148,645 m^{2} (1,600,000 sq ft)
- Lifts/elevators: 14

Design and construction
- Architects: Heller Manus Architects; Arquitectonica
- Developer: Tishman Speyer Properties
- Structural engineer: Magnusson Klemencic Associates
- Services engineer: Cupertino Electric
- Main contractor: Webcor Builders

Other information
- Number of units: 650

The Infinity or 300 Spear Street is a mixed-use residential condominium development in the Rincon Hill neighborhood of San Francisco, California consisting of 2 high-rise towers and 2 low-rise buildings. The four buildings contain 650 residential units. The complex is the first phase of a massive residential development encompassing two city blocks.

== History ==
The two residential projects, 300 Spear and 201 Folsom, were proposed by Tishman Speyer Properties and initially designed by Heller Manus Architects. The San Francisco Planning Commission was scheduled to give its vote on the two projects on June 26, 2003, but this was delayed until September. Eventually, the two projects were given approval by the Planning Commission in spite of heavy opposition. However, 300 Spear and 201 Folsom still needed approval from the San Francisco Board of Supervisors in order for the project to progress. A few months later, the Board of Supervisors gave initial approval to the projects. The project was given final approval by San Francisco's Board of Supervisors on February 4, 2004.

== Description ==
=== Overview ===
The residential complex consists of four buildings with one 8 and one 9-story midrise, and 37 and 42-story highrise towers. The highrise towers are named The Infinity I and The Infinity II. One of the towers, the Infinity I, rises 350 ft (107 m) and contain 37 floors. The taller highrise, the Infinity II, rises 450 ft (137 m) ^{[A]} and contain 42 floors. The 650-unit complex containing these four buildings is bounded by Main Street to the southwest, Folsom Street to the northwest and Spear Street to the northeast. The complex is one block inland from the Embarcadero and the San Francisco Bay. Pricing for the units range from $700,000-$5 million.

=== Design ===
300 Spear was originally designed by San Francisco's Heller Manus Architects. The 820-unit complex featured a garden on top of the midrise towers and all four buildings were connected together. Later, the developer decided to hire Arquitectonica to revamp the design of 300 Spear along with Heller Manus Architects. The four buildings of the complex were split apart and the sky gardens were gone. In addition, the complex had its color changed to a blue-green color which adapted a simplified concrete structure with curving walls of glass curtain wall and metal. The number of units was also reduced from 820 to 650 before construction of 300 Spear began.

=== Impact ===
The highrise towers rise above the earlier buildings in between the Embarcadero waterfront and Spear Street, making the complex prominent from places like the San Francisco Bay. Along with the Millennium Tower and One Rincon Hill to the west and south, respectively, they will create a new highrise neighborhood in the South of Market district.

=== Buried ship discovery ===
Construction started in April, 2005 when a surface parking lot was demolished to make way for the complex. Midway through the excavation process, a buried 125 ft (38 m) ship was found just to the south of Spear Street 20 ft (6.1 m) below street level on fill that was once a ship breaking dock owned by Charles Haer. The buried ship was later identified as the 1818 whaling ship The Candace.

== Notes ==
A. ^{a} ^{b} The SkyscraperPage.com 300 Spear and San Francisco Project Rundown threads state The Infinity I is 400 feet (122 m) tall, as opposed to 450 feet (137 m). Source. Source.

== See also ==
- List of tallest buildings in San Francisco
