= Solaire (San Francisco) =

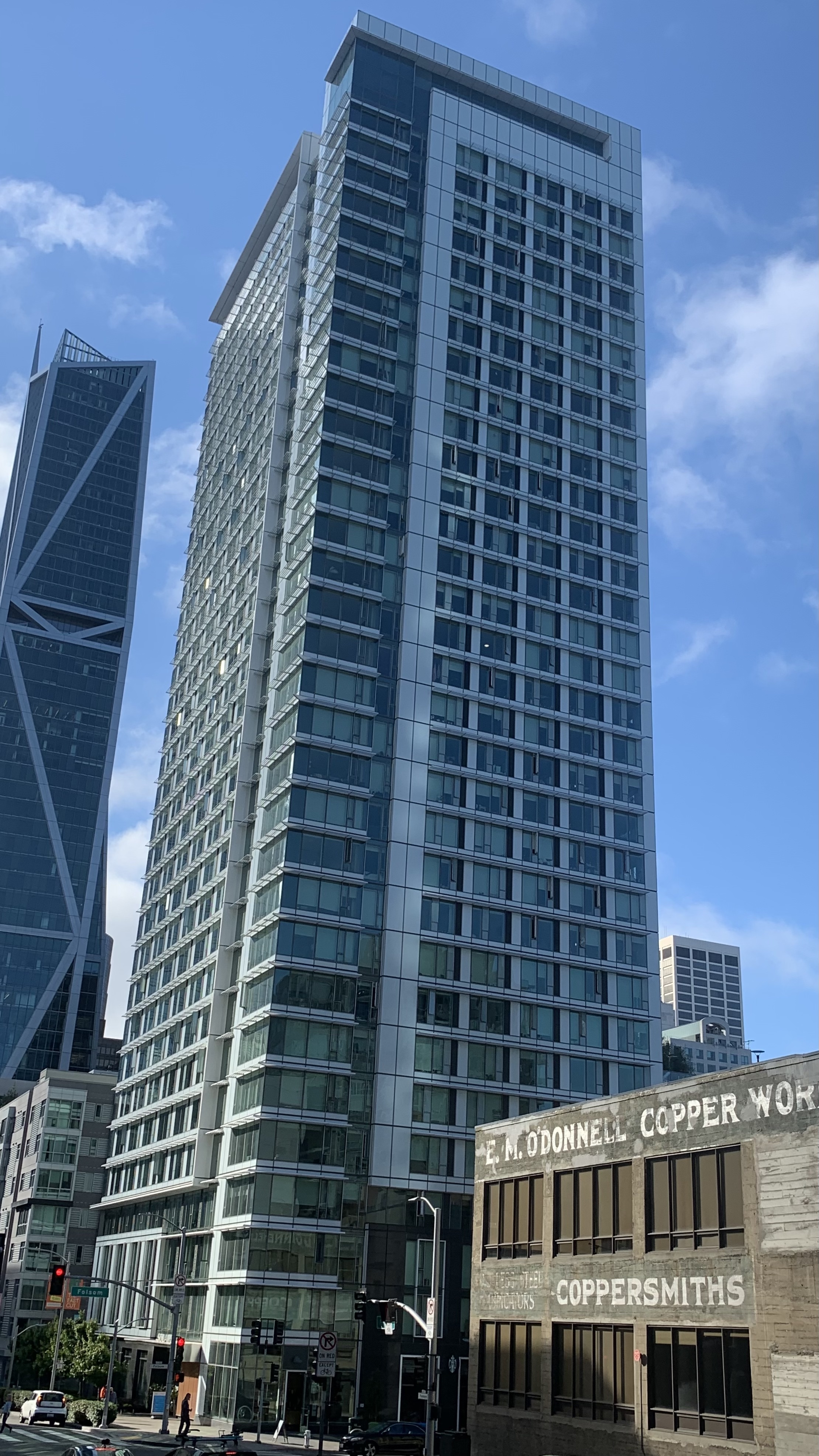
- In 2021

- Location within San Francisco Solaire (San Francisco) (California) Solaire (San Francisco) (the United States)
- Alternative names: Transbay Block 6 Tower

General information
- Status: Completed
- Type: Residential apartments
- Location: 299 Fremont Street; San Francisco, California
- Coordinates: 37.7879778°N 122.393875°W
- Construction started: 2014
- Completed: 2015

Height
- Architectural: 300 ft (91 m)
- Roof: 300 ft (91 m)

Technical details
- Floor count: 32

Design and construction
- Architects: Solomon Cordwell Buenz & Associates

BridgeView is a 300-foot (91 m) residential skyscraper in the Rincon Hill neighborhood of San Francisco, California. The tower has 32 floors.

== See also ==
- List of tallest buildings in San Francisco
