= Schmidt Lithograph building =

Coordinates: 37.78366°N 122.39409°W

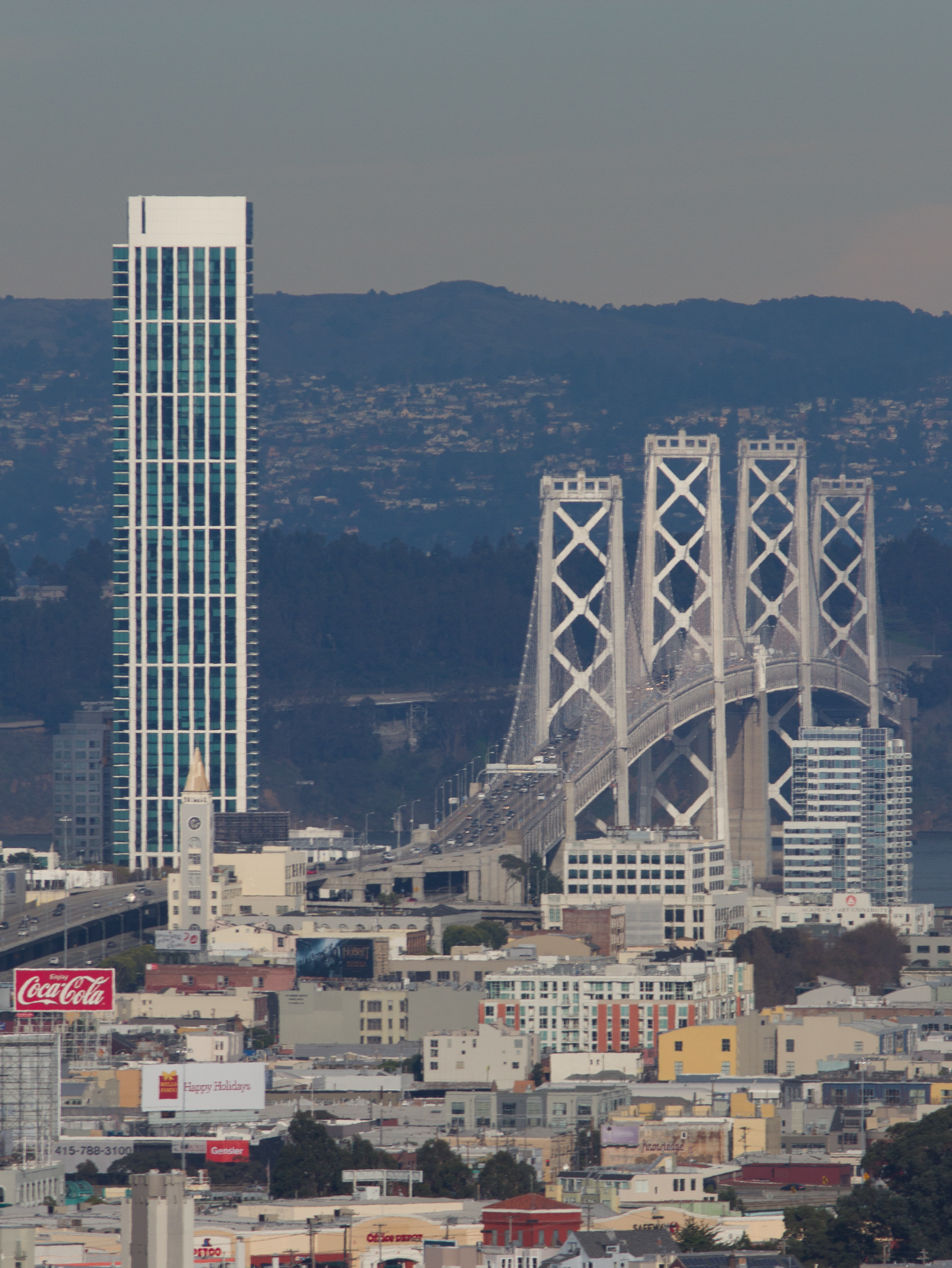
Schmidt Lithograph building (mid foreground, left)

The Schmidt Lithograph building, also known as the Clock Tower building and now Clocktower Lofts, is a former industrial building in the South Beach neighborhood of San Francisco, California, in the United States. (Note: The building is sometimes placed in SoMa or Rincon Hill.) Built in 1920–21 as part of the headquarters and printing plant of the Schmidt Lithograph Company, it is a contributing property in the South End Historic District. It was converted to condominiums in the early 1990s, with the address of 461 Second Street.

== History ==
Schmidt Lithograph was founded in 1872 by German immigrant Max Schmidt and incorporated in 1899 as Mutual Label & Lithographing Company. It became a prominent printing company in the western United States, particularly in the production of labels for fruit and other products. By the turn of the 20th century, it had built a three-story headquarters and printing plant on the site of Peter Donahue's mansion at Bryant and Second Streets in San Francisco. This building was destroyed in the fire that followed the 1906 earthquake, and in 1907 the company built a new plant on the same site, which opened in 1908. (Note: This source wrongly locates the building at Brannan Street.) The 6-story brick building with clock tower, designed by H. C. Baumann, was added in 1920–21, a third four-story reinforced concrete building in 1925, and an addition to the tower building, also reinforced concrete, in 1938.

The plant covered two square blocks and had roof gardens and facilities for employees including a hospital and handball and volleyball courts. The tower, which is 180 feet (55 m) tall, housed water storage and also served to identify the company; it was added after the Ghirardelli Chocolate Company, whose founder was a friend of Max Schmidt's, built a clock tower at their Ghirardelli Square plant. (Note: The penthouse at one time housed the chemical research department; there is no indication the tower was built to give engravers a light-filled work space.) Schmidt's will stipulated that a thermometer must be mounted on the exterior of the tower, a proposal that the board of directors had refused; the thermometer was added.

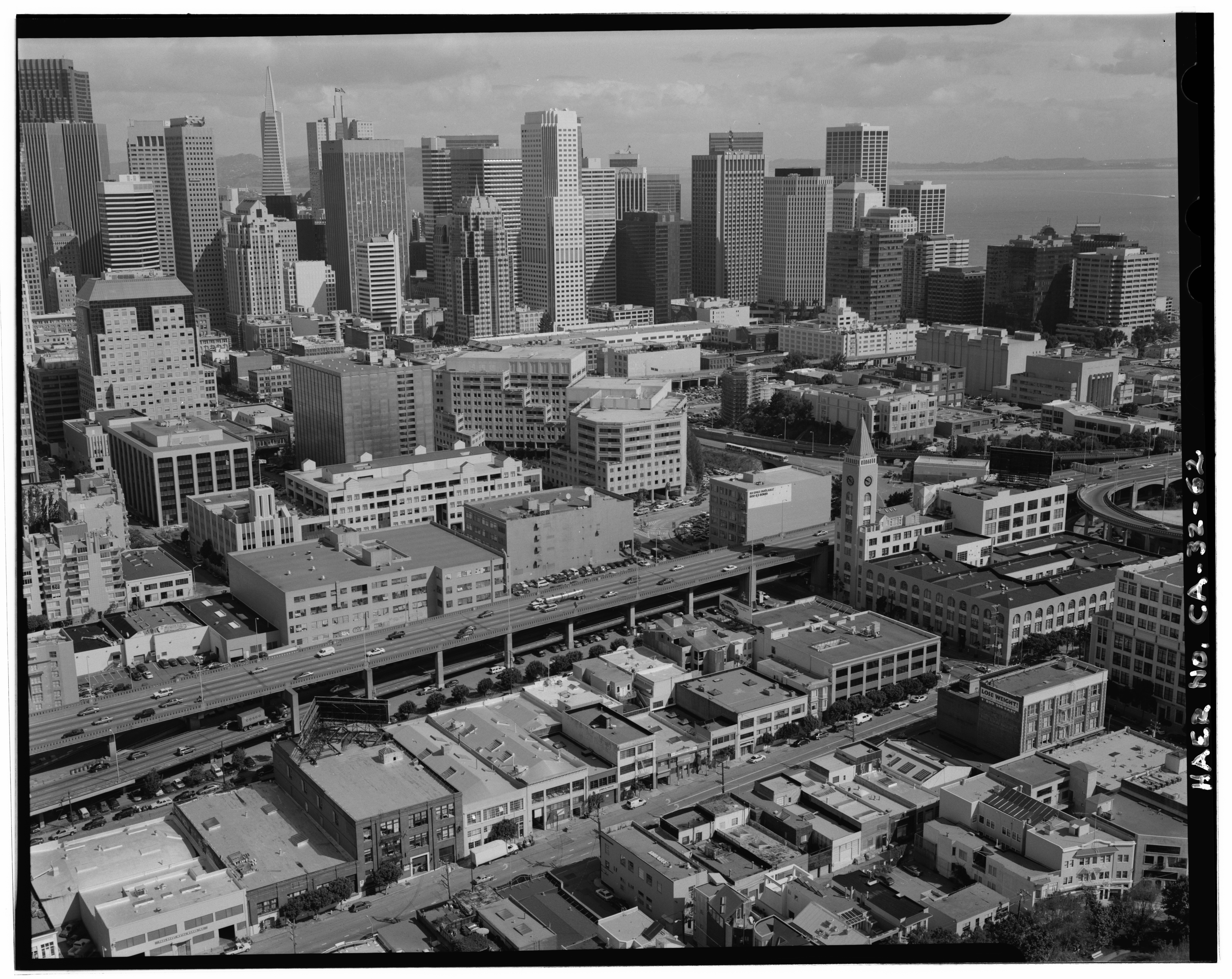
Aerial view of San Francisco approach to San Francisco-Oakland Bay Bridge, with the tower building beside ramps, 1998

When the San Francisco-Oakland Bay Bridge was built in the 1930s, six blocks of the industrial South of Market neighborhood were demolished to build the approach viaduct and ramps. Original plans were for the viaduct to follow Bryant Street, which would have cut through the site of the Schmidt plant. Max Schmidt threatened to move the company out of San Francisco, and the viaduct was rerouted to the north, between Bryant and Harrison Streets, necessitating a slight bend. A 1997 proposal for seismic retrofitting of the viaduct after the 1989 Loma Prieta earthquake would have reduced the distance between the clock tower building and the road decks from approximately 30 feet (9.1 m) to under 21 inches (53 cm).

On October 27, 2008, the City of San Francisco declared the clock tower building, 461 Second Street, and the 1925 building, Plant No. 2 at 501 2nd Street, contributing properties of the South End Historic District.

In the early 1990s, the former Schmidt plant was converted by McKenzie, Rose, and Halliday Development to 127 live-work condominiums, of which 27 are in the clock tower building, including a three-story penthouse apartment incorporating the tower. The architect for the restoration, which included creating a courtyard in the former main print hall and cladding the brick exterior of the tower building with stucco, was David Baker. The project won an award of merit for residential design excellence from the San Francisco chapter of the American Institute of Architects and the Design Excellence Award for adaptive use of the American Society of Interior Designers. It was one of the first residential conversions in the neighborhood. The clock continues to be maintained by specialists.

== Residents and tenants ==
- Ellen Ullman
- David Baker Architects
- Savant Investment Group.
