= David Baker (architect) =

American architect (born 1949)

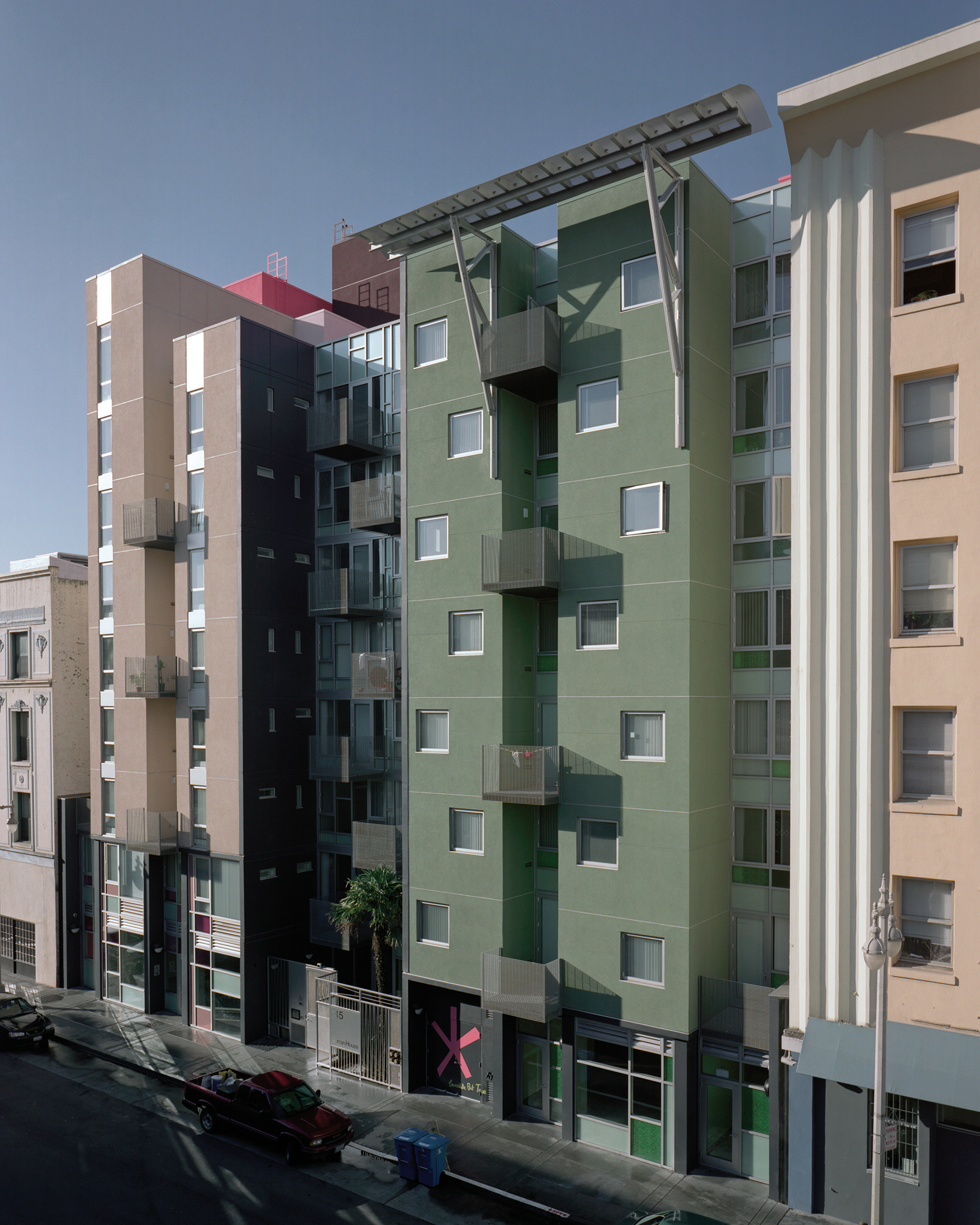
Curran House affordable family housing in the Tenderloin District of San Francisco

David Baker, FAIA LEED AP (born December 20, 1949), is an American architect based in San Francisco, California. He and his firm, David Baker Architects (with principals Daniel Simons and Amanda Loper), are known primarily for designing affordable housing projects, hotels, and condominium lofts, often in converted old industrial buildings. The 62-employee firm, formerly known as David Baker & Associates, was formed in 1982 and is based in San Francisco's Clocktower Building, a condominium conversion Baker designed in the former factory of the Schmidt Lithography Co., at one time the largest printing company on the West Coast.

== Early life ==
Baker was born in Grand Rapids, Michigan on December 20, 1949. He grew up in Michigan and in Tucson, Arizona, in a house designed by his self-educated father, Bernard Baker. He attended Phillips Exeter Academy, Thomas Jefferson College, University of Michigan, and University of California at Berkeley, where he earned a master's degree in architecture. Baker says that he decided to become an architect as a child, when his father gave him a book on famous architects.

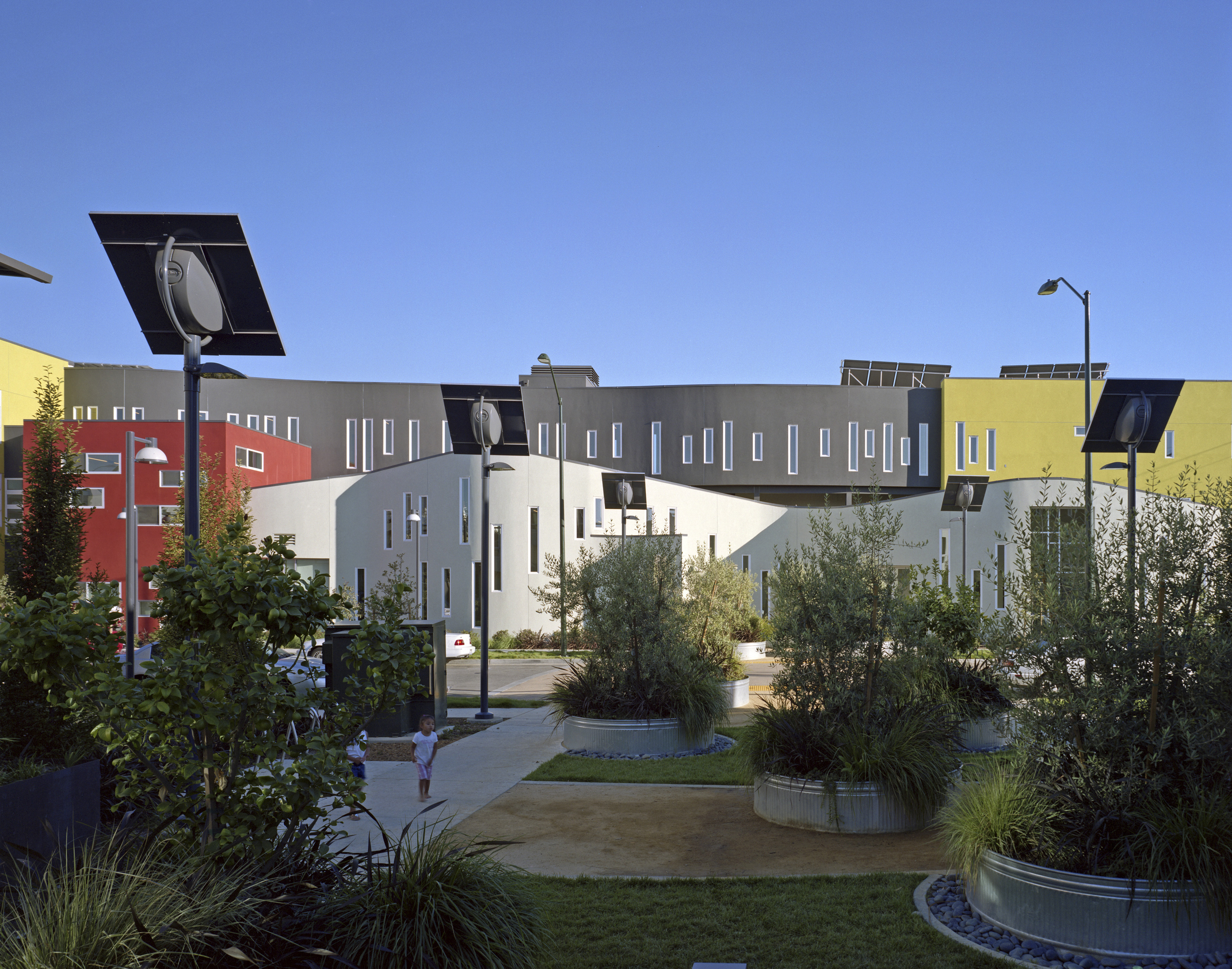
Tassafaronga Village LEED Platinum affordable housing in Oakland, California

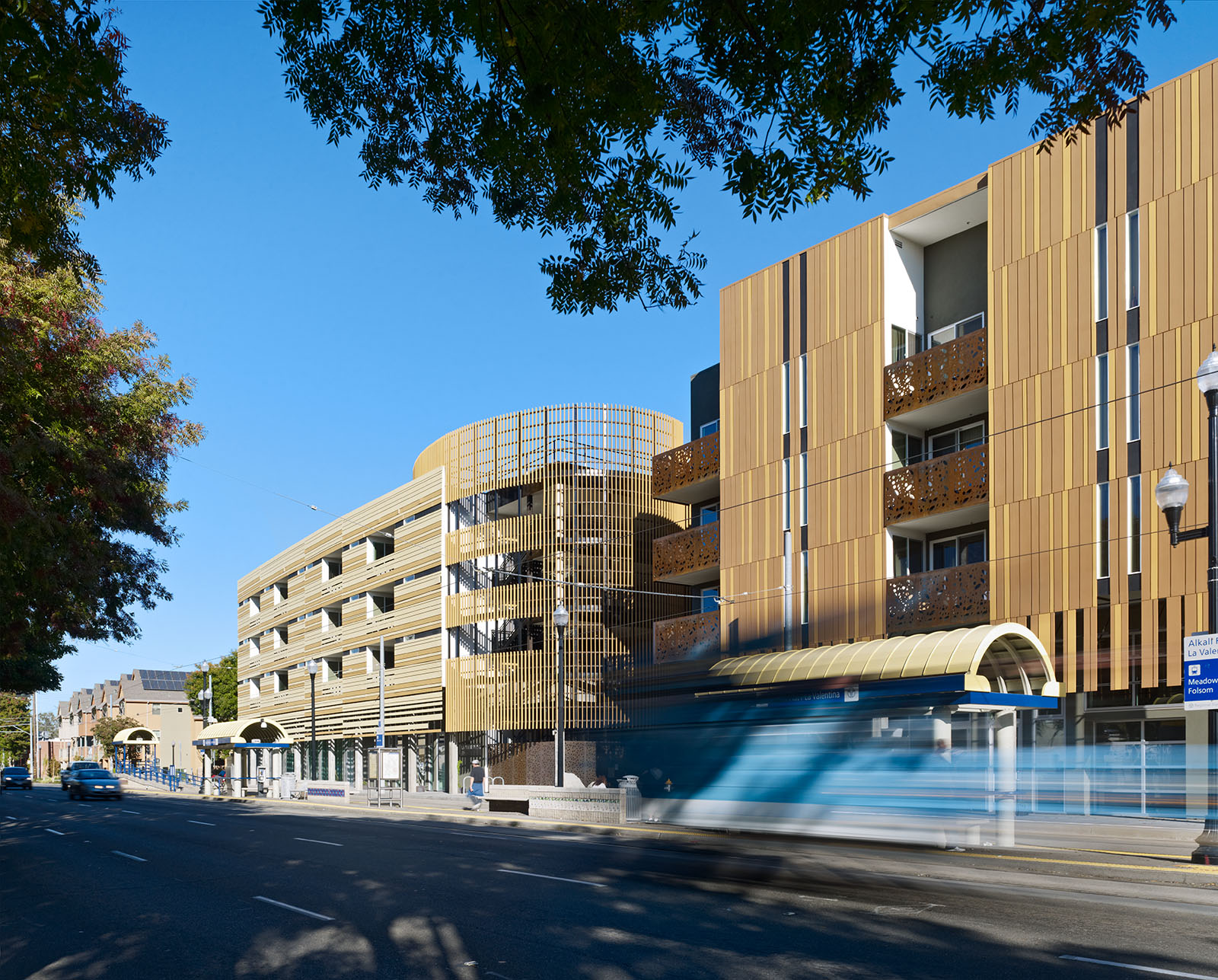
La Valentina Station affordable family housing at a light rail station in Sacramento

== Career ==
After college in the 1970s Baker formed Sol-Arc, an energy consulting firm. His present firm, David Baker Architects, was formed in 1982. Baker was elevated to Fellow of the American Institute of Architects in 1996.

In 2008, Baker was one of three architects selected for induction in the Builder Magazine's "Hall of Fame". One of Baker's projects, Soma Studios, was named one of the ten best new projects of the decade by a local critic.
