= Edwin Klockars' Blacksmith Shop =

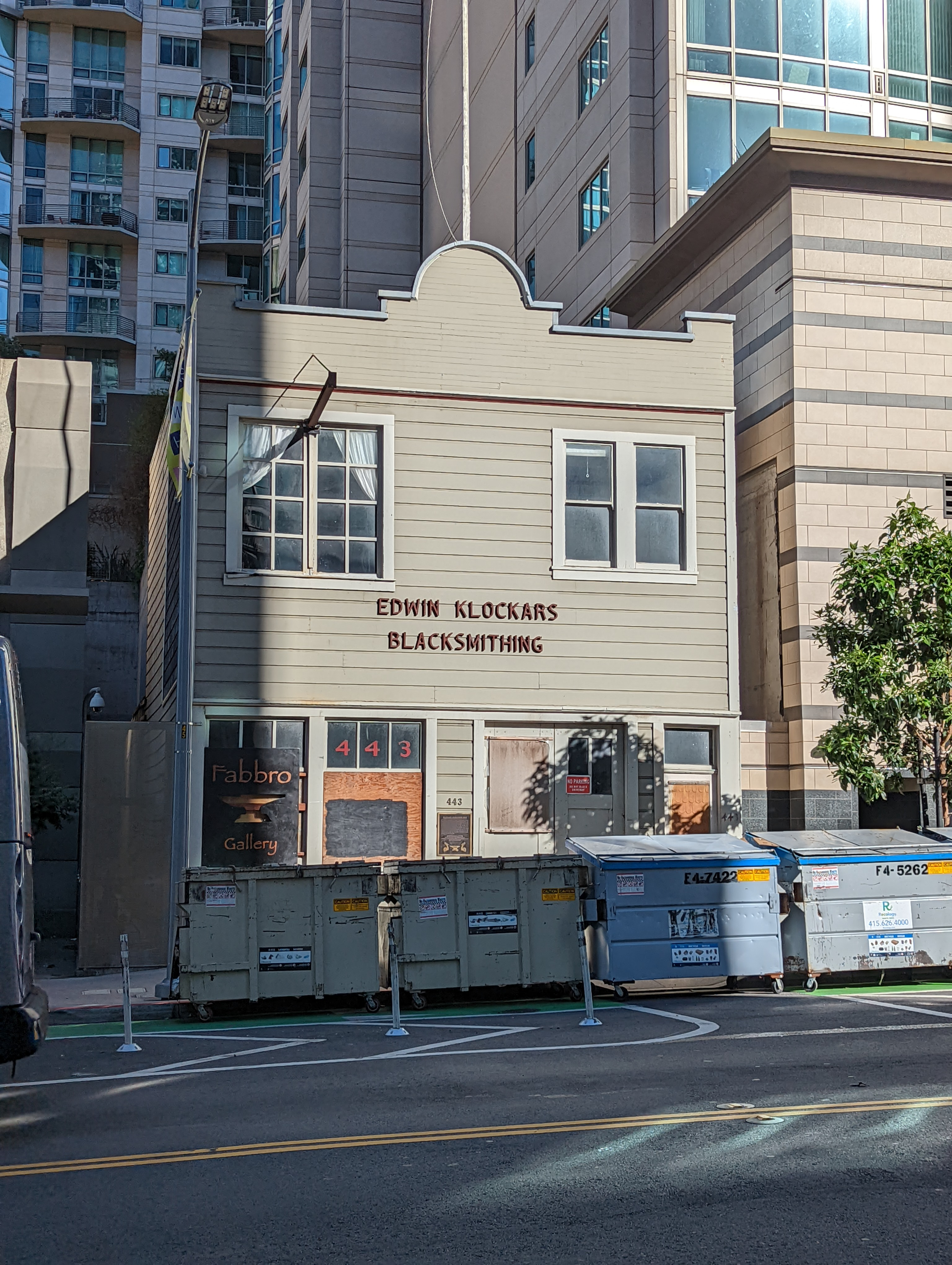

- Location within San Francisco County Location within California
- 37.787465°N 122.394106°W
- Location: 443 Folsom Street, San Francisco, California, United States

History
- Built: 1912; 114 years ago

San Francisco Designated Landmark
- Designated: June 12, 1982
- Reference no.: 149

Edwin Klockars' Blacksmith Shop is a historic 1912 building in the Rincon Hill neighborhood at 443 Folsom Street, San Francisco, California, United States. It remained an active blacksmith shop within multiple generations of the same family, from 1912 until 2017.

It has been listed by the city as a San Francisco Designated Landmark since 1992. The building also has a historical marker, erected in 2005 by Capitulus Redivivus Verba Buena.

== History ==
The shop initially was opened by Fred V. Wilbert. In 1928, Wilbert was joined by Edwin August Klockars (1898–1994), a blacksmith from the town of Munsmo in the Western Finland Province in Finland.

Tony Rosellini, the former son in-law of Edwin August Klockars, ran the blacksmith business from 1970 until its closure in 2017. There had been 2017 plans to restore the building and turn it into a retail marijuana shop, but as of 2023 the building remains unrestored as an art gallery.

== See also ==
- List of San Francisco Designated Landmarks
