= LUMINA =

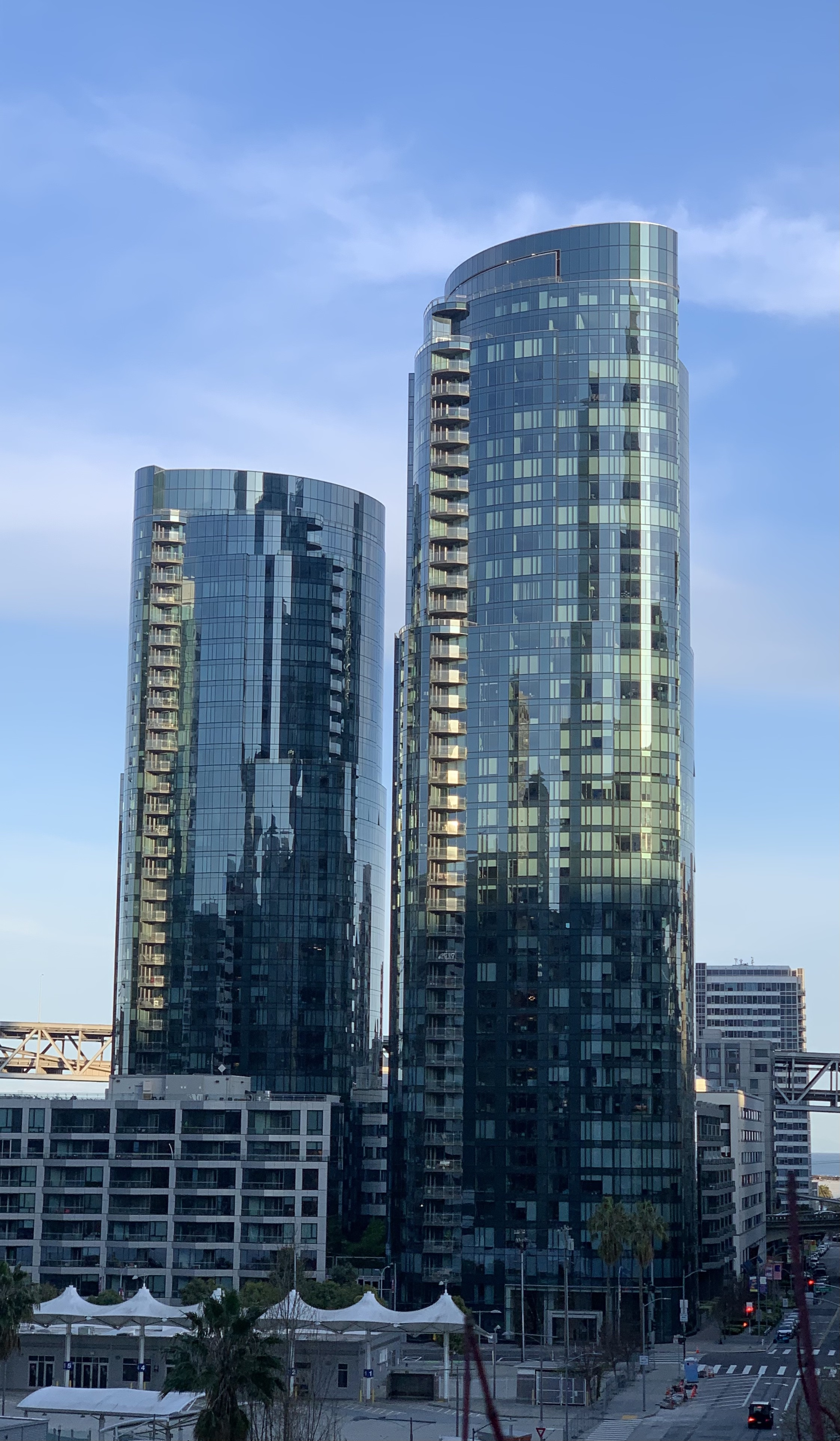
- View from Salesforce Park in 2021

- Location within San Francisco Location within California Location within the United States
- Alternative names: 201 Folsom Street

General information
- Status: Completed
- Type: Residential condominiums
- Architectural style: Modernism
- Location: 201 Folsom Street; San Francisco, California
- Coordinates: 37.7887°N 122.3919°W
- Construction started: 2013
- Completed: 2015–16
- Cost: US$620 million
- Owner: China Vanke; Tishman Speyer

Height
- Roof: Tower I: 400 ft (120 m); Tower II: 350 ft (110 m)

Technical details
- Floor count: Tower I: 42; Tower II: 37

Design and construction
- Architect: Arquitectonica Heller Manus Architects
- Developer: Tishman Speyer
- Structural engineer: Magnusson Klemencic Associates
- Main contractor: Lendlease

Other information
- Number of units: 655

LUMINA, also known as 201 Folsom Street, is a 655-unit residential condominium project in the Rincon Hill neighborhood of San Francisco. Developed by Tishman Speyer, it is located one block to the southwest of its sister project, The Infinity.

== History ==
The project was originally approved in September 2003 concurrently with its sister project, The Infinity. Tishman Speyer developed The Infinity first, completing it in 2009. Meanwhile, 201 Folsom Street was left unbuilt, and with its permits set to expire, Tishman Speyer was granted a three-year extension in 2009. After being redesigned by Arquitectonica, another 12-month extension was granted in 2012.

In February 2013, Tishman Speyer announced that it had formed a joint venture with China Vanke to develop 201 Folsom Street. According to Reuters, China Vanke agreed to contribute $175 million for a 70% stake, and Tishman Speyer $75 million for a 30% stake. The remainder of the project's $620 million cost was to be financed with debt. Tishman Speyer received its building permits in May 2013 and construction commenced in June.

201 Folsom I, located at the corner of Folsom and Beale, stands 400 feet (120 m) and 42 stories tall. 201 Folsom II, located along Main Street, stands 350 feet (110 m) and 37 stories tall. Ceremonial groundbreaking took place on June 26, 2013, and the project was named LUMINA. Construction was expected to take about 23 months. Residents began moving into the complex in August 2015.

== Gallery ==
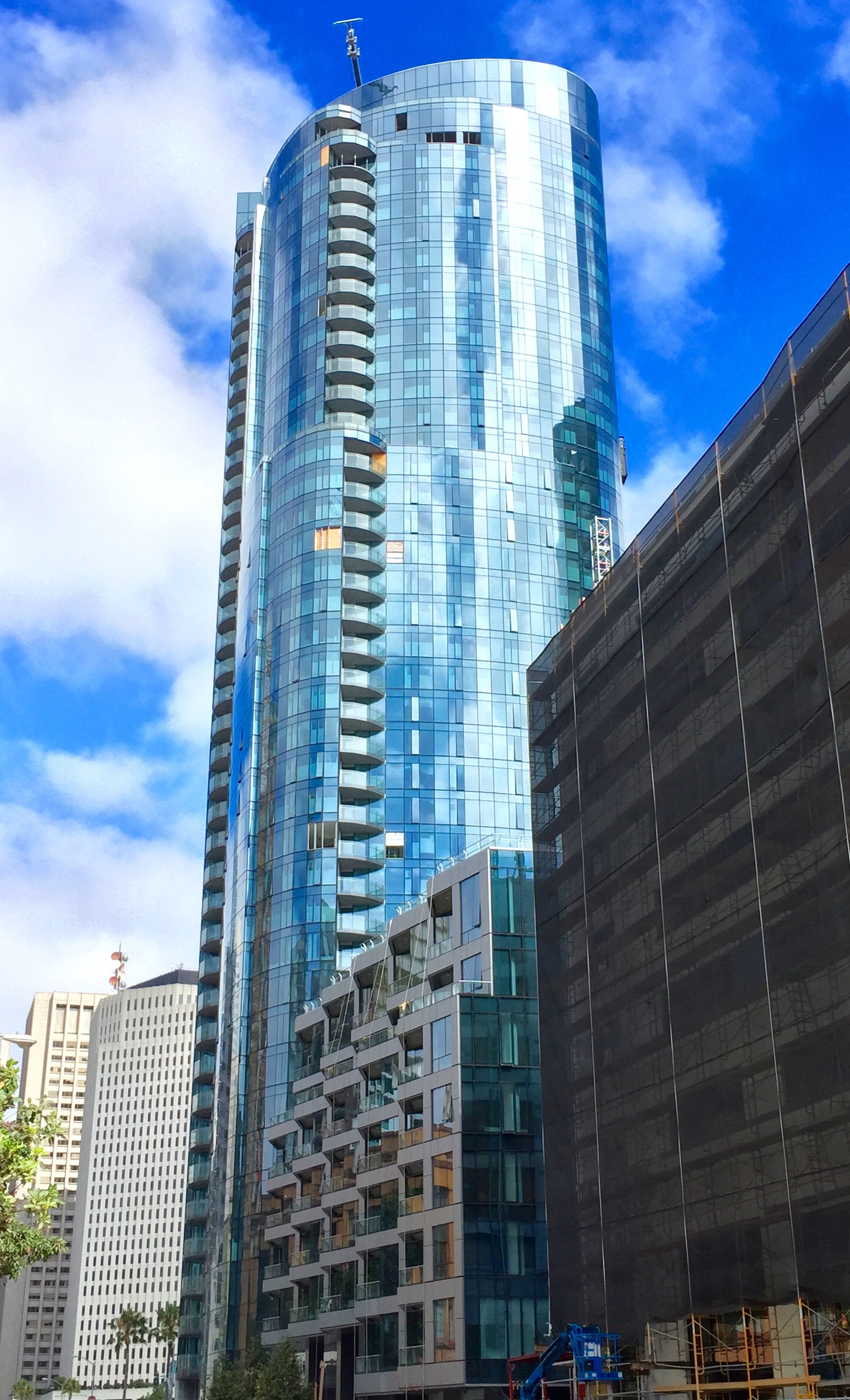
Tower 1, South View in 2015

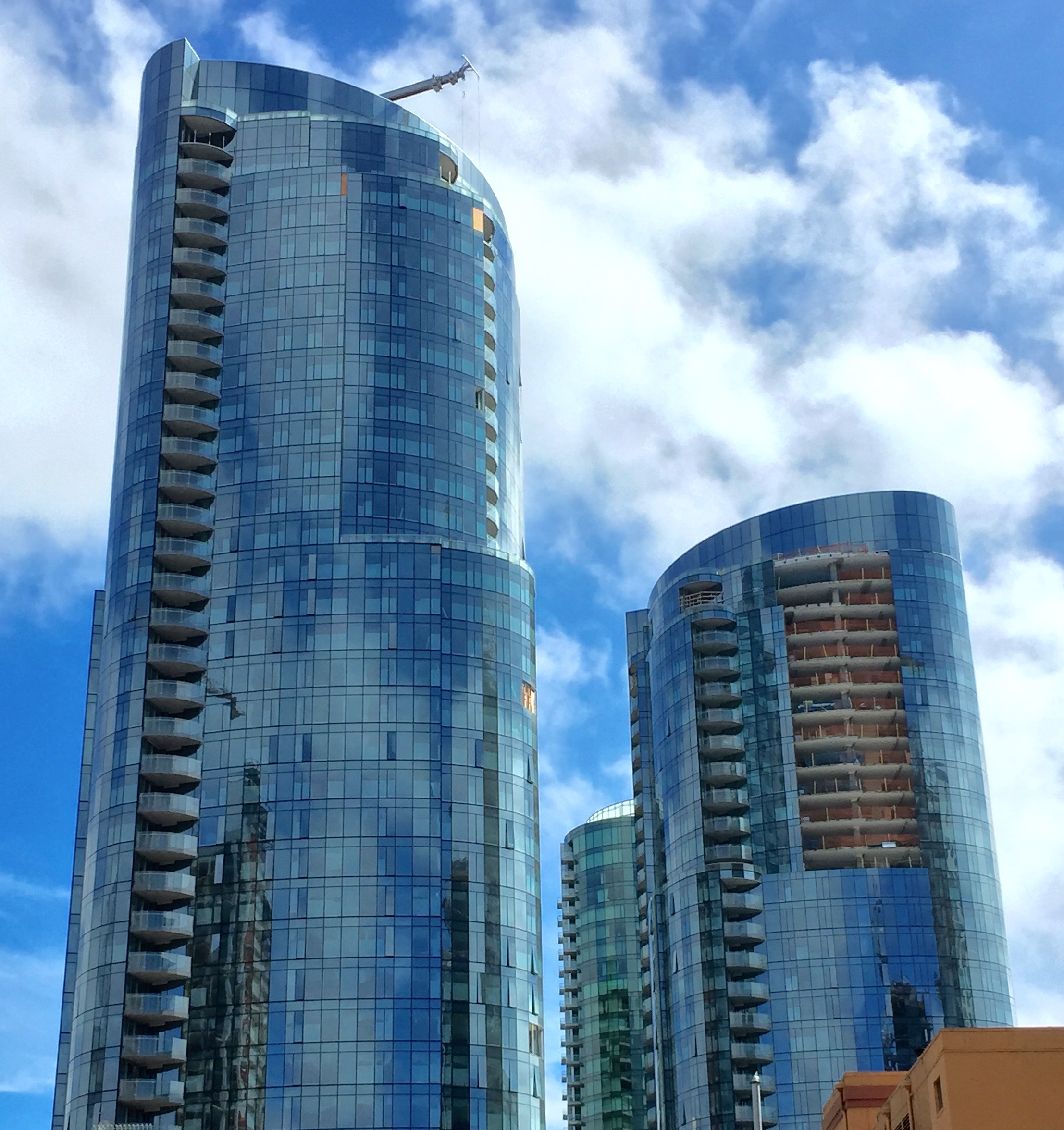
West View, 2015

== See also ==
- List of tallest buildings in San Francisco
