= Rincon Point (San Francisco) =

Coordinates: 37°47′20″N 122°23′13″W

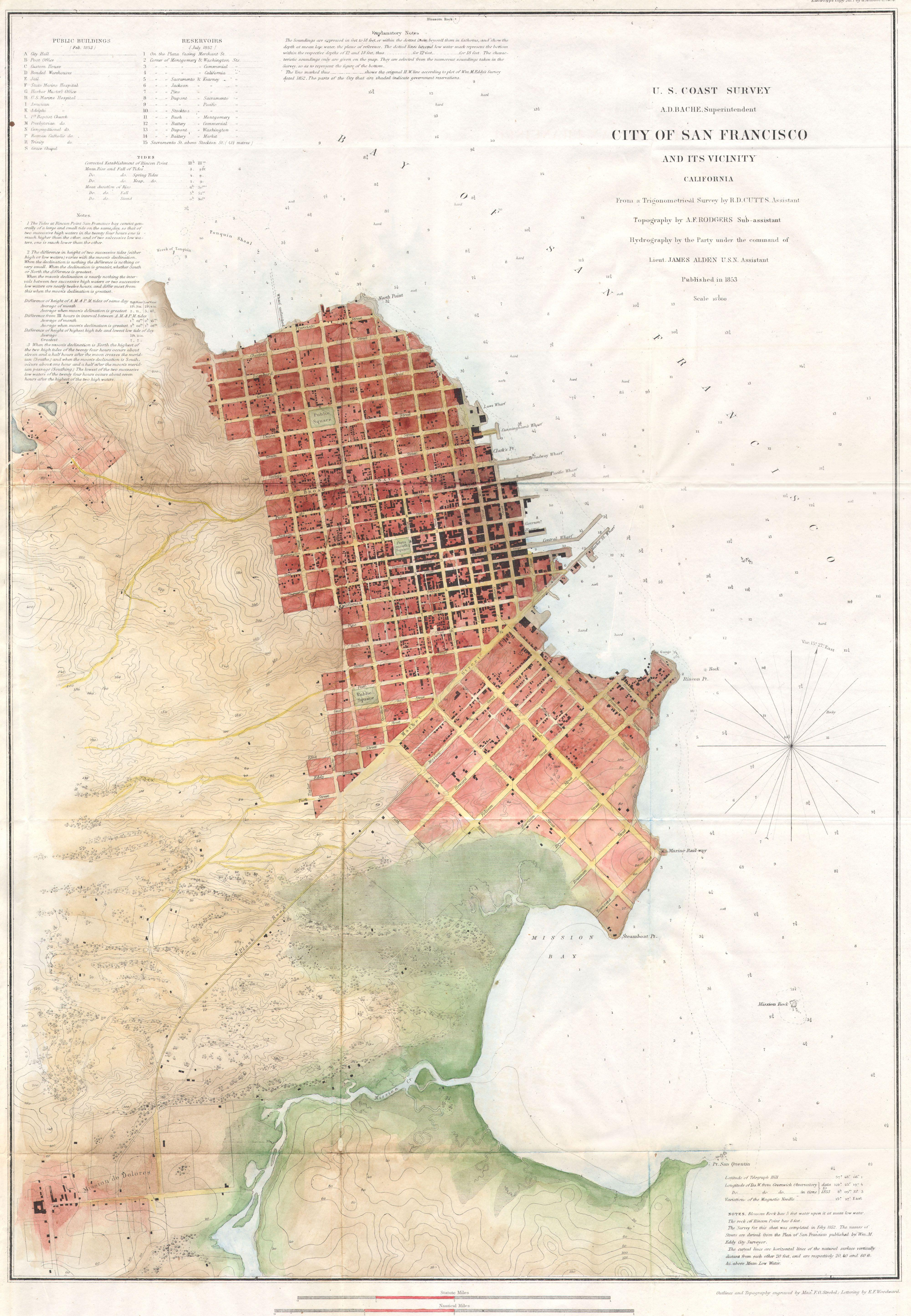
The Shoreline of San Francisco in 1853. Rincon Point stands out into the Bay on the south side of Yerba Buena Cove.

Rincon Point, was a cape marking the southern extremity of Yerba Buena Cove in what is now San Francisco, California. Rincón is Spanish for "corner", and the point formed the southern corner of the cove.

The historical Rincon Point would be today located approximately along Spear Street from Harrison to Folsom Street. That area is now covered in land fill that extends to The Embarcadero. The United States Geological Survey now treats Rincon Point as being located at the foot of Pier 26, directly under the San Francisco–Oakland Bay Bridge.
