= Clarks Point (San Francisco) =

Cape in San Francisco, United States of America

Coordinates: 37°47′55″N 122°24′04″W

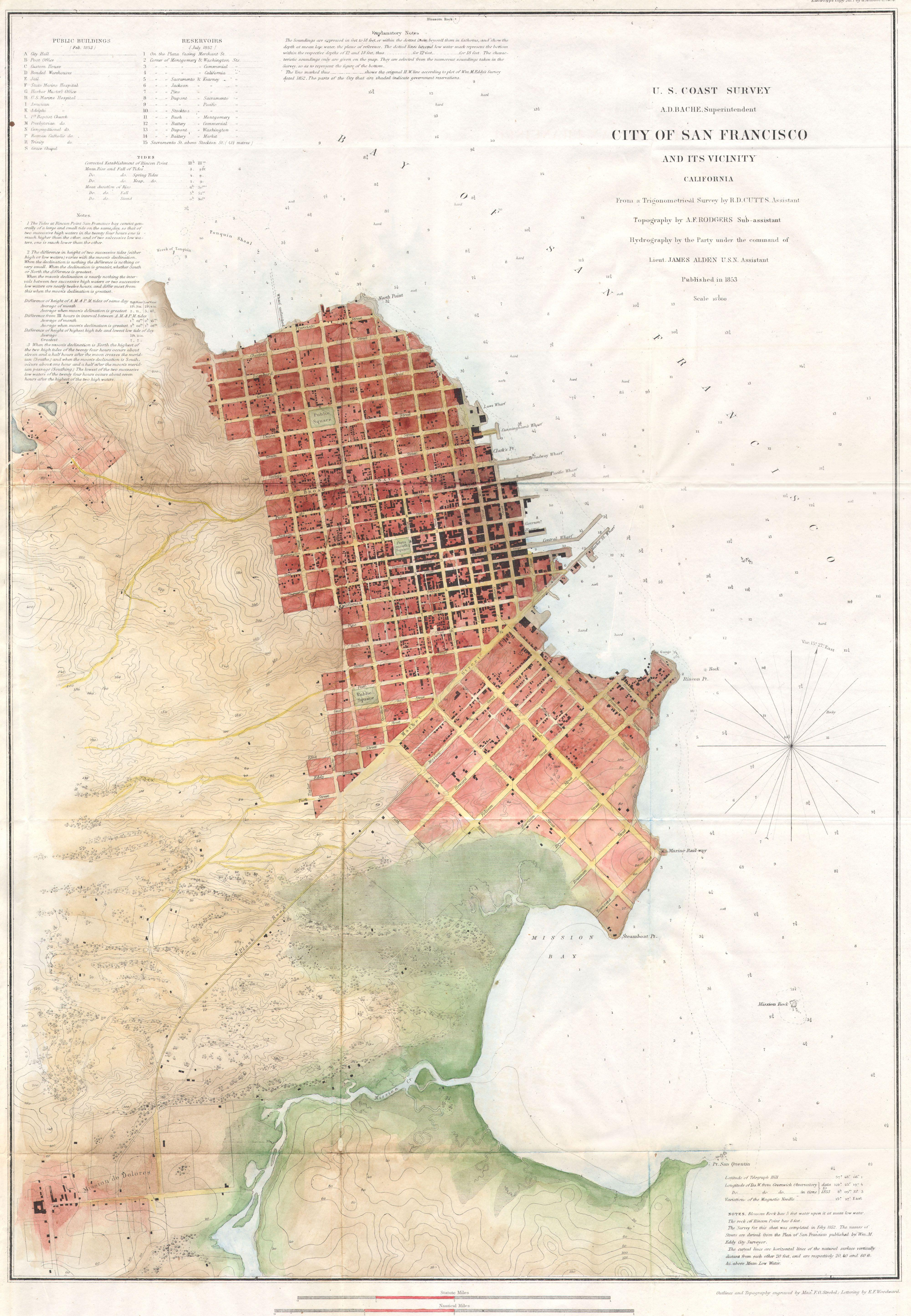
The Shoreline of San Francisco in 1853. Clarks Point has already been engulfed by the filling of the Yerba Buena Cove north of the Market Street Wharf.

Clarks Point was a cape on the north side of Yerba Buena Cove in what is now San Francisco, California.

Its former Spanish name was Punta del Embarcadero. During the California Gold Rush the Clarks Point and the Cove was filled in to form the Embarcadero on San Francisco Bay. The location of the Point is just east of the intersection of Battery Street on Broadway.
