= Central Embarcadero Piers Historic District =

Historic district in California, United States

- U.S. National Register of Historic Places
- U.S. Historic district
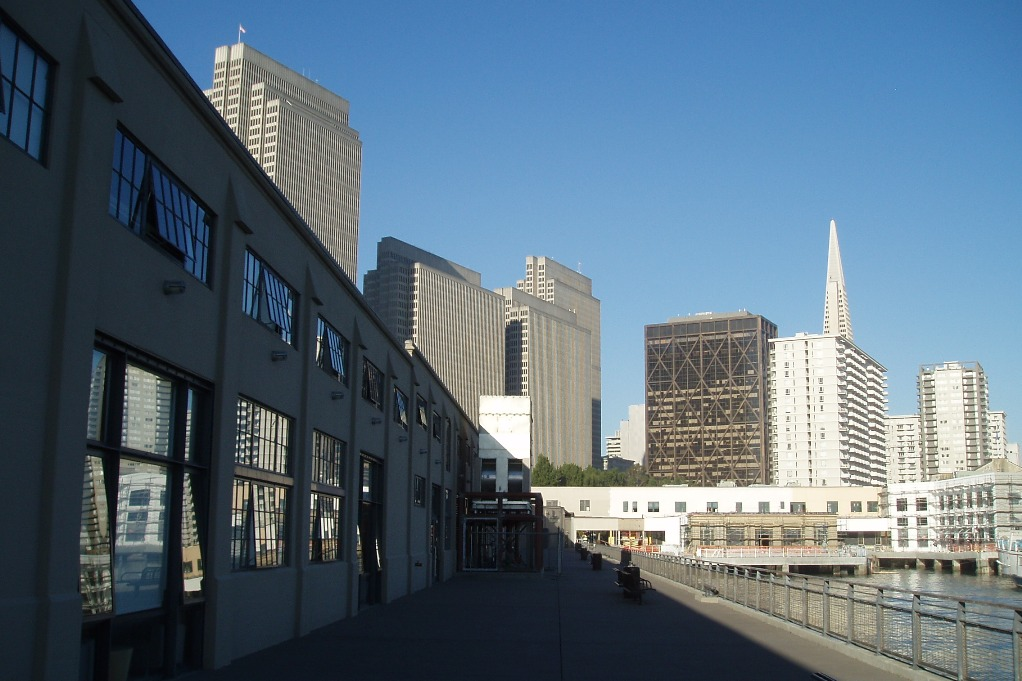
- View of Pier 1 with Downtown San Francisco in background

- Location within San Francisco County Location within California Location within the United States
- Location: Piers 1, 1½, 3 and 5, The Embarcadero; San Francisco, California
- Coordinates: 37°47′58″N 122°23′42″W
- Area: 6.6 acres (2.7 ha)
- Built: 1918
- Architectural style: Beaux Arts
- NRHP reference No.: 02001390
- Added to NRHP: November 20, 2002

The Central Embarcadero Piers Historic District is a Registered Historic District in the city of San Francisco, California, United States. It consists of Piers 1, 1½, 3 and 5, which form one of the largest surviving pier complexes along San Francisco's Embarcadero waterfront road. It was added to the National Register of Historic Places in 2002.

== Construction ==
With construction spanning over a decade and led by Chief Engineer of the State Harbor Commission, Frank G. White, Piers 1, 1½, 3 and 5, were opened in 1918. Unlike the piers south of the Ferry Building that were designed in the Mission and Gothic Revival styles, the piers north of the Ferry Building were built in the Beaux-Arts architecture style, similar to New York City's Chelsea Piers. The timber-frame bulkhead buildings, covered in stucco, are each two stories high, punctuated by two-story arches. Behind these formal building are the areas more closely associated with the functioning of the port—the piers and transit sheds. Concrete or timber piers extend east behind the bulkhead buildings, connected to the system of wharves upon which the bulkhead buildings rest. Steel truss and timber-frame buildings, accommodating the loading and unloading of ships are built upon the piers, with open aprons for circulation.

== Early history ==
These were the only group of piers in the Port of San Francisco dedicated chiefly to inland trade and transport. These connections facilitated the growth of communities in the Sacramento and San Joaquin Valleys and fostered California's agricultural business that led the state to become the richest in the nation, as well the fifth largest economy in the world. The Delta King and Delta Queen provided overnight connections between San Francisco and Sacramento from Pier 1½, making it an important gateway for public travel to the interior of the state. Pier 3 and Pier 5 served primarily freight shipping, with a variety of companies sharing the bulkhead office and warehouse spaces and the huge transit sheds which originally extended the full length of the finger piers for more than 700 feet (212 m) east from the wharf on the Embarcadero.

== World War II ==
The San Francisco waterfront piers played a crucial role in the Pacific theater during World War II. With the outbreak of the war, San Francisco's waterfront became a military logistics center; troops, equipment and supplies left the Port in support of the Pacific theater. Almost every pier and wharf was involved in military activities, with troop ships and naval vessels tied up all along the Embarcadero. In addition, the military briefly set up antiaircraft guns and searchlights at piers along the waterfront from 1941 to 1942. The Coast Guard, Immigration and Naturalization Service and the Maritime Service Enrolling Office occupied Pier 5.

== Modern times ==
After the war, the piers fell into disuse, as ports in Oakland, Alameda and Richmond were better equipped to respond to the conversion to containerization. Piers 1½ and 5 were early examples of finding new uses for buildings which form a valuable part of the city's environment. The former Passenger Waiting Room of Pier 1½ was converted into an architect's waterfront office, and the bulkheads of Piers 1½ and 5 were used as professional office space. While many of the piers were demolished, Piers 1 ½, 3 and 5 remain the most visible from the Ferry Building and Market Street, still the main thoroughfare of the city.

In January 2001, San Francisco based Pacific Waterfront Partners, LLC was selected by the Port of San Francisco to redevelop the historic Piers 1½, 3 and 5. The project focuses on preserving and rehabilitating the historic maritime design of the Northeast Waterfront and the Ferry Building Waterfront while enhancing the public use and access to the historic and scenic waterfront setting.
