= Embarcadero (San Francisco) =

Waterfront and street on San Francisco Bay

The Embarcadero
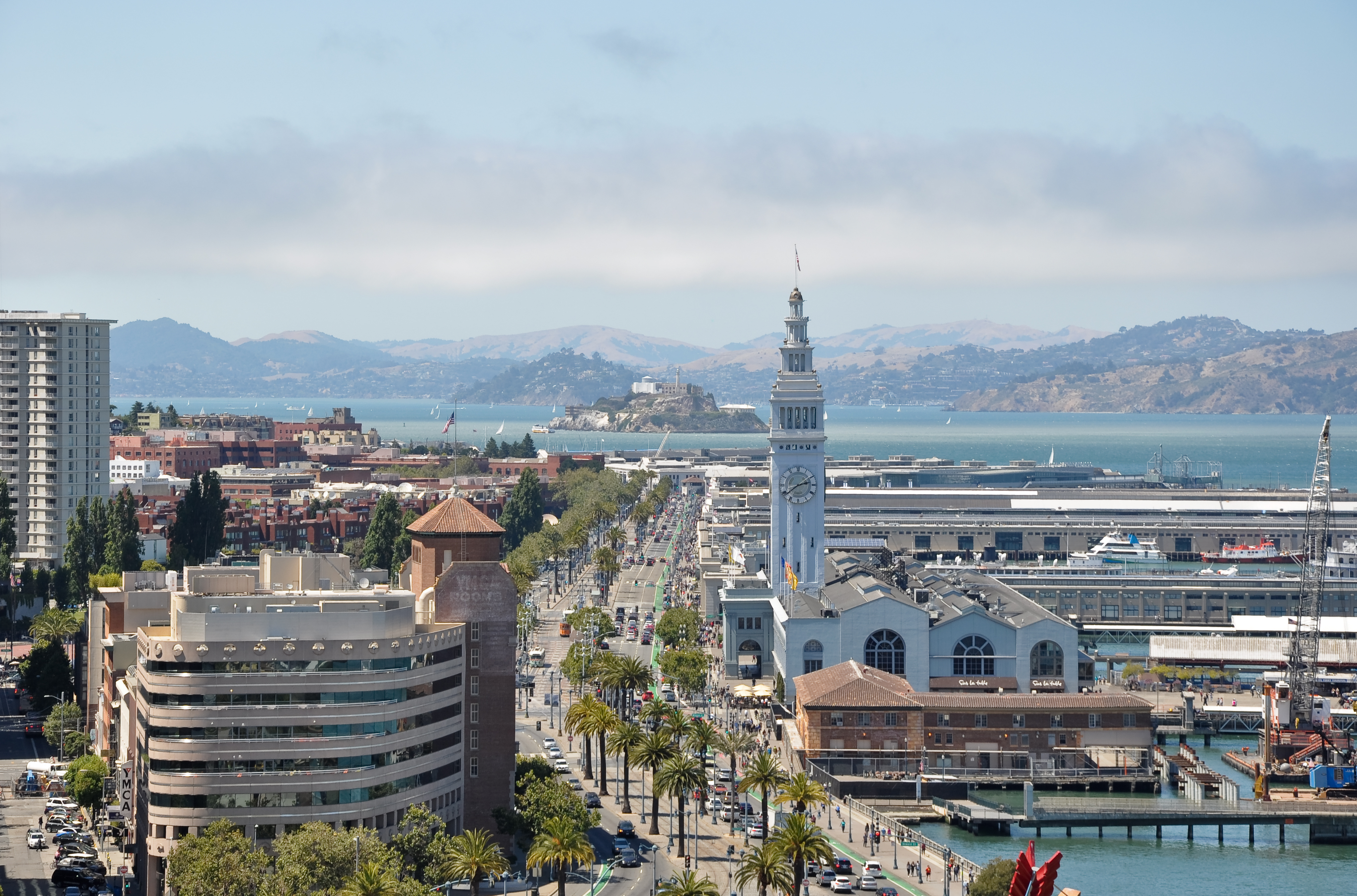
- The Embarcadero photographed from southeast, with the Ferry Building to the right and Alcatraz Island in the distance
- Interactive map of The Embarcadero
- Maintained by: San Francisco DPW
- Nearest metro station: Embarcadero station
- Southeast end: Second Street / King Street
- Major junctions: Folsom Street; Howard Street; Mission Street; Market Street; Broadway; Kearny Street
- Northwest end: Pier 45
- Central Embarcadero Piers Historic District
- U.S. National Register of Historic Places
- U.S. Historic district
- Location: Piers 1, 1½, 3 and 5, The Embarcadero; San Francisco, California
- Coordinates: 37.7986°N 122.3969°W
- Area: 6.6 acres (2.7 ha)
- Built: 1918
- Architectural style: Beaux Arts
- NRHP reference No.: 02001390
- Added to NRHP: November 20, 2002

The Embarcadero (Spanish for "Embarkment") is the eastern waterfront of Port of San Francisco and a major roadway in San Francisco, California, United States. It was constructed on reclaimed land along a three mile long engineered seawall, from which piers extend into the bay. It derives its name from the Spanish verb embarcar, meaning "to embark"; embarcadero itself means "the place to embark." The Central Embarcadero Piers Historic District was added to the National Register of Historic Places on November 20, 2002.

The Embarcadero right-of-way begins at the intersection of Second and King Streets near Oracle Park, and travels north, passing under the San Francisco–Oakland Bay Bridge. The Embarcadero continues north past the Ferry Building at Market Street, Pier 39, and Fisherman's Wharf, before ending at Pier 45. A section of The Embarcadero which ran between Folsom Street and Drumm Street was formerly known as East Street.

For three decades, until it was torn down in 1991, the Embarcadero Freeway dominated the area. The subsequent redevelopment and restoration efforts have, according to the National Trust for Historic Preservation, "contributed to a remarkable urban waterfront renaissance", with the Embarcadero Historic District serving as a "major economic engine for the Bay Area".

== History ==
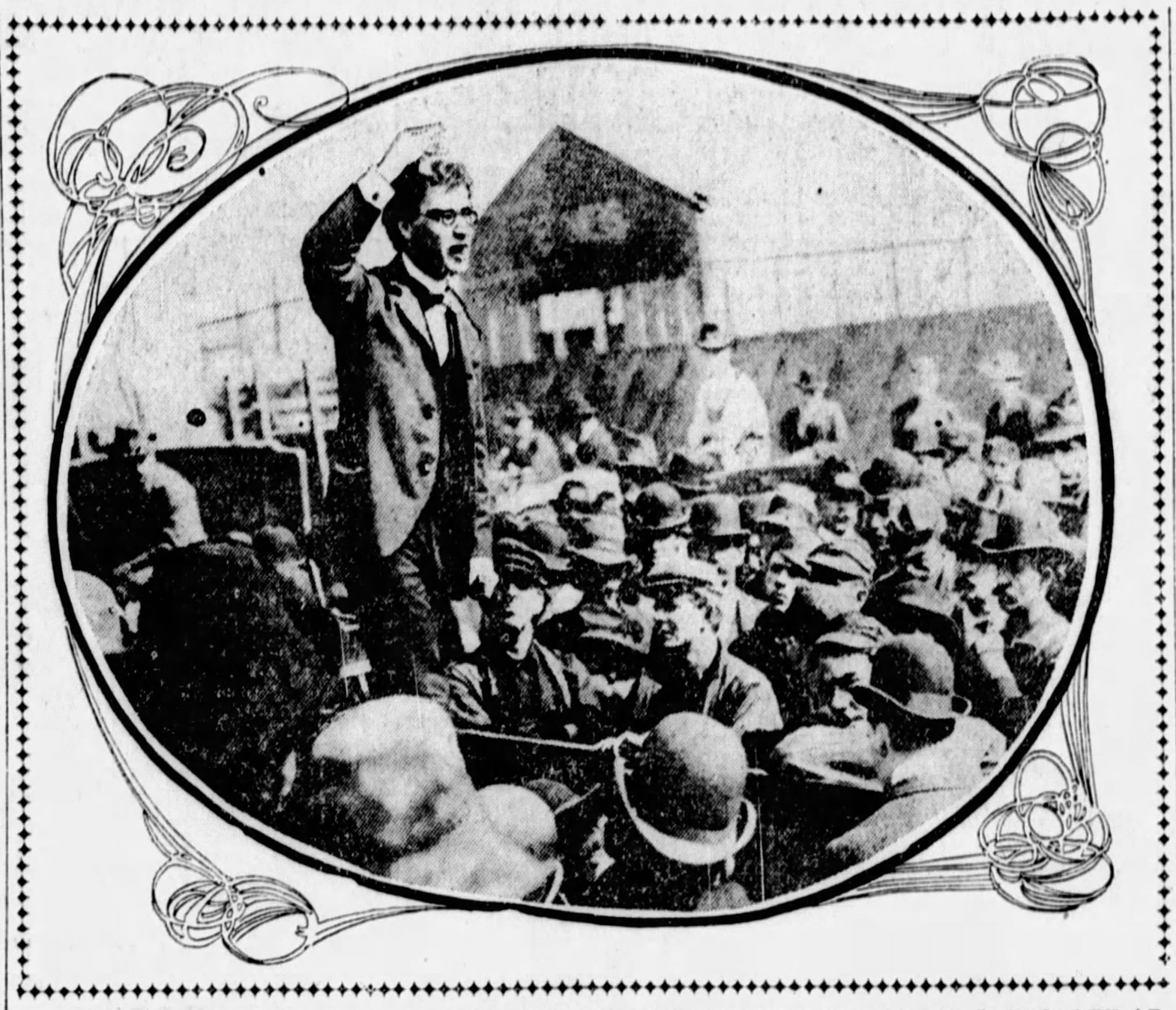
Congressional candidate Edward J. Livernash gives a speech at the Pacific Mail Docks on the corner of 1st and Brannan Streets, October 17, 1902

San Francisco's shoreline historically ran south and inland from Clark's Point below Telegraph Hill to present-day Montgomery Street and eastward toward Rincon Point, enclosing an inlet named Yerba Buena Cove. Over fifty years, a large offshore seawall was built and the mudflats filled, creating what today is San Francisco's Financial District. The San Francisco Belt Railroad, a short line railroad for freight, ran along The Embarcadero; its former enginehouse has been preserved. The roadway follows the seawall, a boundary first established in the 1860s and not completed until the 1920s.

During the early-20th century when the seaport was at its busiest and before the construction of the Bay Bridge, Pier 1, Pier 1½, Pier 3 and Pier 5 were dedicated chiefly to inland trade and transport. These connections facilitated the growth of communities in the Sacramento- and San Joaquin Valleys and fostered California's agricultural business. Today, these piers comprise the Central Embarcadero Piers Historic District. The Delta Queen docked at Pier 1½, ferrying people between San Francisco and Sacramento. There was once a pedestrian footbridge that connected Market Street directly with the Ferry building and a subterranean roadway.

During World War II, San Francisco's waterfront became a military logistics center; troops, equipment and supplies left the Port in support of the Pacific theater. Almost every pier and wharf was involved in military activities, with troop ships and naval vessels tied up all along the Embarcadero.

However, after the completion of the Bay Bridge and the rapid decline of ferries and the Ferry Building, the neighborhood fell into decline. The transition to container shipping, which moved most shipping to Oakland, led to further decline. Automobile transit efforts led to the Embarcadero Freeway being built in the 1950s. This improved automobile access to the Bay Bridge, but detracted aesthetically from the city. For 30 years, the freeway divided the waterfront and the Ferry Building from downtown. It was torn down in 1991, after being severely damaged in the 1989 Loma Prieta earthquake.

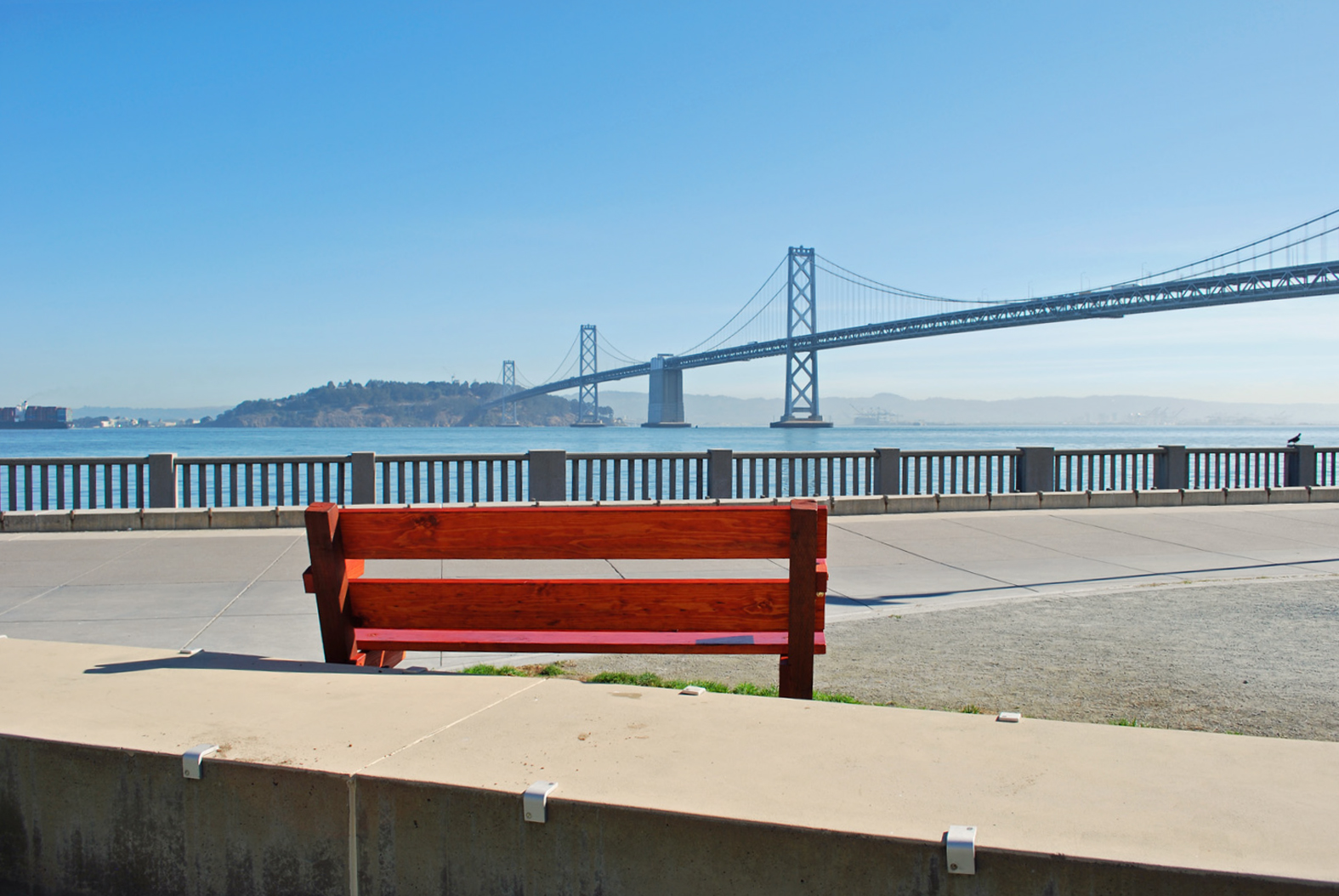
View of Yerba Buena Island, Bay Bridge and the city of Oakland in the distance

After the freeway had been cleared, massive redevelopment began as a grand palm-lined boulevard was created, squares and plazas were created and/or restored, and Muni's N Judah and T Third Street and F Market & Wharves lines were extended to run along it, with the N and T lines going south from Market Street to Fourth and King Streets (at Oracle Park and the Caltrain station) and the F line going north from Market to Fisherman's Wharf. The Muni also relaunched the ‘E’ line which was historically a seasonal service connecting Fishermans' Wharf to the Caltrain Depot, on weekends between Jefferson and Jones adjacent Fisherman's Wharf and Fourth and King streets near the Caltrain terminus, however this line was suspended during the Covid-19 pandemic and has not returned to service.

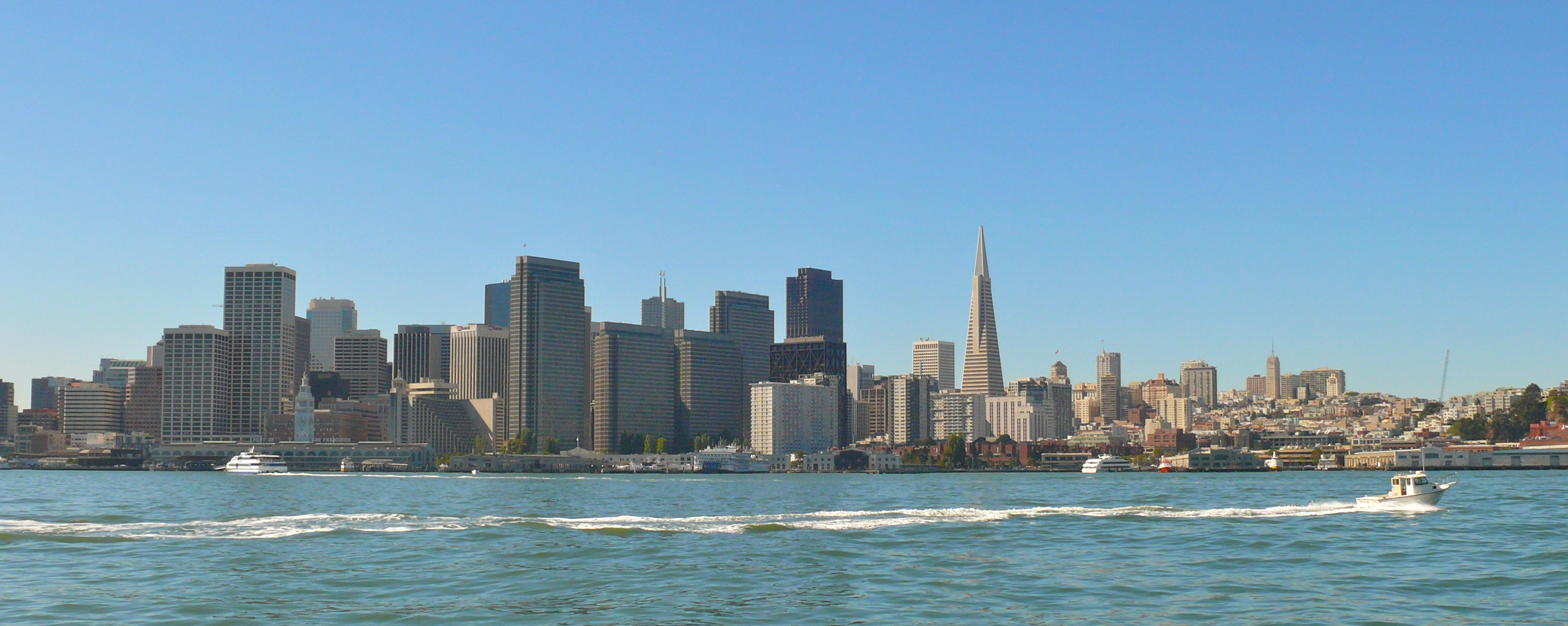
View from the bay 2007

The sidewalk along the waterfront between China Basin and Fisherman's Wharf was named "Herb Caen Way..." after the death of celebrated local columnist Herb Caen in 1997. The three dots, or ellipsis, deliberately are included in honor of columnist Herb Caen's Pulitzer Prize winning writing style.

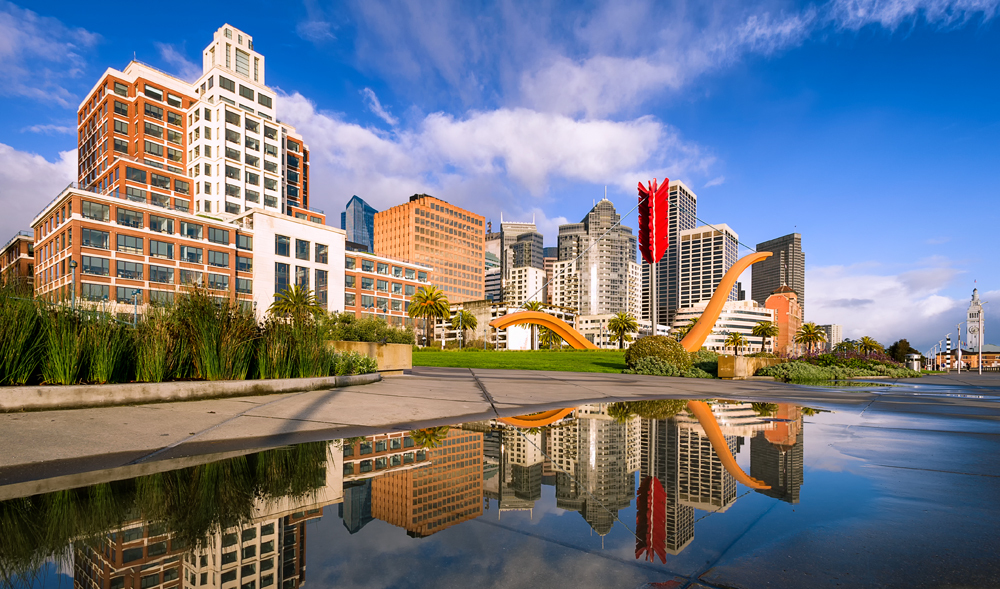
Rincon Park and Cupid's Span with the San Francisco skyline and the Embarcadero in the background

A large public sculpture, Cupid's Span, by Claes Oldenburg and Coosje van Bruggen, was installed in 2002 along the Rincon Park area. Resembling Cupid's bow and arrow with the arrow implanted in the ground, the artists stated that the statue was inspired by San Francisco's reputation as the home port of Eros, hence the stereotypical bow and arrow of Cupid.

In 2016, the Embarcadero was named on the list of "11 Most Endangered Historic Places" in the US by the National Trust for Historic Preservation, citing "the dual natural threats of sea-level rise and seismic vulnerability" to the seawall.

== Subway station ==
Embarcadero Station, a BART and Muni Metro subway station, is located at the foot of Market Street, one block from The Embarcadero. While not in the original transit system plans, it has become the most highly trafficked BART station. As it is an infill station, the design is unique among the Market Street subway.

== Embarcadero Center ==
Embarcadero Center consists of four 30- to 45-story buildings and the Hyatt Regency San Francisco, located between the Ferry Building and the foot of Market Street. Until 2001, there was a viewing deck on top of the Embarcadero Center. During the winter holidays, the edges of all four buildings are illuminated, the effect resembling the outlines of four giant books on a shelf.

== Embarcadero Plaza ==
At the eastern end of Market Street is Embarcadero Plaza, opened in 1972 and originally named Justin Herman Plaza, for M. Justin Herman, head of the San Francisco Redevelopment Agency from 1959 to 1971.

== Education ==
Right along the Embarcadero Center is the Embarcadero YMCA, the city's flagship branch of a group of a dozen locales. The center features the unique Youth Chance High School, an alternative high school that is a magnet for troubled students from throughout the Bay Area.

The Embarcadero area was the test site for one of the most famous experiments in urban planning education, when in 1978 renowned architecture and planning theorist Christopher Alexander - famous for his "pattern language" - took his students from the University of California Berkeley to the site with the aim of reimagining it as something that would grow organically over time. The results were published in 1987 as the book A New Theory of Urban Design (1987).

== Seawall upgrade and enhancements projects ==
The Embarcadero seawall is over a century old, originally constructed between 1878 and 1916, and is in need of upgrades in order to ensure its integrity in the event of a major earthquake. As of February 2018 the Port of San Francisco, the San Francisco Municipal Transportation Agency, and several other departments are partnering to deliver a project to upgrade the seawall and adjoining public spaces. The project is expected to cost at least $2 billion, and the city successfully passed a ballot measure to issue $425 million in bonds to finance part of the project in November 2016.

== Gallery ==
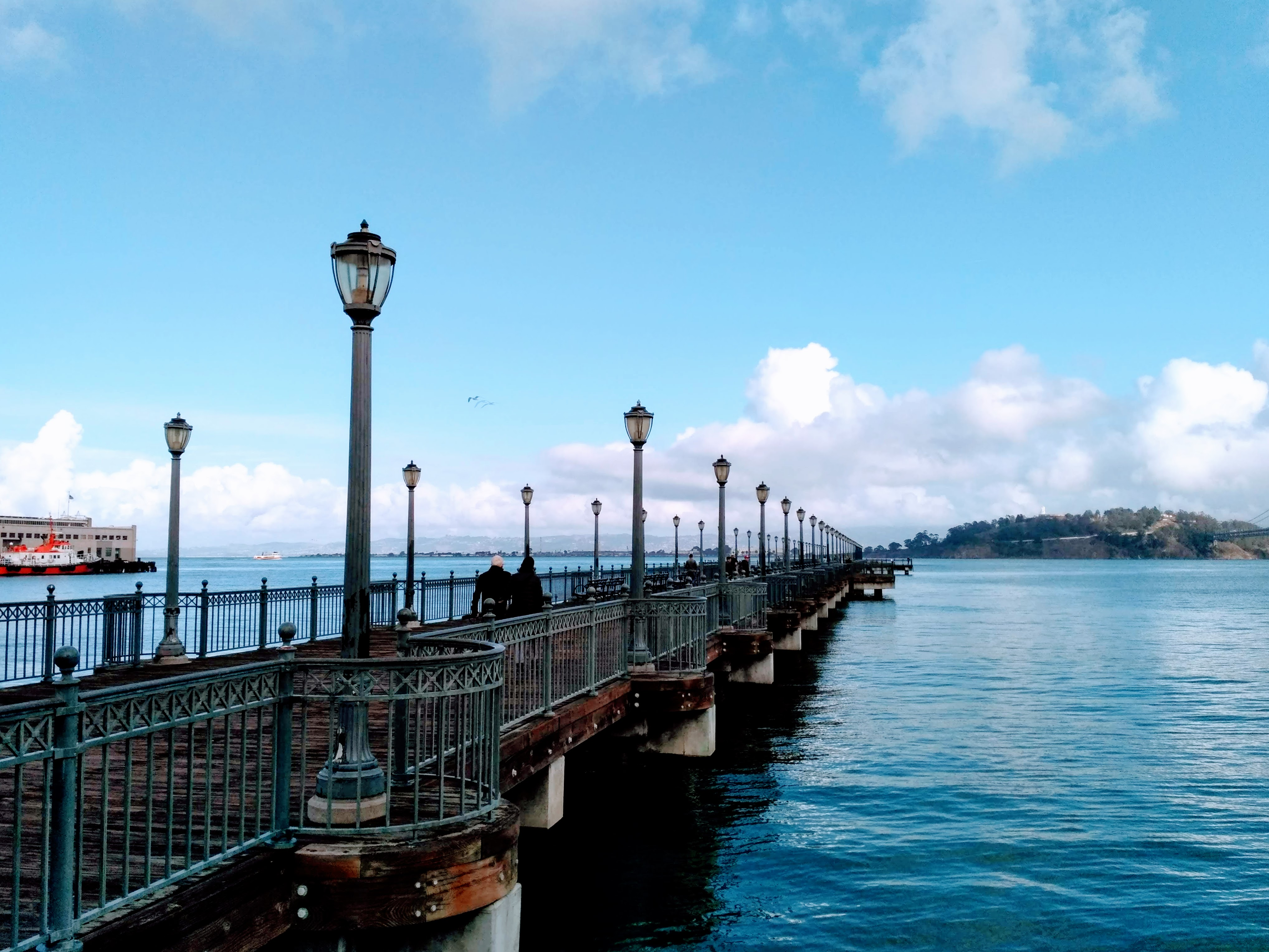
Pier 7, the Embarcadero, towards Yerba Beuna island

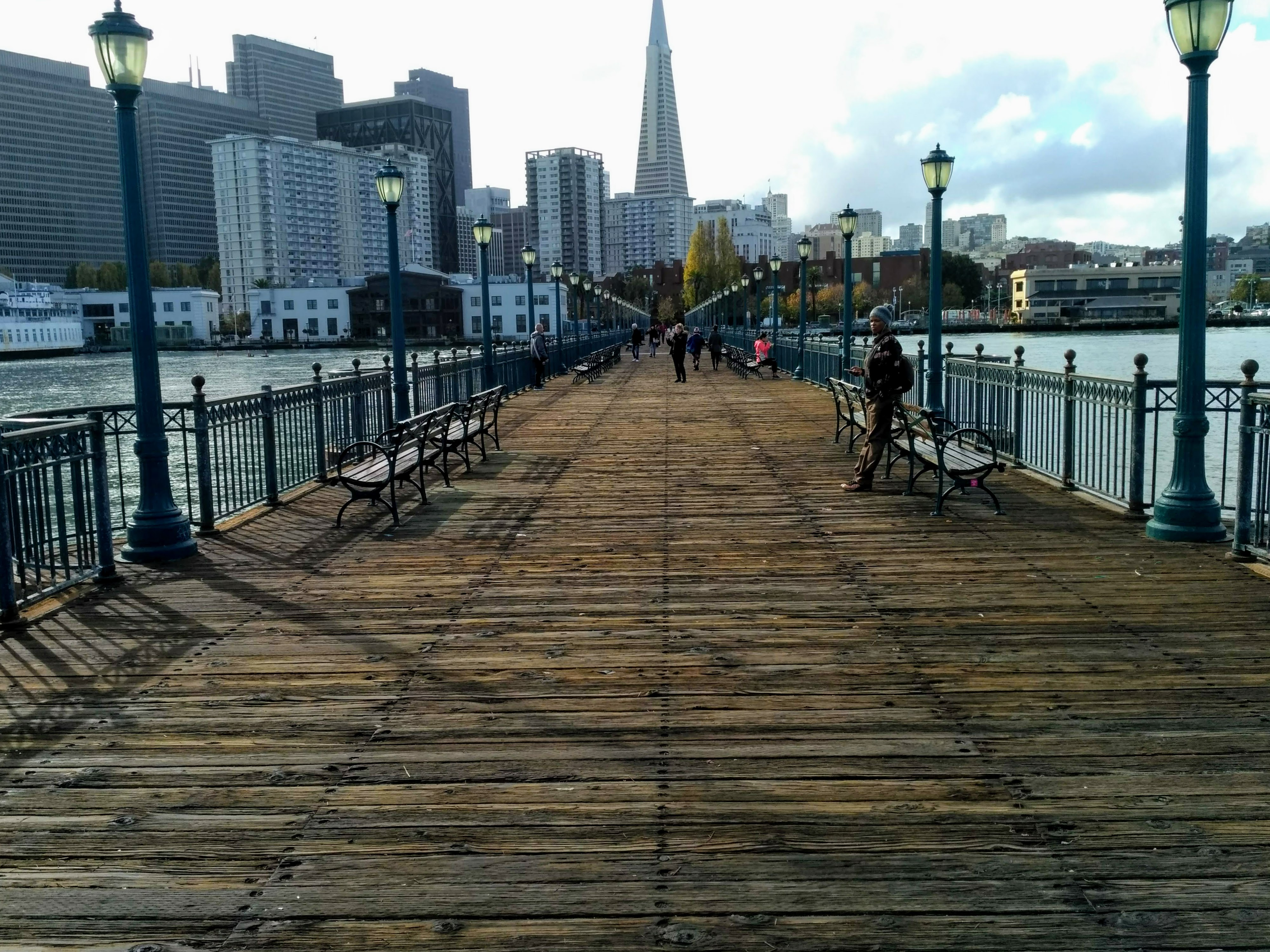
End of Pier 7, towards the Embarcadero and Transamerica Pyramid

== See also ==
- A Trip Down Market Street, a historic film showing the Embarcadero and Ferry Building in 1906
