= Youth Chance High School =

Alternative high school in San Francisco, California

Coordinates: 37°47′32.88″N 122°23′31.36″W

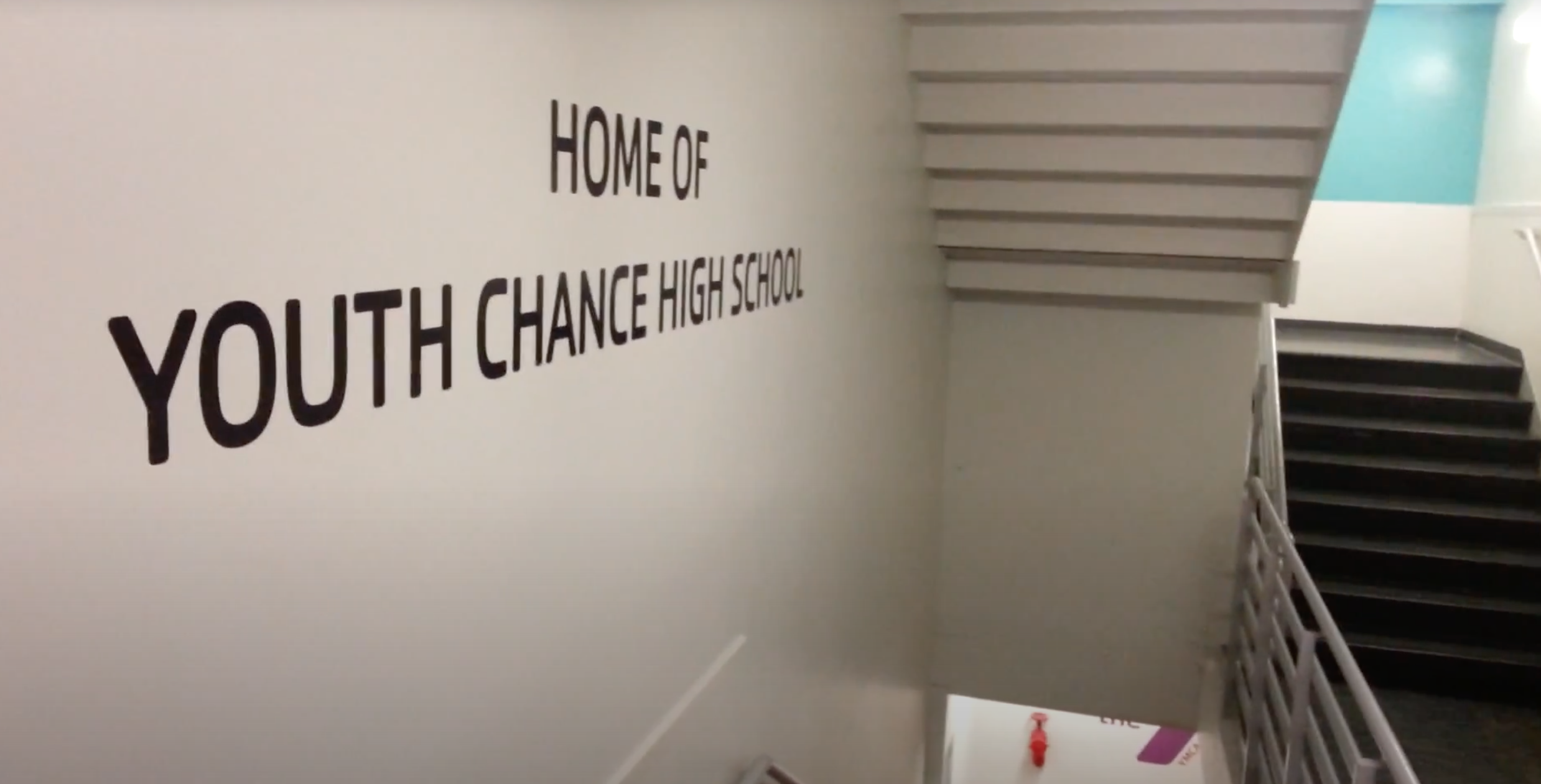
- San Francisco, California; United States

Information
- Established: 1977; 49 years ago
- Age: 15 to 19

Youth Chance, or YCHS, is a small alternative high school for "at-risk" youth in San Francisco, California. Its programs have been noted as reversing aversion to education and increasing self-esteem and outlook at minimal cost.

== History ==
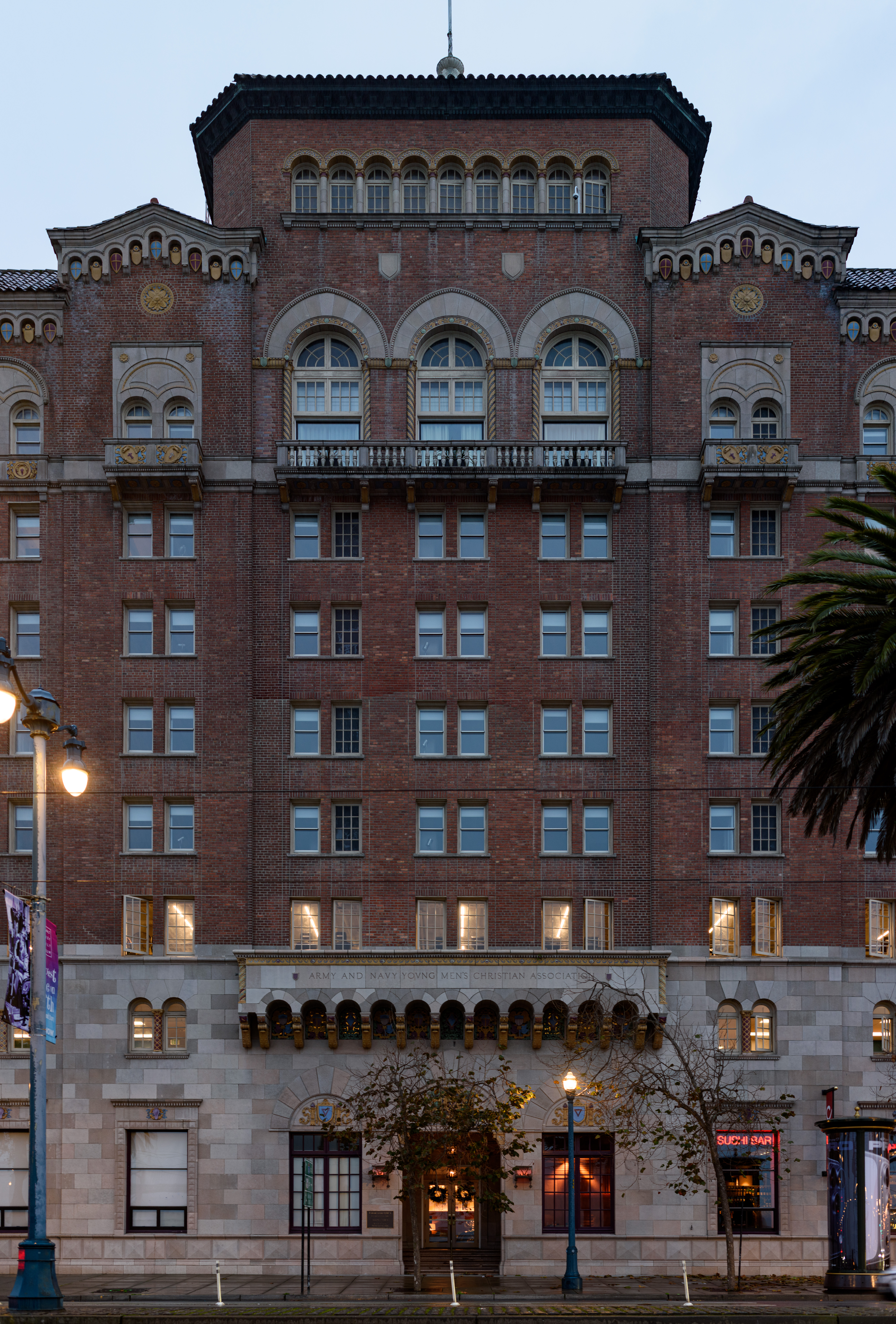
The front facade of the Embarcadero YMCA, which houses Youth Chance High School.

Youth Chance High School was founded in 1977 and is run and operated by the YMCA. The school accepts students aged 15 to 19 years old with a focus on students who have dropped out of other schools and who have subsequently been referred by social service agencies, family members or the students themselves.

The Embarcadero YMCA, which houses the school, occupies the former Army-Navy YMCA building at 169 Steuart Street, completed in 1926 and individually listed as an Article 11 historic resource.

In 1987 it was noted as an example of a "successful intervention program" by the federal Office of Vocational and Adult Education.

The school works with a diverse student population, preparing them with the necessary academic skills to pass the GED and/or CHSPE (California High School Equivalency Exam). 97% of the student body are students of color, and all of the students qualify for free or reduced lunch.
