= Yerba Buena Cove =

Historical cove on San Francisco Bay

Coordinates: 37°47′35″N 122°23′46″W

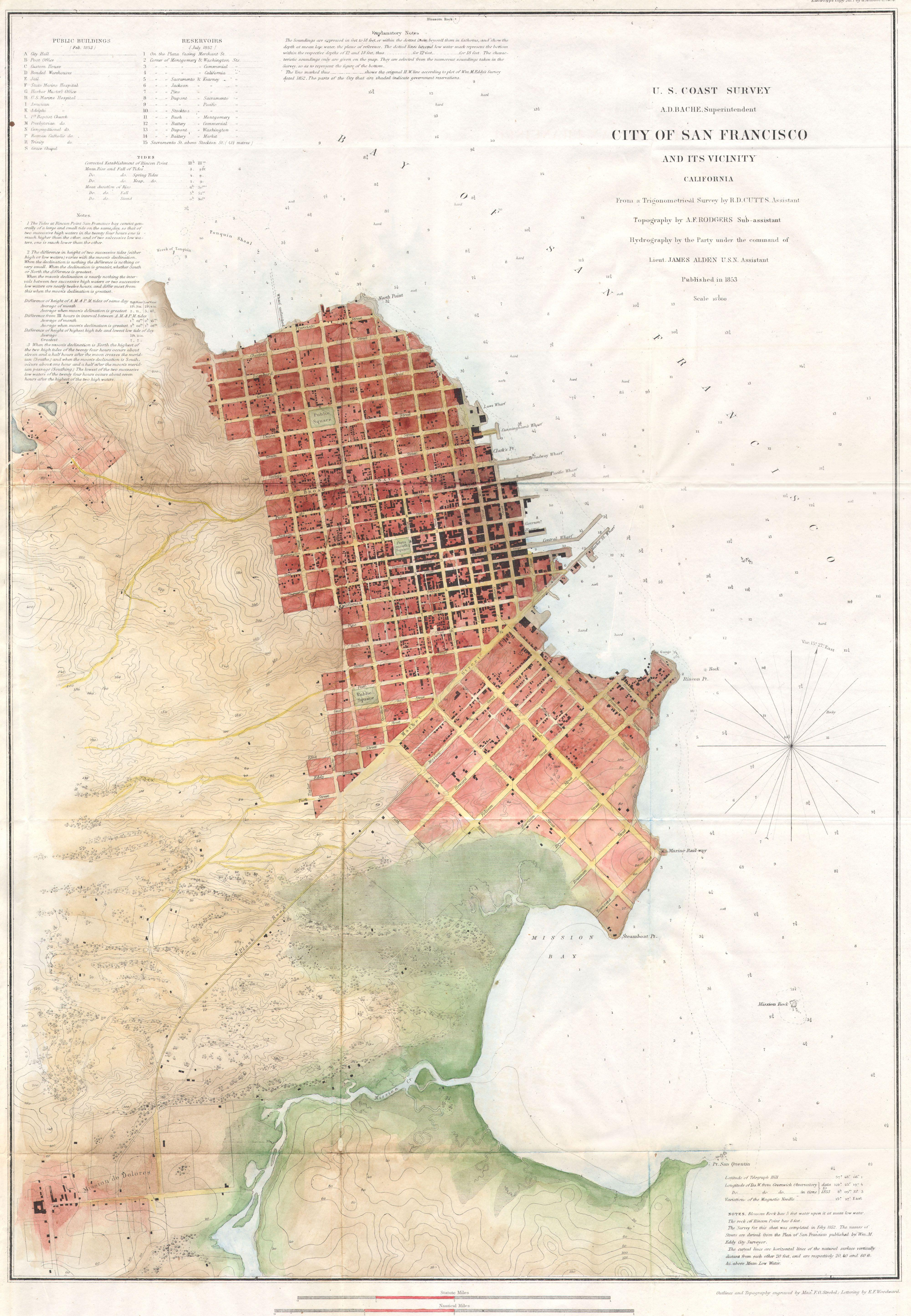
The Shoreline of San Francisco in 1853. Since 1849, Yerba Buena Cove has been filled in between Clarks Point and the Market Street Wharf. What remains was south of that wharf to Rincon Point.

Yerba Buena Cove was a cove on San Francisco Bay where the Mexican town of Yerba Buena was located. It lay between Clarks Point to the north (southeast of Telegraph Hill, near the corner of Broadway and Battery Streets) and Rincon Point to the south (near the corner of Harrison and Spear Streets). The beach of the cove was set as far back as what is now Montgomery Street between Clay and Washington Streets.

Between the beginning of the California Gold Rush and 1860, the cove was filled in, and the downtown of the city of San Francisco built over it. A number of ships were sunk in the cove, including some that were intentionally scuttled to allow the owners to claim the land around the sunken ship. Wrecks known to remain buried include the Apollo, the Niantic, and the Rome, the latter of which was discovered in 1994 during construction of the Muni Metro Turnback Tunnel.
