= Port of San Francisco =

Organization that oversees port facilities in San Francisco, California, United States

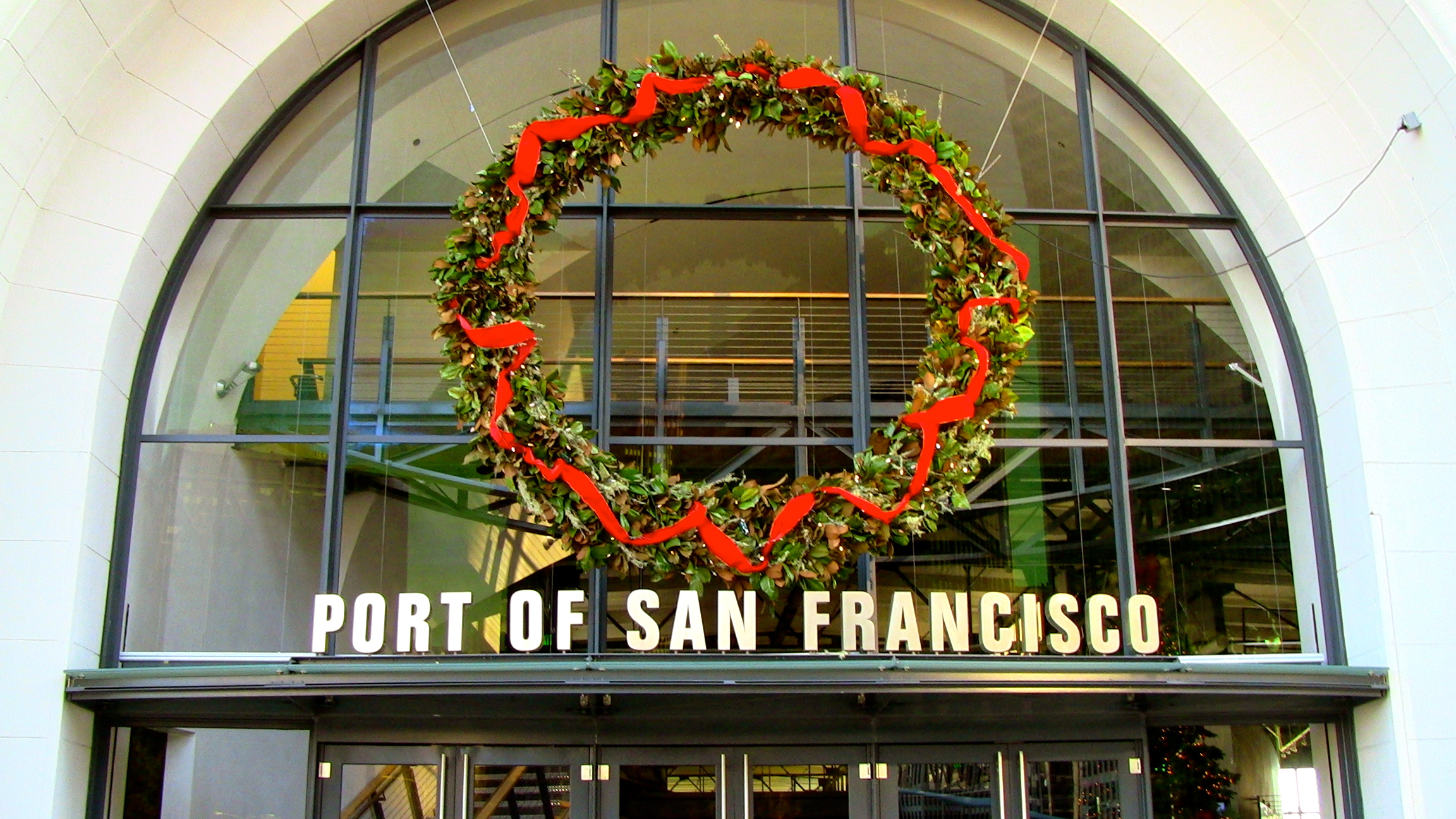
- Port Headquarters Pier 1

Agency overview
- Formed: 1957
- Preceding agency: Board of State Harbor Commissioners
- Jurisdiction: San Francisco
- Headquarters: Pier 1
- Agency executives: Doreen Woo Ho, Commission President; Elaine Forbes (October 2016 – December 2025), Executive Director
- Parent department: City and County of San Francisco
- Website: www.sfport.com

The Port of San Francisco is a semi-independent organization that oversees the port facilities at San Francisco, California, United States. It is run by a five-member commission, appointed by the mayor subject to confirmation by a majority of the San Francisco Board of Supervisors. The Port is responsible for managing the larger waterfront area that extends from the anchorage of the Golden Gate Bridge, along the Marina district, all the way around the north and east shores of the city of San Francisco including Fisherman's Wharf and the Embarcadero, and southward to the city line just beyond Candlestick Point. In 1969, the State of California, via the California State Lands Commission for the state-operated San Francisco Port Authority (est. 1957), transferred its responsibilities for the Harbor of San Francisco waterfront to the City and County of San Francisco/San Francisco Harbor Commission through the 1968 Burton Act AB2649. All eligible state port authority employees had the option to become employees of the City and County of San Francisco to maintain consistent operation of the port of San Francisco.

The port of San Francisco lies on the western edge of the San Francisco Bay near the Golden Gate. It has been called one of the three great natural harbors in the world, but it took two long centuries for navigators from Spain and England to find the anchorage originally called Yerba Buena: a port, as was said in its early days, in which all the fleets of the world could find anchorage.

The port area under the commission's control comprises nearly eight miles of waterfront lands, commercial real estate and maritime piers from Hyde Street on the north to India Basin in the southeast. The list of landmarks under port control include Fisherman's Wharf, Pier 39, the Ferry Building, Oracle Park (formerly AT&T Park, SBC Park and Pacific Bell Park), located next to China Basin and Pier 70 at Potrero Point. Huge covered piers on piles jut out into San Francisco Bay along much of the waterfront, bordered by the Embarcadero roadway. In 2015, the city, acting through the port of San Francisco, launched the San Francisco Seawall Earthquake Safety and Disaster Prevention Program (Seawall Program).

== History ==
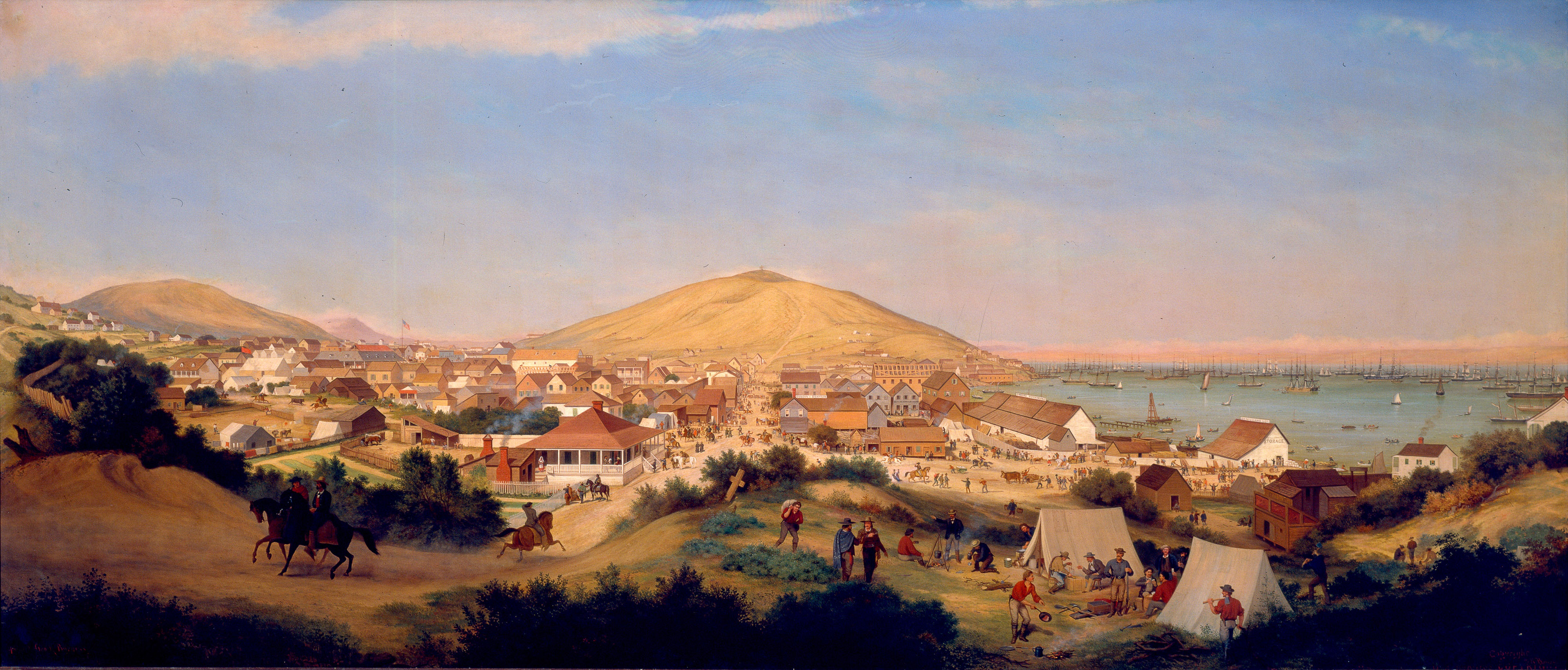
San Francisco in 1849

The first landing place on the north-eastern tip of the San Francisco peninsula was a rocky promontory below Telegraph Hill later known as Clarke's Point that jutted into the San Francisco Bay at the line of what is now Broadway and Battery Streets. Yerba Buena Cove swept inland from the subsequently named Clarke's Point to as far as Montgomery Street to the west, and further south and east to Rincon Point at the south of Market area at the foot of Folsom and Spear streets.

The founding padres of Mission Dolores and the other northern California missions found the jetty at Clarke's Point a convenient landing for their commerce in hides and tallow. It is the same location where Russian ships anchored to load supplies of meat and grain. Early European visitors were the British Raccoon in 1814 and the French frigate Artemise in 1839. The sloop USS St. Louis, which arrived in 1840, was the first warship to fly the American flag in San Francisco Bay. On July 9, 1846, the sloop USS Portsmouth gave a 21-gun salute and Captain John Berrien Montgomery and his detachment rowed ashore and hoisted the American flag on the Mexican flagpole in the small settlement's plaza, later named Portsmouth Square in honor of the ship.

The earliest development of a port in San Francisco, two and a half miles east of the Presidio, was under the Mexican regime, begun in 1835 as the town of Yerba Buena. Before this time, the port at Monterey was considered the official port of entry to California.

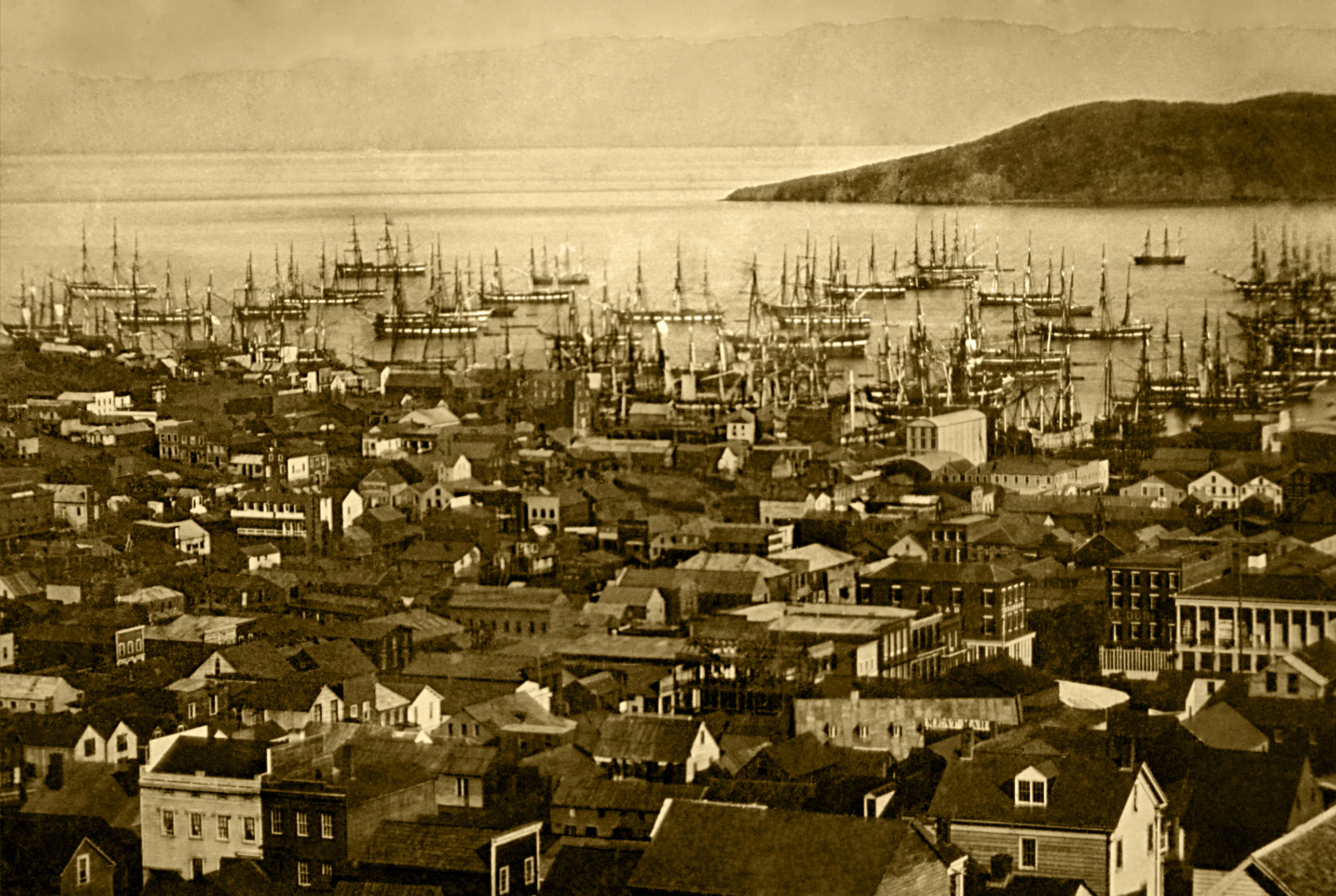
San Francisco Harbor in 1851

Captain Richardson erected the first abode of a European on the hill overlooking the Bay. He became the first harbor master by appointment of the Governor Mariano Guadaloupe de Vallejo. Whalers took umbrage at the taxes charged by the Mexican governor Manuel Micheltorena in 1843, and the outright banning of their trading in the port, then relocated from San Francisco to the Hawaiian Islands.

Commodore John D. Sloat claimed California for the United States on July 7, 1846, during the Mexican–American War, and Captain John B. Montgomery arrived to claim Yerba Buena two days later. In 1847, the first American alcalde, Lt. Washington Allon Bartlett changed the name from Yerba Buena to San Francisco, "so that the town may have the advantage of the name given on the public map".

The United States governor of the newly occupied territory of California, General Stephen W. Kearny, renounced the rights of eminent domain of the American government in favor of the city of San Francisco. The early city built up on the west side of Yerba Buena Cove around Portsmouth Square.

Immediately, the municipality of San Francisco was given the right, by General Kearney acting as governor of California, to sell "water lots" in the tidelands between Clarke's Point and Rincon Point so the city might gain revenues from the sale. At the same time, the owner of the land at the foot of Telegraph Hill, W. S. Clarke built a timbered wharf and the location became known as Clarke's Point. Later, a substantial wharf 750 feet (229 m) long and 60 feet (18 m) wide was erected to the depth of water, 26 feet (8 m), made the landing available to deep water ships. this project was followed by other wharves built below Broadway and Clay streets, and at Commercial street.

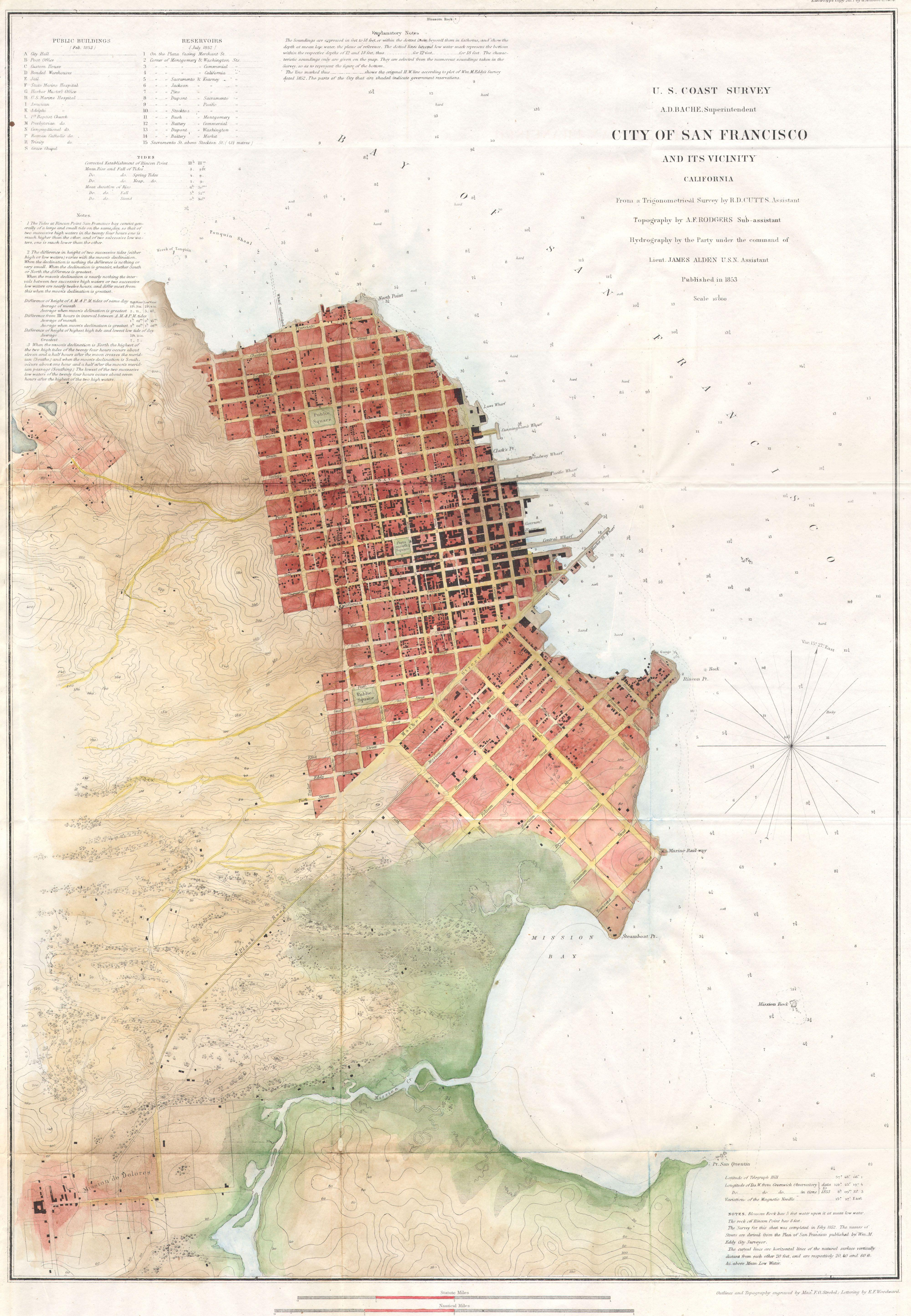
The Shoreline of San Francisco in 1853

When gold was discovered in California, the first hulk of an old iron revenue steamer, the James K. Polk, was beached at the foot of the bluff near Clarke's Point and became the foundation of the first real passenger landing in the city. It was at this site that the population of San Francisco met the Pacific mail liner the Oregon to receive the official announcement that California had been admitted to the Union. The bluff at the point was quickly leveled and on the land created a wharf was built that became the first regular berthing place, for a short time, for the Pacific mail steamships. Whatever products came to California, and whatever California produced, had to be carried by ship. In the first year of the gold rush, hundreds of ships were beached and abandoned in the tidal flats of Yerba Buena Cove, and numerous ships were run aground to become parts of the city itself. In 1853, the Vallejo Street wharf lease was granted, and a larger wharf was built.

In the ensuing years, the state legislature passed bills concerning the sale of water lots and authorizing the city to construct wharves beyond its boundary and to set wharfage rates. The battles over control of the waterfront, water lots, and docking privileges began. The great Central Wharf was built in 1849, named for the central wharf in Boston, and was located where Commercial street is now. Eventually a huge forest of masts from a fleet of abandoned vessels filled Yerba Buena Cove. By 1851, the Central Wharf had ten times more business offered than it could handle, and many new wharves were struck into the bay, including those at Market, Sacramento, Washington, California, Clay, Jackson and Pacific Streets. The filling of Yerba Buena Cove and extensive corruption and legislation led to a period, during the gold rush, when major portions of the city were built on water lots, reclaimed by hook or by crook, on pile driven and rough planking overlain. Early San Francisco was a wharf city of planks and sheds and subject to devastating fires. Half the early city was built on trembling wharves and the scrub and sandy hills were not appreciated, amongst them only a few abodes and scattered tents were found. The early wharves and their buildings fell into the bay and by 1857, the waterfront was a jumble of abandoned ships and rickety piers. Businesses looked for more solid facilities.

Two wharves of notice projected out into the bay from the foot of Taylor street: McMahon's Wharf, and Meiggs Wharf. They had T- and L-shaped extensions; the former was a landing for wood and charcoal. The latter, after Harry Meiggs absconded, became the landing for the ferry to Sausalito.

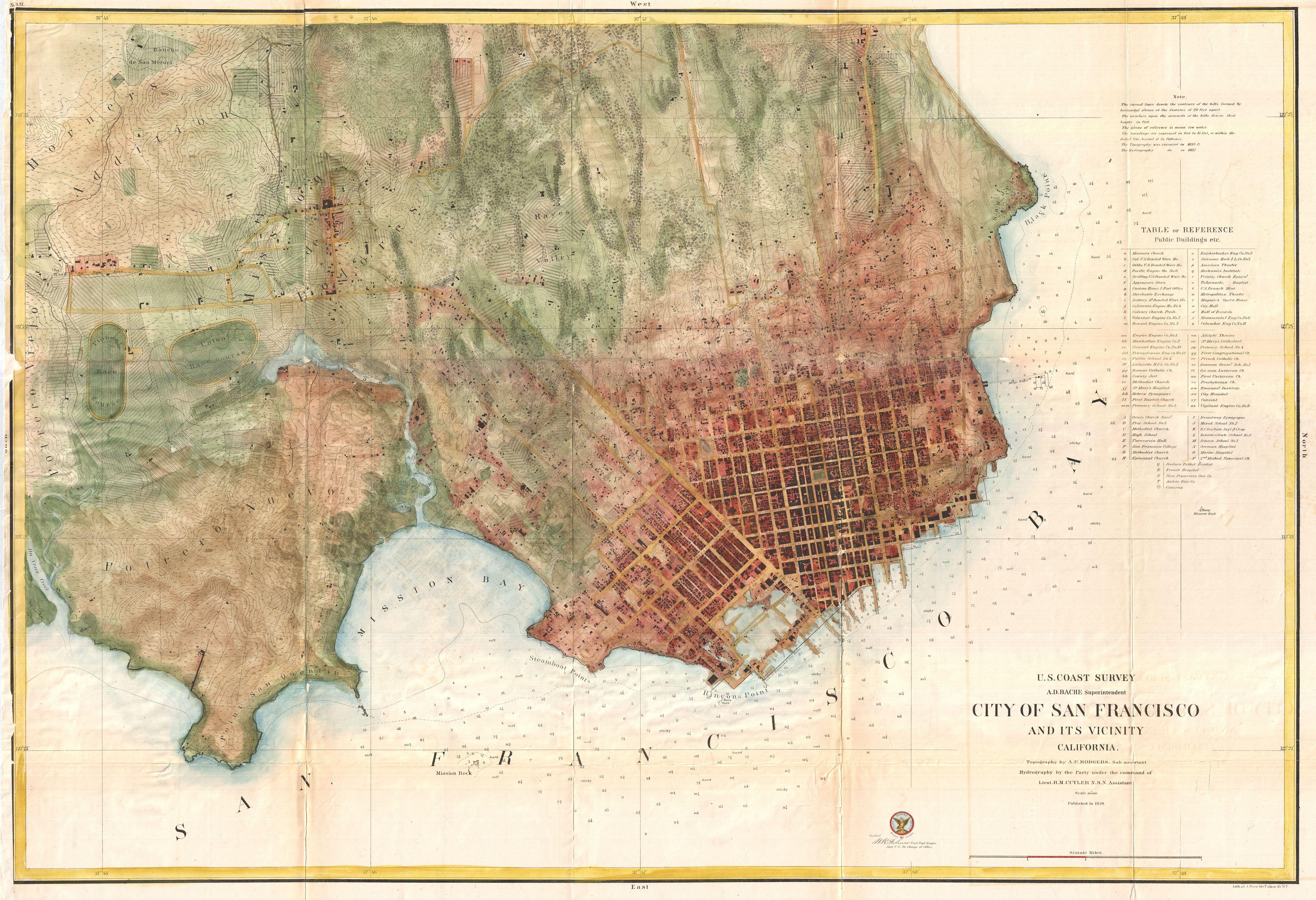
Map of San Francisco in 1858

Merchant's (or Cousin's) Dock built and repaired ships at the site that is now Kearney and Bay streets. It was swallowed up when a new location for the Seawall was established along the cure that is now the Embarcadero. Merchant's Drydock was moved to the foot of Harrison and the company established floating drydocks at Hunter's Point. The North Point dock at the north side of Telegraph Hill was built in 1853 and became the landing site for immigrant ships from Italy and France. Numerous other wharves, privately built and owned, stretched along the northern waterfront; Flint's, the India docks, Cowell's, Shaw's, Law's, Buckelew's, Cunnigham's and the Long Wharf. Many of these wharves were on city lands that might be filled at any time, and most disappeared with the building of the Seawall and the modern piers built into the early 20th century. Amidst intense disputation over ownership and litigation unparalleled in the history of any port in the world, the establishment of the Board of State Harbor commissioners created a San Francisco waterfront as a separate institution by law, having no connection to the city government and indirectly controlled by the state.

Until the 1860s, supplies could also be delivered up Mission Creek by boat to the vicinity of Mission Dolores.

=== California Board of State Harbor Commissioners ===
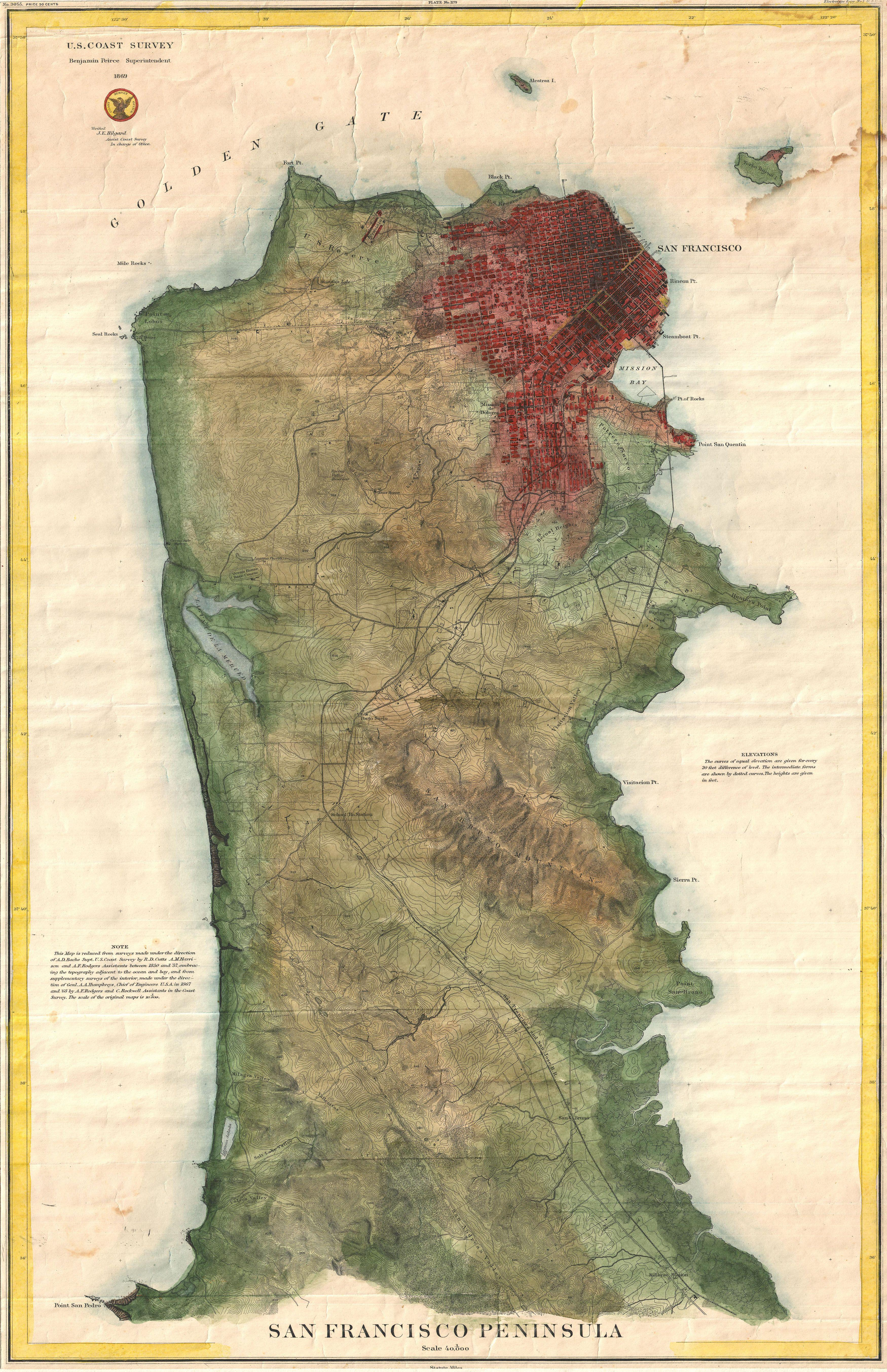
Shoreline of San Francisco in 1869

Chapter 306 of the Statutes of 1863 created the California Board of State Harbor Commissioners and set about the task of building a Seawall on the San Francisco waterfront. The project that would eliminate the patchwork and jagged lines of the waterfront, ending it cleanly at the modern Embarcadero. After four years of litigation, the commissioners offered a thousand dollar prize for the best plan for the San Francisco Seawall. One of the designers of the plan, W.J. Lewis was appointed engineer in chief of the project. Another engineer on the project, T.J. Arnold designed the curving waterfront eventually settled on.

A 60-foot-wide (18 m) pit or channel in the mudflats was dredged to a depth of 20 feet (6.1 m) below low tide level and huge loads of rock were placed from watercraft at the center line of the trench until they stopped sinking, to make an evenly graded ridge the whole way at the height of mean low tide. The rocks became the foundation for the Seawall. Coffer dams were sunk and forms constructed inside them while constant pumping occurred. A mass of concrete 2 feet (0.61 m) thick and 10 feet (3.0 m) wide was poured over the rocks and a masonry wall seven feet at the base and nine feet high was constructed. The area inside the wall was pumped out and filled with rock, rubble and trash to the city grade. It took the board several years to acquire the leases on private wharves.

The opening of the First transcontinental railroad in 1869 halted harbor development and the building of the Seawall. The tonnage of vessels arriving at the port dropped by nearly half in the next two years. By 1871, the commissioners could report that they were in possession of all the wharves along the city front except those that bordered Channel Street between Third and Fourth streets. In 1881, the harbor commissioners began contracting for the construction of the San Francisco Seawall. The Seawall took 50 years before completion of the last sections in the China Basin. Chapter 835 of the Statutes of 1929 created the State operated San Francisco Harbor Bond Finance Board. The 1929 act provided for the issuance and sale of state bonds to create a fund for the improvement of San Francisco Harbor by the California Board of State Harbor Commissioners. Chapter 368 of the Statutes of 1937 changed the name of the commission to the California Board of State Harbor Commissioners for San Francisco Harbor. Chapter 112 of the Statutes of 1957 renamed the commission yet again as the San Francisco Port Authority which still remained under State authority/jurisdiction. Chapter 1333 of the Statutes of 1968 transferred all authority, jurisdiction and control of the San Francisco Port Authority over San Francisco Harbor and facilities to the City and County of San Francisco. Upon the transfer of these authorities, the port authority ceased to function and was dissolved. The newly created Harbor Commission of the City and County of San Francisco assumed responsibility and control. Eventually this commission was renamed, yet again, Port Commission of the City and County of San Francisco which oversees the Port of San Francisco to this day.

=== Filling the downtown district ===
Steam powered machines called "paddies" were eating away at the sand dunes and rock hills, especially Telegraph Hill, a few blocks west of the filled zone. Rock was also imported from Brooks Island off Point Richmond. Temporary steam train lines carried the earthen fill for dumping onto the mudflats. Both the Ferry Building and the Southern Pacific Building at the foot of Market Street were built upon thousands of Douglas-fir piles, up to 135 feet (41 m) deep.

=== Belt Railroad ===
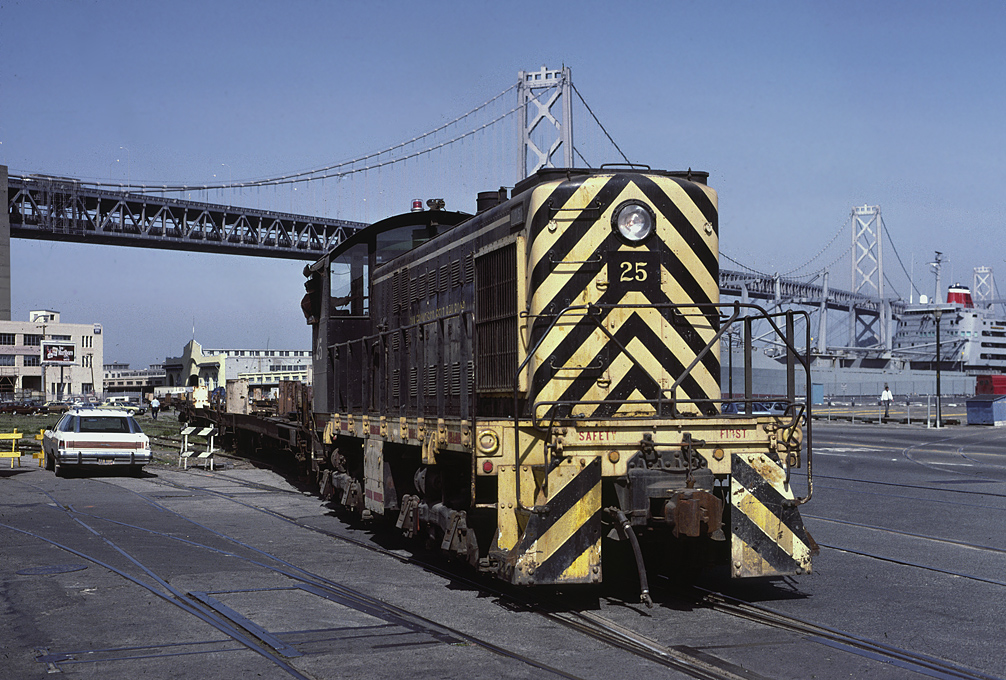
Belt Railroad #25 south of the Bay Bridge in 1985

In 1890 the port commissioners began developing a series of switchyards and warehouses on the reclaimed land for use of the San Francisco Belt Railroad, a line of over 50 miles that connected every berth and every pier with the industrial parts of the city and railways of America with all the trade routes of the Pacific. For a decade or more, railcar ferry transfers on steamers were the means of carrying railcars to the transcontinental systems. In 1912, the belt line was driven across Market Street in front of the Ferry Building to link the entire commercial waterfront with railways both south and north and across the continent. The line was extended north along Jefferson Street through the tunnel to link up with U.S. Transport Docks at Fort Mason and south to China Basin.

Much of the Belt Railroad's right-of-way was removed following the 1989 Loma Prieta earthquake and replaced with streetcar tracks now used by the San Francisco Municipal Railway. The Belt Railroad Engine House and Sandhouse was added to the National Register of Historic Places on February 13, 1986.

=== Embarcadero ===
The Embarcadero (Spanish: Wharf) is the eastern waterfront and roadway of the port of San Francisco constructed atop an engineered Seawall on reclaimed land. San Francisco's shoreline historically ran south and inland from Clarke's Point below Telegraph Hill to present-day Montgomery Street and eastward toward Rincon Point, enclosing a cove named Yerba Buena Cove. As the city grew, the cove was filled. Over 50 years a large offshore Seawall was built and the mudflats filled, creating what today is San Francisco's Financial District. The roadway follows the Seawall, a boundary first established in the 1860s and not completed until the 1920s. It was added to the National Register of Historic Places on November 20, 2002.

=== History of the Embarcadero Seawall ===
Constructed between 1879 and 1916, the Embarcadero Seawall was built by dredging a trench through the mud, filling that trench with rock and rubble, covering the filled land with a timber pile bulkhead wall and wharf, then filling the tidal marshland area behind the Seawall. More than 500 acres of land were filled behind the Seawall, thus extending the footprint of the city. The Seawall acts as a retaining wall for the filled land behind it. The Seawall is the foundation of the Embarcadero Historic District, which includes the bulkhead buildings and finger piers that extend into the Bay.

After the Seawall was built, in 1900 alone, six million tons of goods passed through the port of San Francisco. To support the demand, the Port constructed new piers – by 1908, 23 new piers were built. In 1922, with the new Seawall and piers in place, 14.5 million tons of goods passed through the port of San Francisco.

In 1898, the Ferry Building was built and served as the headquarters for the Harbor Commission.

== Modern developments ==
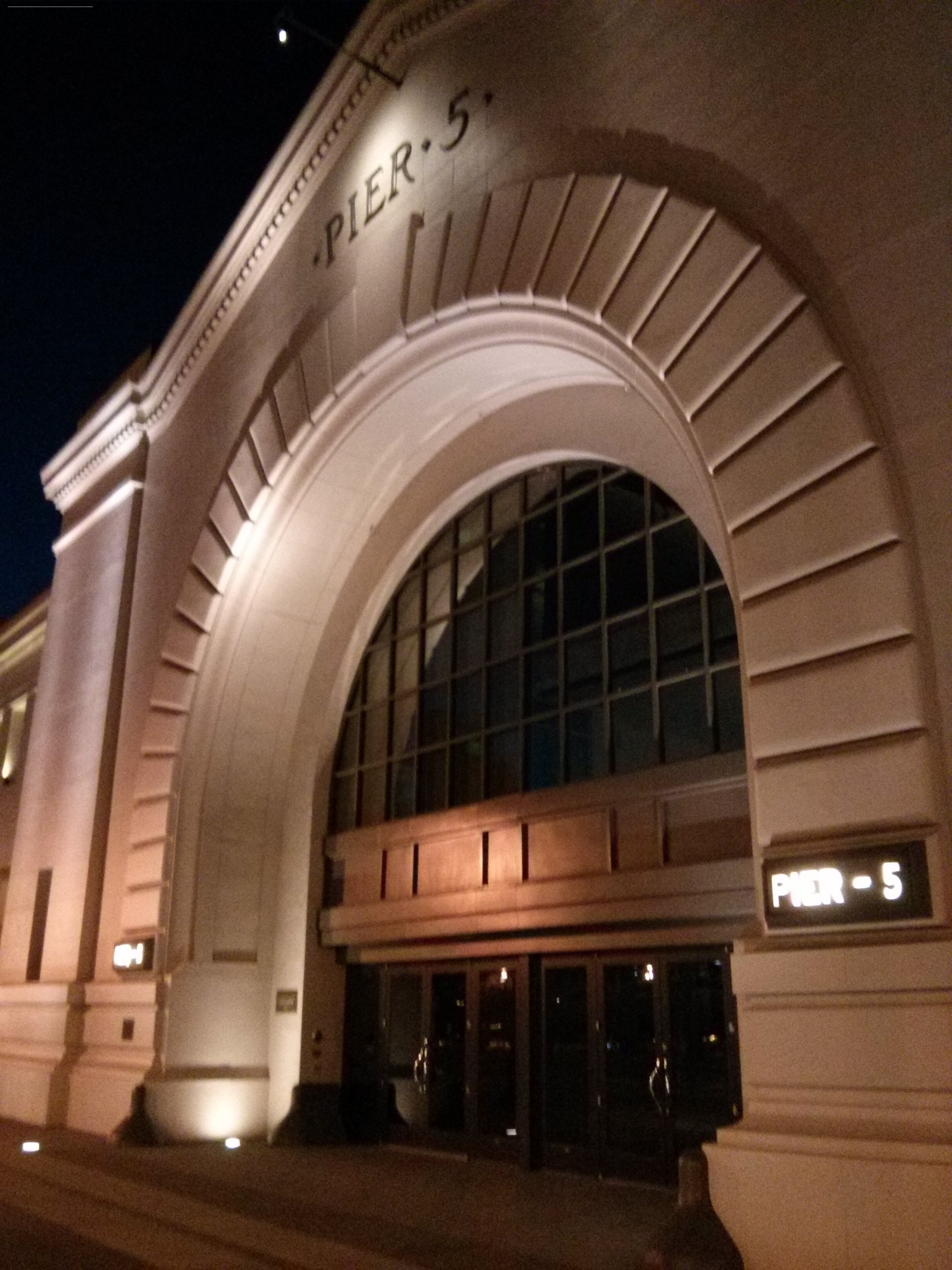
Pier 5 was renovated and converted to commercial use in 2005

According to port historian Edward Morphy, the achievement of building a great port, "was rendered possible solely by the fact that its harbor commissioners, through the succeeding of generations, not only had behind them the credit of the state of California but also were in a position to rise superior to the narrow influences of local politics... The development of the waterfront itself, the Embarcadero, the Seawall and piers, the Belt Railroad and the Seawall lots, could not have been carried out under private or municipal auspices in the manner so beneficial, so efficient, and so economical as is now apparent".

With the fire after the 1906 earthquake, a new era of port development began on the San Francisco waterfront. In 1909, the San Francisco Harbor Improvement Act was passed. A total of $9 million was allocated by the state legislature and in 1913, Islais Creek and India Basin lands were purchased. The Board of State Harbor Commissioners began extensive development along the waterfront, always meeting expenses from the revenues of the busy port.

Upon completion of the modern piers, odd-numbered to the north of the Ferry Building and even-numbered to the south, the port of San Francisco became the only port in the United States under a single control. The piers were leased to tenants. By the early 1920s, the port's assets were valued at $50 million and $8 to $9 million worth of merchandise and raw goods were handled yearly.

In the 1920s and 1930s, numerous old piers on both sides of Market Street were razed and a smaller number of concrete piers with wider slips between them were constructed. The port also built the six-story China Basin Warehouse to bring together ships, rail, and truck for the handling of products. At India Basin, it built a plant to handle vegetable oils.

The federal government in 1922 began dredging a 40-foot channel through the Bay's outer bar in at the entrance to the harbor after 1922 and the dredging of Islais Creek with the so-called reclamation of 30 acres (120,000 m^{2}) of adjacent creek tidelands.

Two graving docks at Hunter's Point that could accommodate the largest ocean-going vessels, five floating drydocks, eight marine railways, four shearleg derricks and ten floating boom derricks were available.

In the 1920s, the emergence of Los Angeles as the West Coast's largest city—and in particular, as its major industrial center—relegated the port of San Francisco to a secondary role. For the next few decades, the port steadily but inexorably lost market share to the twins ports of Los Angeles and Long Beach, as well as its crossbay rival Port of Oakland. The advent of containerization in the 1960s effectively sounded the death knell for the port of San Francisco as a major marine terminal, as it had no room to expand to build a large new container handling facility like the Seventh Street Terminal at the Port of Oakland. A few piers added container handling equipment, but heavy traffic congestion in the area and poor rail access have long militated against the large-scale development of the container trade at the port. Insufficient clearances of rail tunnels and overpasses have also prevented the development of roll-on/roll-off capability at the port. With limited ability to expand physically as a result of environmentalist opposition to further reclamation and the soaring cost of real estate in San Francisco, the port of San Francisco has instead become a niche player, specializing in break bulk and dry bulk cargo, ship repair, and ferry services.

=== Cargo terminals ===
With the advent of containerization and San Francisco's limited real estate, Oakland became the primary Bay Area port in the 1960s. The finger piers located along the northern waterfront quickly became outdated. San Francisco made an attempt to retain cargo capabilities by building new facilities in the southeast corner of the city. San Francisco's limited cargo facilities are located at Pier 80 (37.750°N 122.379°W, leased to the Pasha Group), 92, 94, and 96.

=== Ship repair ===
The drydock located at Pier 70 offers full service ship repair. BAE Systems Ship Repair manages San Francisco's ship repair facility.

=== Fisherman's Wharf ===
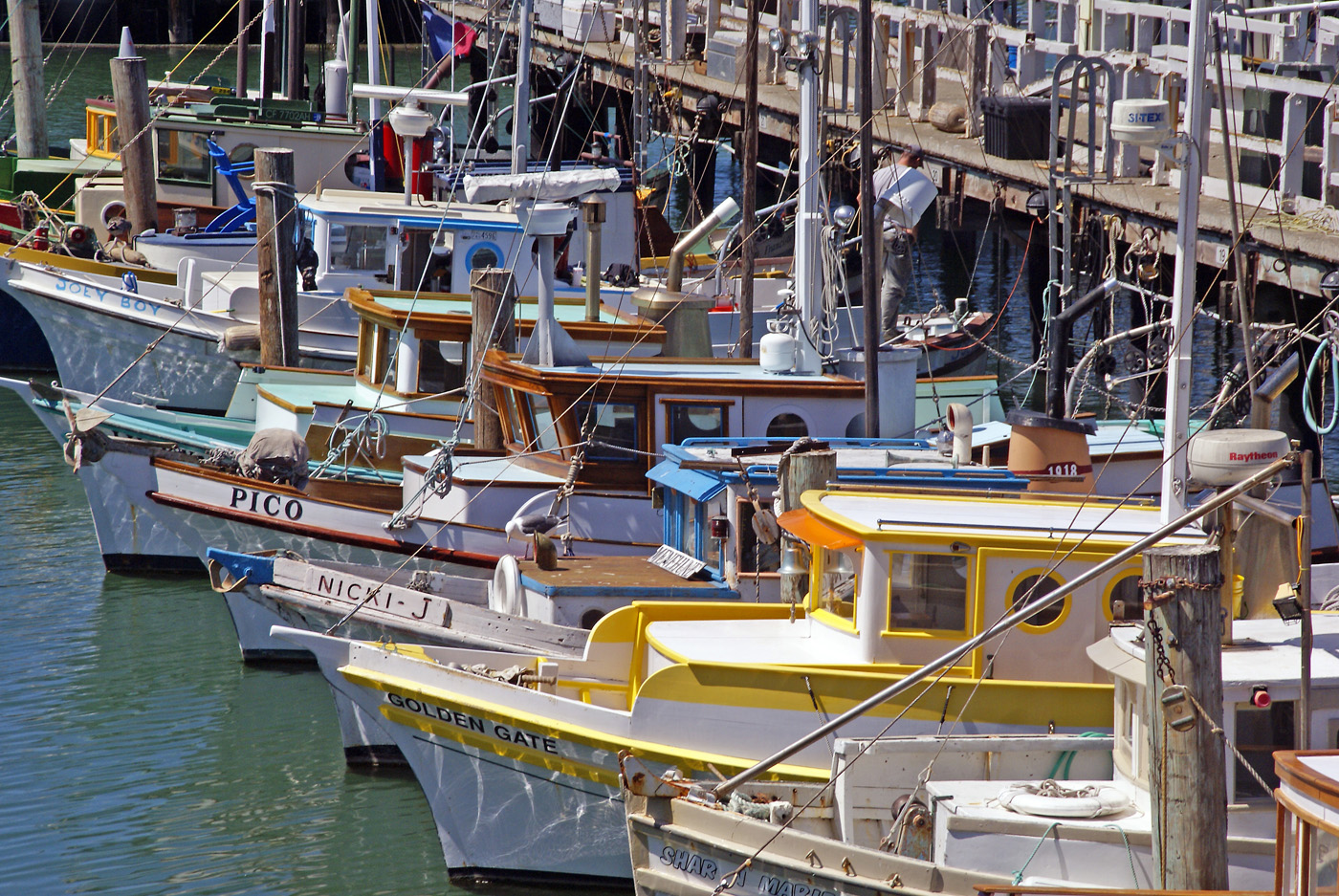
Fisherman's Wharf in 2009

San Francisco's Fisherman's Wharf gets its name and neighborhood characteristics from the city's early days of the mid to later 1800s when Italian immigrant fishermen came to the city by the bay to take advantage of the influx of population due to the gold rush. One in particular, Achille Paladini found it so lucrative he made a fortune wholesaling the local crustaceans and went on to become California's second most wealthy Italian, second to none other than the founder of the Bank of Italy, later to become the Bank of America. He was also a pioneer in developing the fish industry on the west coast and went on to be known as the "Fish King". Most of the Italian immigrant fishermen settled in the North Beach area close to the wharf and fished for the local delicacies and the now famed Dungeness crab. From then until the present day it remained the home base of San Francisco's fishing fleet. Despite its redevelopment into a tourist attraction during the 1970s and 1980s, the area is still home to many active fishermen and their fleets.

One of the busiest and well known tourist attractions in the western United States, Fisherman's Wharf is best known for being the location of Pier 39, the San Francisco Maritime National Historical Park and its adjacent museum, the Cannery Shopping Center, Ghirardelli Square, a Ripley's Believe It or Not! museum, the Musée Mécanique, the Wax Museum at Fisherman's Wharf, the floating Forbes Island restaurant, and restaurants and stands that serve fresh seafood, most notably Dungeness crab and clam chowder served in a sourdough bread bowl.

=== Pier 39 ===
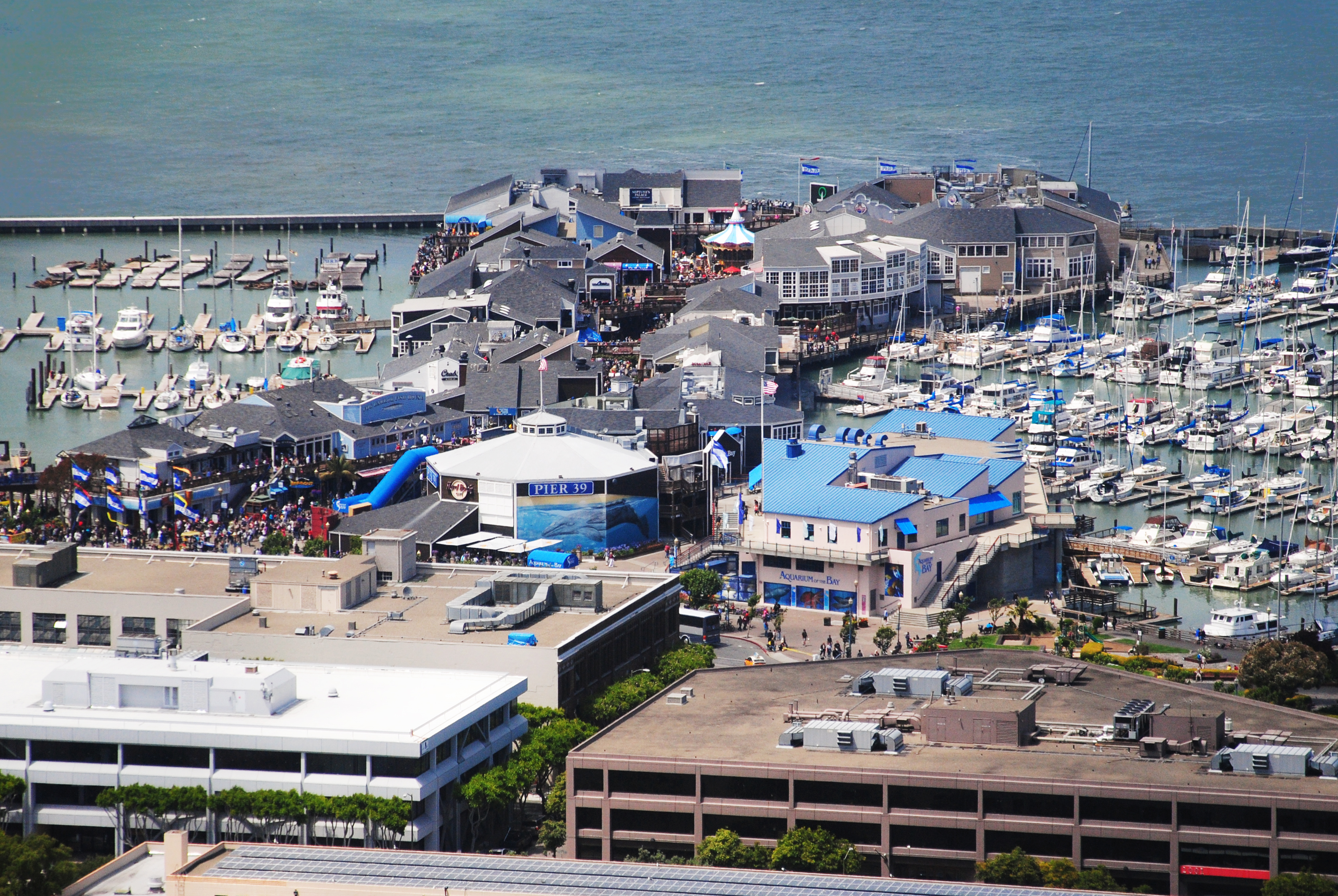
View of Pier 39

Pier 39 was first developed by entrepreneur Warren Simmons and opened October 4, 1978. Pier 39 is a shopping center and popular tourist attraction built on a pier in San Francisco, California. There are shops, restaurants, a video arcade, street performances, an interpretive center for the Marine Mammal Center, the Aquarium of the Bay, virtual 3D rides, and views of California sea lions hauled out on docks on Pier 39's marina. The marina is also home to the floating Forbes Island restaurant. A two-story carousel is one of the pier's more dominant features, although it is not directly visible from the street and sits towards the end of the pier.

=== Ferry Building ===
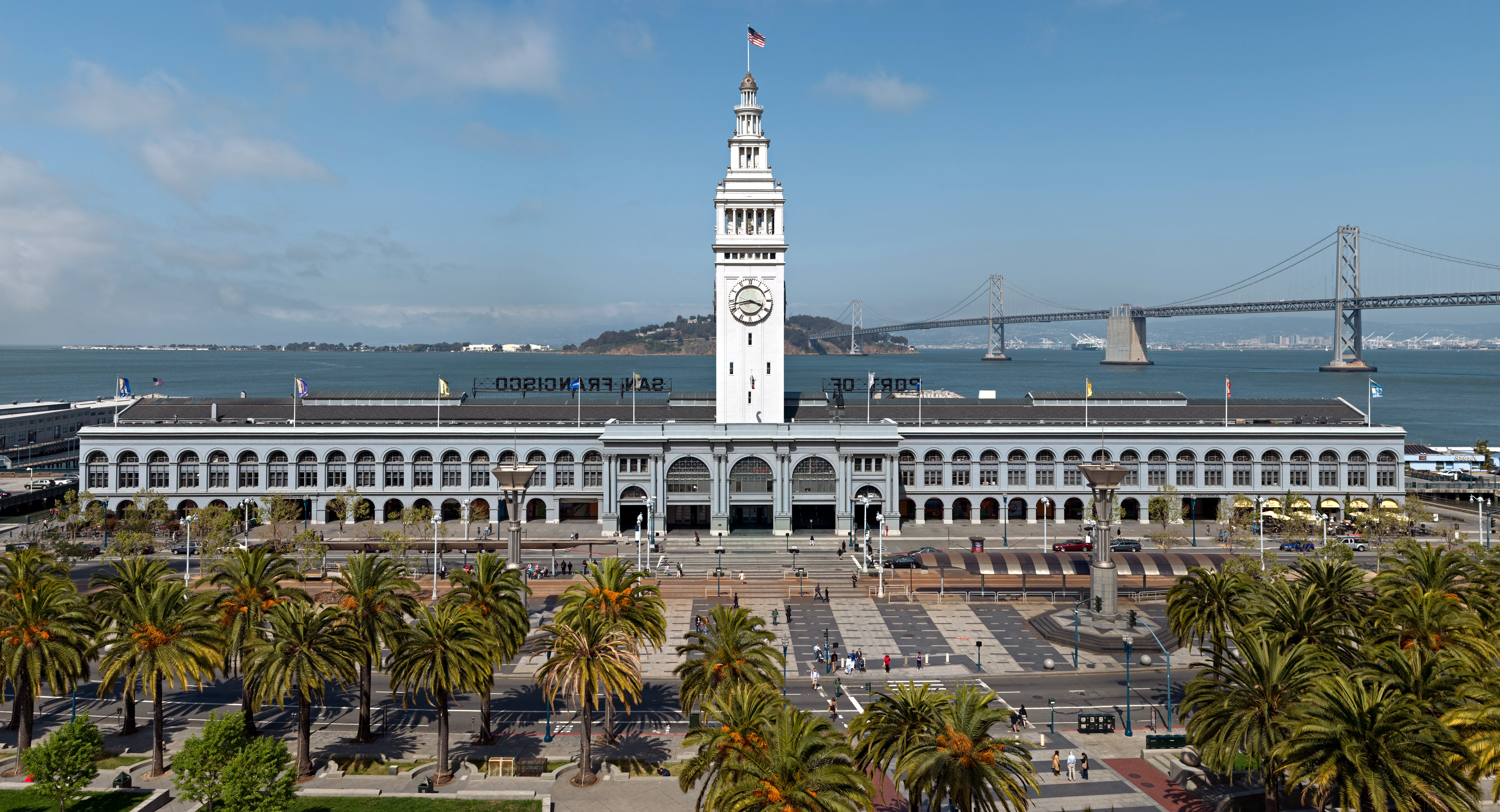
The Ferry Building was renovated in 2003

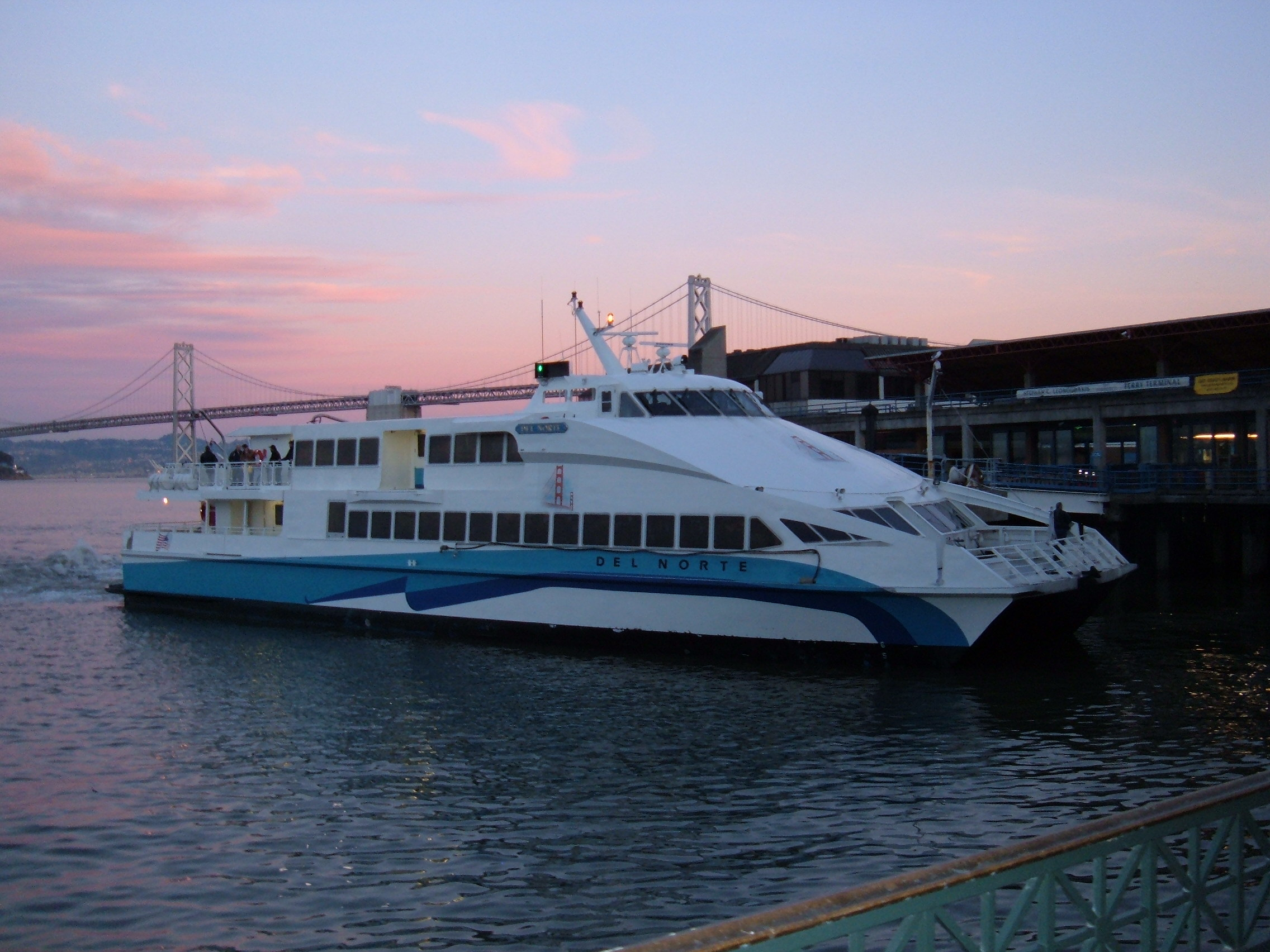
The Golden Gate Ferry M/V Del Norte docked at the Ferry Building

The San Francisco Ferry Building was built by the Harbor Commission for less than one million dollars and quickly became one of the most profitable investments in state history. It survived the 1906 earthquake with little damage. In the 1920s, 50 million passengers a year and a great number of automobiles used the ferries. On either side of the ferry slips, bay and river steamers arrived and departed with passengers and produce to and from the Sacramento and San Joaquin Valleys. Beyond were wharves for regular coastal steamers bound for Los Angeles, Portland, Seattle, British Columbia, Alaska, and ships bound for Hawaii, Central and South America and the Pacific Rim.

In 2003, the building reopened after the restoration of major public spaces, as well as renovations for new uses: it has a re-dedicated ferry terminal, an upscale gourmet marketplace in the former baggage area featuring local goods, and upper floors adapted for office use. San Francisco Bay Ferry operates from the Ferry Building and Pier 39 to points in Oakland, Alameda, Bay Farm Island, South San Francisco, and north to Vallejo in Solano County. Golden Gate Ferry is the other ferry operator with service between San Francisco and Marin County.

=== Central Embarcadero Piers Historic District ===
The Central Embarcadero Piers Historic District is a Registered Historic District, consisting of Piers 1, 1 1/2, 3 and 5, and is one of the largest surviving pier complexes along San Francisco's Embarcadero. It was added to the National Register of Historic Places on November 20, 2002.

=== Historic streetcars ===
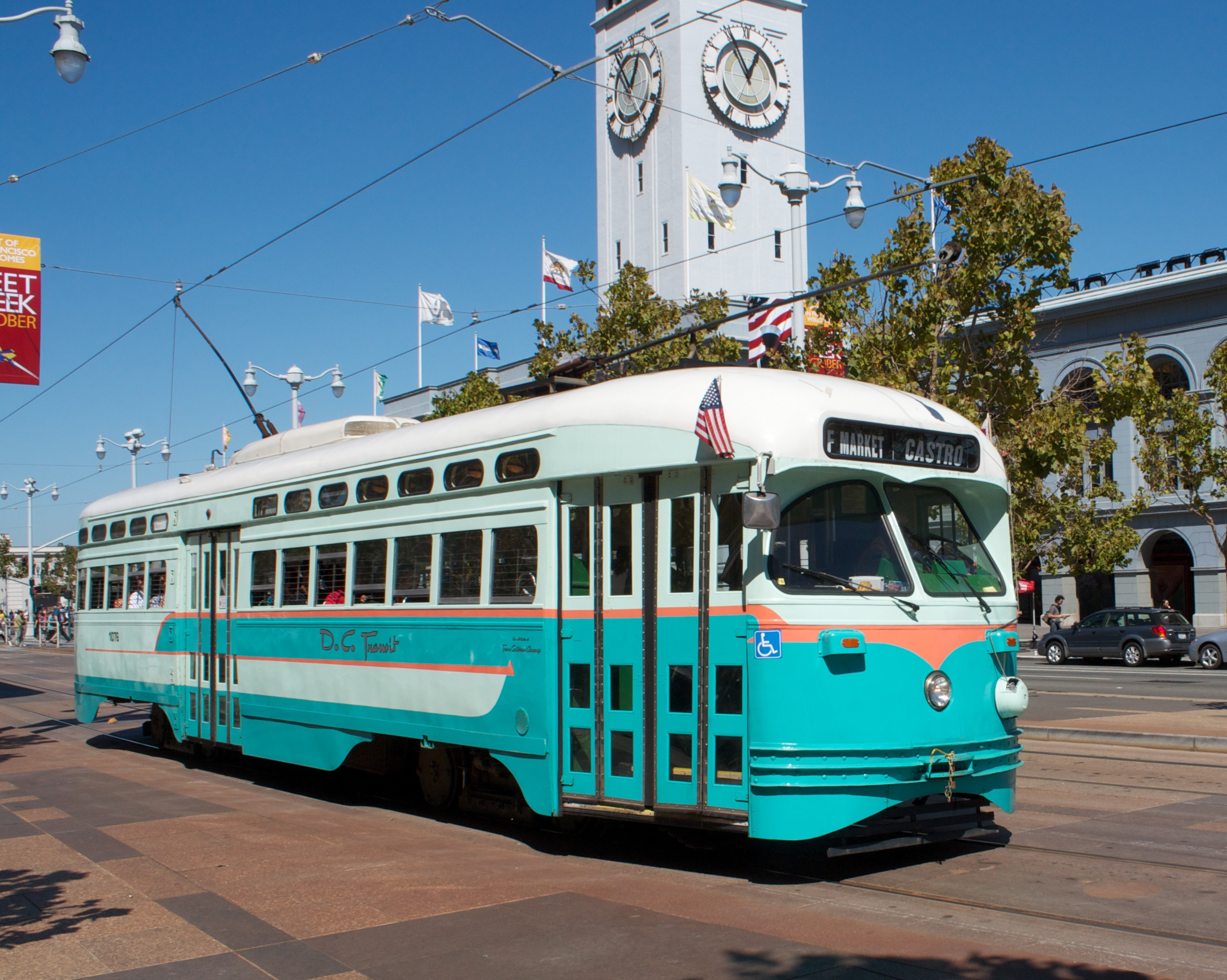
PCC #1076 in front of the Ferry Building

The F Market & Wharves line is operated as a heritage streetcar service, using exclusively historic equipment both from San Francisco's retired fleet as well as from cities around the world. In March 2000, service on the F line began along the new extension to Fisherman's Wharf.

The E Embarcadero became San Francisco's second heritage streetcar line in 2016. The line runs along the entire length of the Embarcadero, along existing track used by the F Market & Wharves historic streetcar and the N Judah and T Third Street Muni Metro lines. Initial service will run from Jones Street and Jefferson Street in Fisherman's Wharf to the Caltrain station. The line will be extended west past Aquatic Park and through an unused railroad tunnel to Fort Mason.

=== Exploratorium ===
The Exploratorium is a museum in San Francisco that has created over 1,000 participatory exhibits that mix science and art, all of which are made onsite. It is considered by some to be the prototype for participatory museums around the world. On January 2, 2013, the Exploratorium closed its doors to the public at the Palace of Fine Arts and began its move to a new location on Piers 15 and 17 along The Embarcadero. The museum opened to the public at Pier 15 on April 17, 2013.

=== Cruise Terminal ===
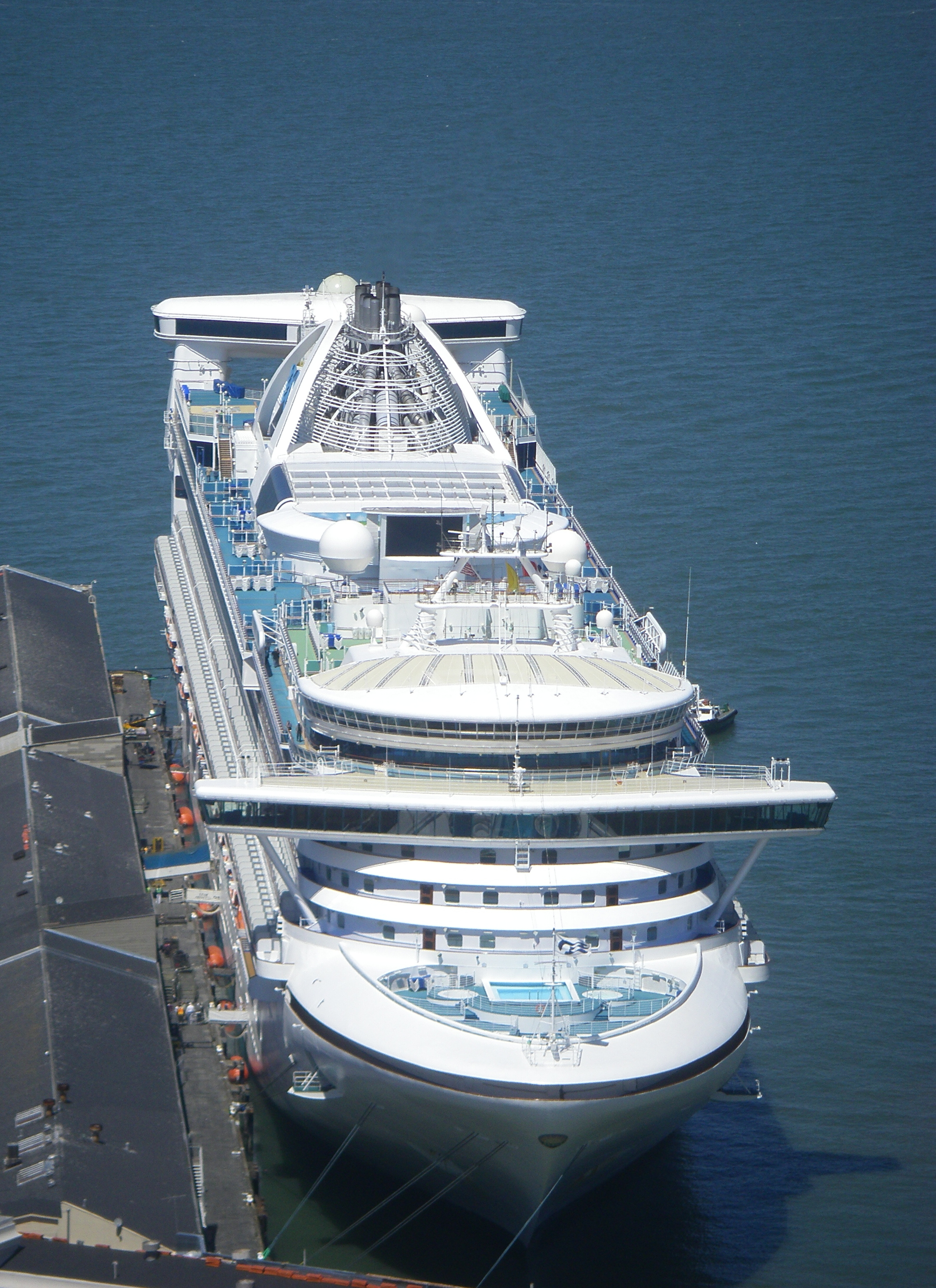
Star Princess docked at Pier 35

The new James R. Herman Cruise Terminal at Pier 27 opened in August 2014 as a replacement to Pier 35. The modern terminal has electric shore power, larger holding areas, and secure customs screening. Pier 35 had neither the sufficient capacity to allow for the increasing length and passenger capacity of new cruise ships nor the amenities needed for an international cruise terminal.

The port currently handles sixty to eighty cruise ship calls and 200,000 passengers and expects an increase to 300,000 in 2015. Itineraries from San Francisco include round trip cruises to Alaska and Hawaii.

So far, the Queen Mary 2 is the largest cruise ship that docked in San Francisco.

On March 16, 2013, Princess Cruises Grand Princess became the first ship to home port in San Francisco year round. The ship offered cruises to Alaska, California Coasts, Hawaii, and Mexico.

In 2018, the port of San Francisco was expected to meet three cruise ships for the first time: the Silver Explorer, Ponant's Le Soléal, and the new Norwegian Bliss that will become the largest ship to visit the city.

=== Oracle Park ===
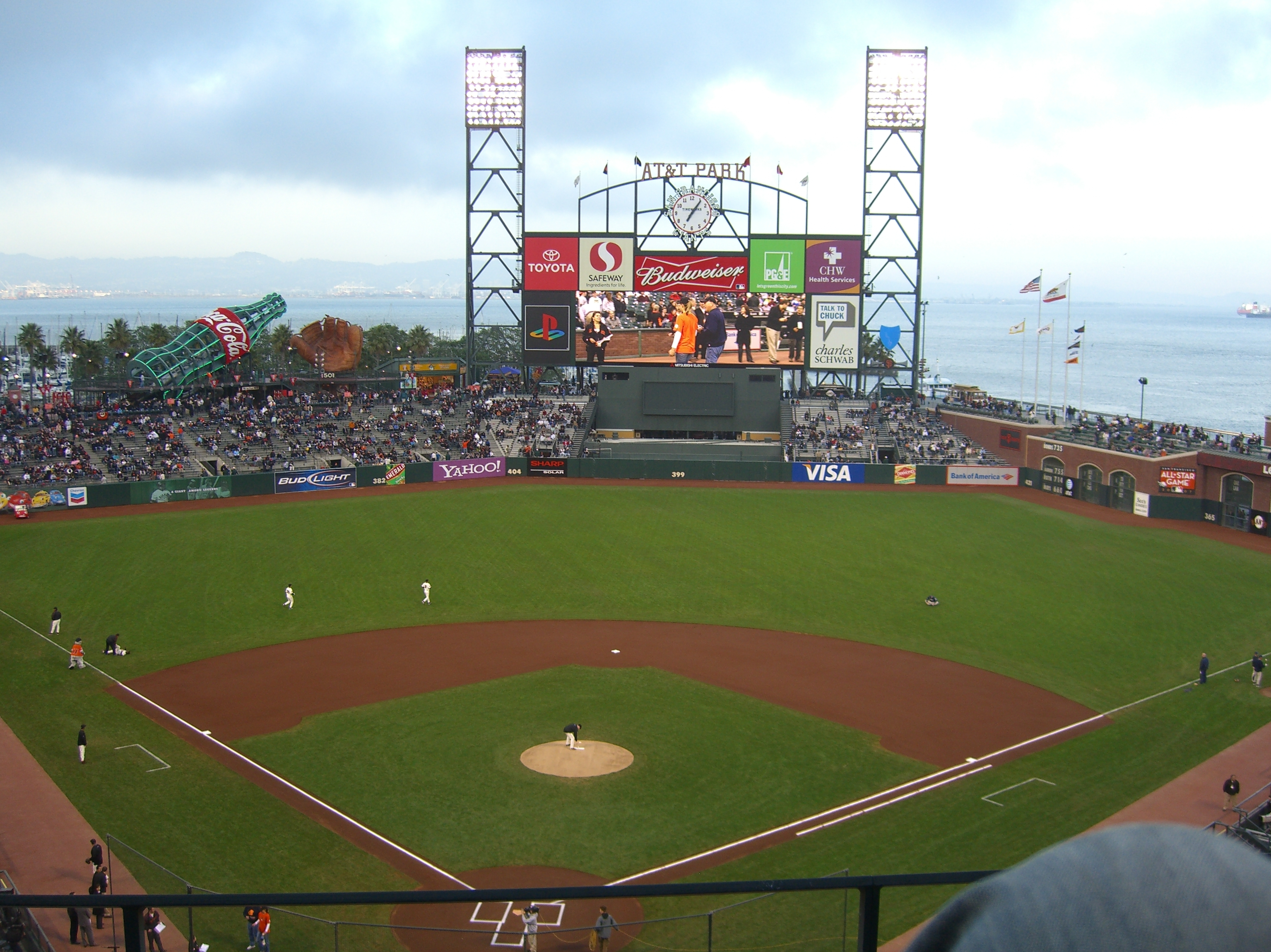
Oracle Park opened in 2000

Oracle Park is a ballpark used for Major League Baseball located in the South of Market neighborhood of San Francisco, California, at 24 Willie Mays Plaza, at the corner of Third and King Streets along the shore of San Francisco Bay. It has served as the home of the San Francisco Giants of Major League Baseball since 2000. The Giants rent the land from the port of San Francisco.

=== Embarcadero Seawall Program ===
The city, acting through the port of San Francisco, launched the Embarcadero Seawall Program to improve seismic performance, provide near-term flood protection improvements, and plan for long-term resilience and sea level rise adaptation along the Embarcadero.

The rebuild of the Embarcadero Seawall is estimated to cost up to $5 billion and take several decades to complete. The Port is planning an initial phase of improvements to address the highest priority life safety projects. This phase will cost $500 million. Phase I funding will require local, state, and federal funding. Local funding will be provided in part by a voter-approved General Obligation Bond of $425 million, which passed with 82% of the vote in the November 2018 election.

== Future developments ==
=== Pier 70 ===
The port of San Francisco owns extensive filled land at the Pier 70, San Francisco, California, Potrero Point district on the southeast bayfront at 20th Street east of Illinois that holds the greatest example of a 19th-century industrial village remaining in the western US, site of the first industrial iron and steel mills, shipbuilding and manufacturing center in California. The Union Iron Works and Bethlehem Shipbuilding as well as the United States Navy have all had shipworks at the site. The current site is now occupied by BAE Systems Ship Repair and Sims Group. In June 2020, a woman owned business operated by a San Francisco native with extensive business and maritime experience, including 25 years of contracting with the City of San Francisco, filed a claim alleging the company SUSTAP responded to the port of San Francisco's RFP for Lease Operation of the Pier 70 Shipyard. SUSTAP alleges its response was feasible and The Port's inaction in the handling of the restart of the Ship Repair facility suggests there was never a true intent to include Ship repair as part of the redevelopment of Pier 70 and that SUSTAP was unfairly used by the Port along the way.

== Cancelled developments ==
=== Warriors Arena ===
The Golden State Warriors of the National Basketball Association in 2012 announced the construction of a new arena to be built on Piers 30–32. The 19,000-seat arena would be built near the foot of the Bay Bridge and open by the 2017–18 season.

On April 22, 2014, the Warriors announced they abandoned the Pier 30-32 location and have purchased land in the Mission Bay neighborhood for their new arena.

=== USS Iowa ===
In 2006 the US Navy approached the city of San Francisco about permanently docking the retired USS Iowa as a floating museum and tourist attraction in Fisherman's Wharf. The Board of Supervisors voted against the idea out of protest of Don't ask, don't tell. In 2012, the battleship opened as a museum at the Port of Los Angeles.

=== Chelsea Piers ===
In 2001 the Port planned on converting Piers 27, 29, and 31 into a recreation and athletic facility to be managed by the Chelsea Piers Sports and Entertainment Complex. The plan was shelved and Piers 27 and 29 are now used as the Cruise Terminal.

== Gallery ==
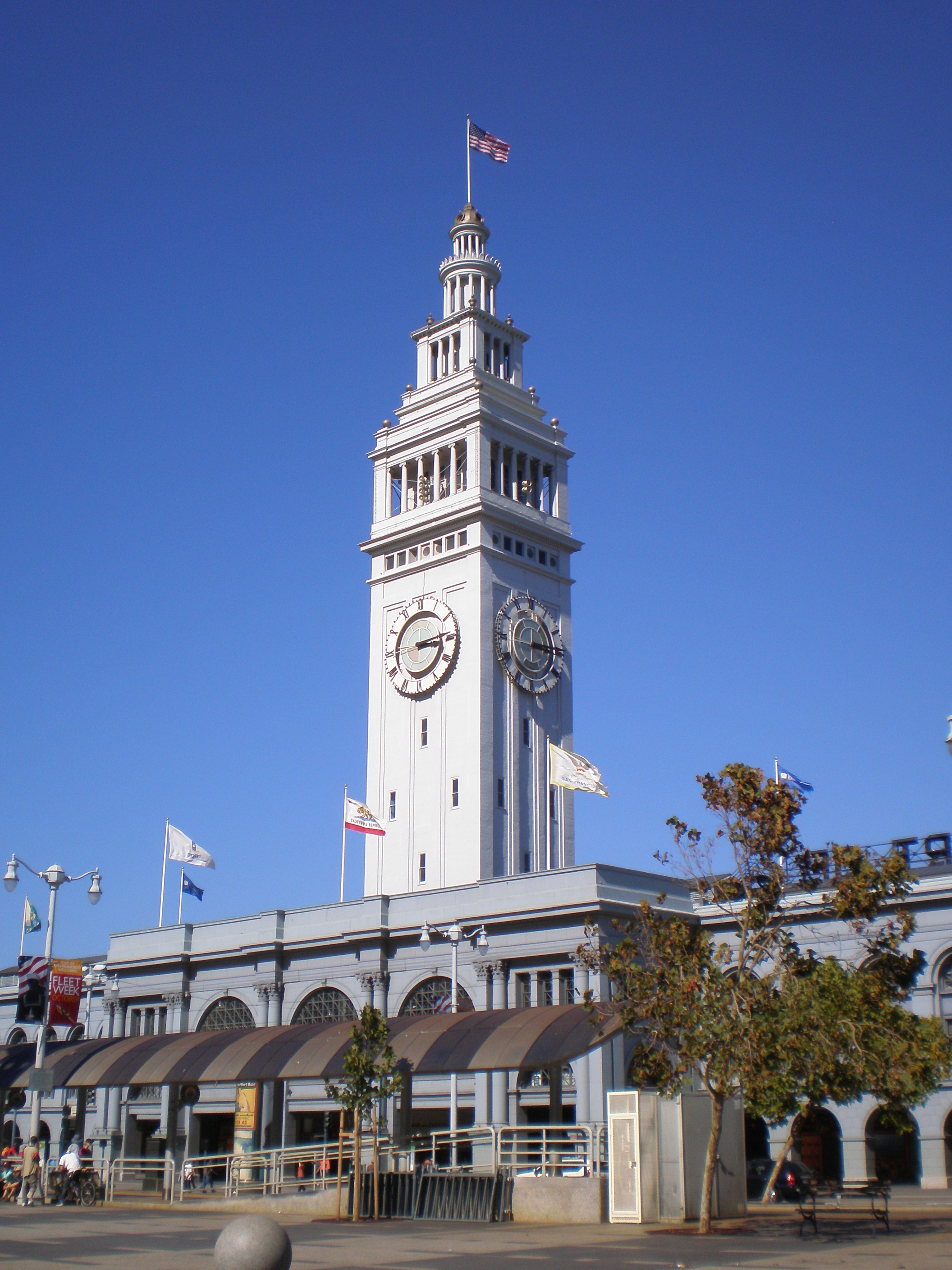
San Francisco Ferry Building

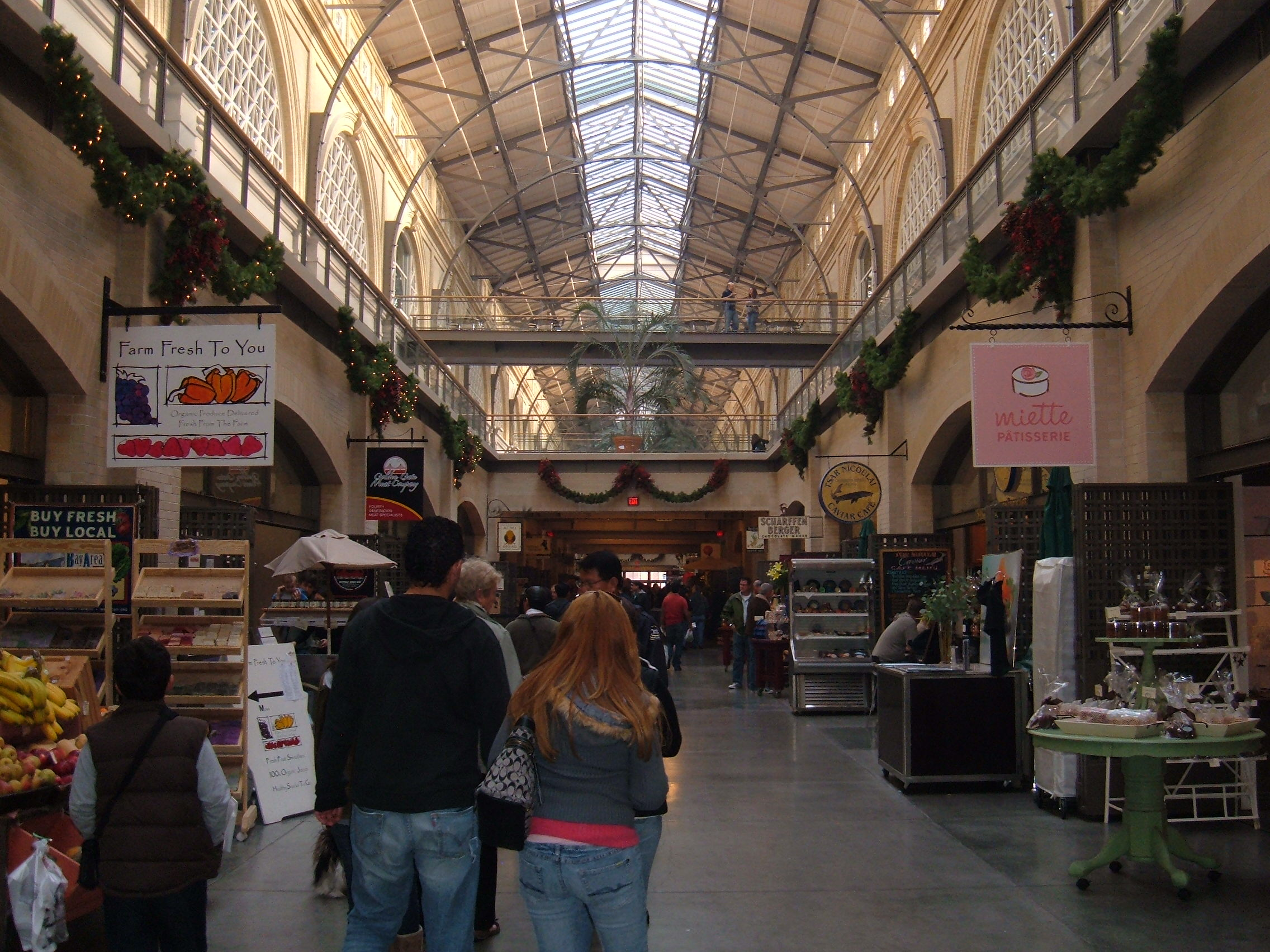
Ferry Building interior

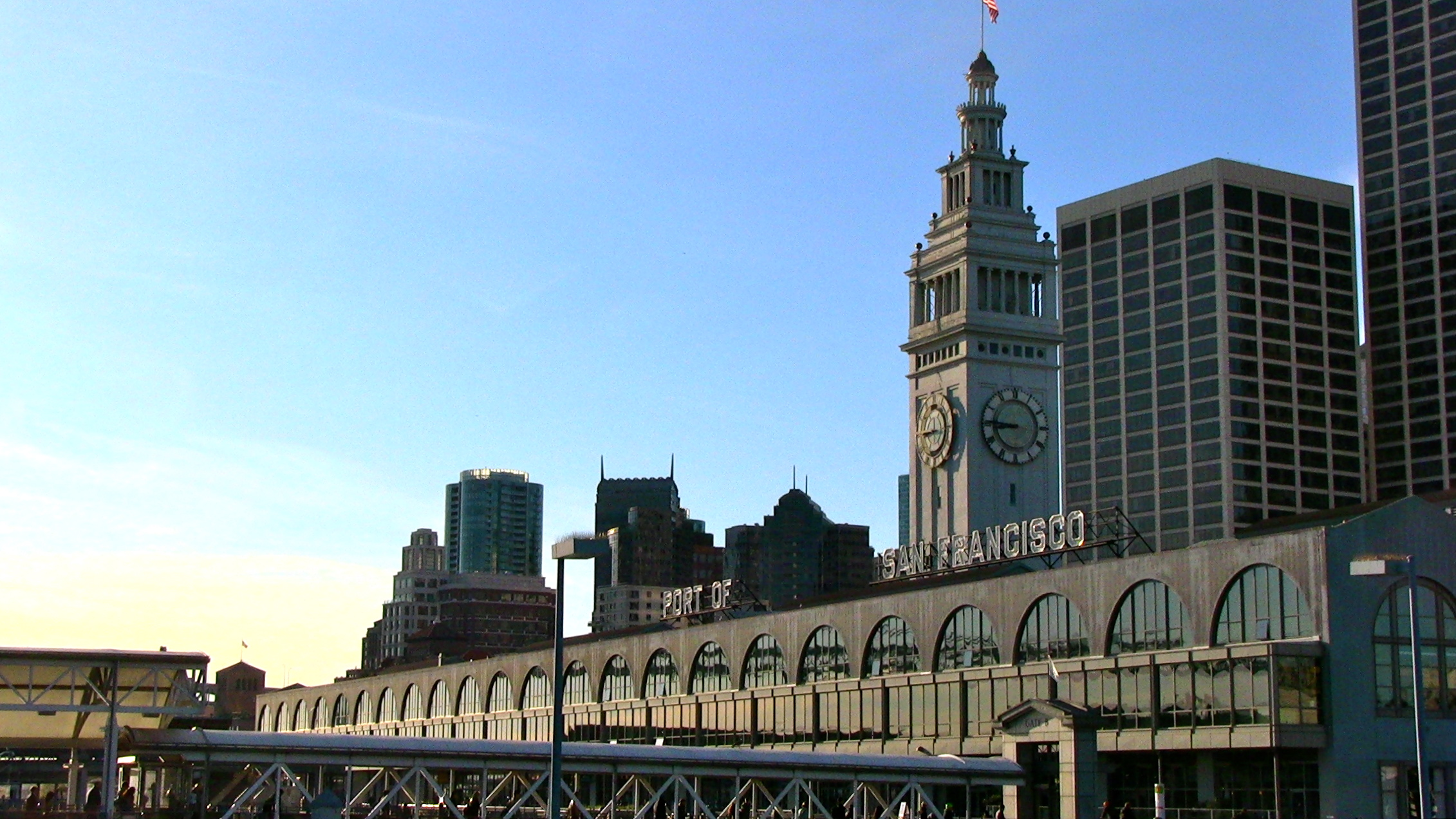
Ferry Building clock tower

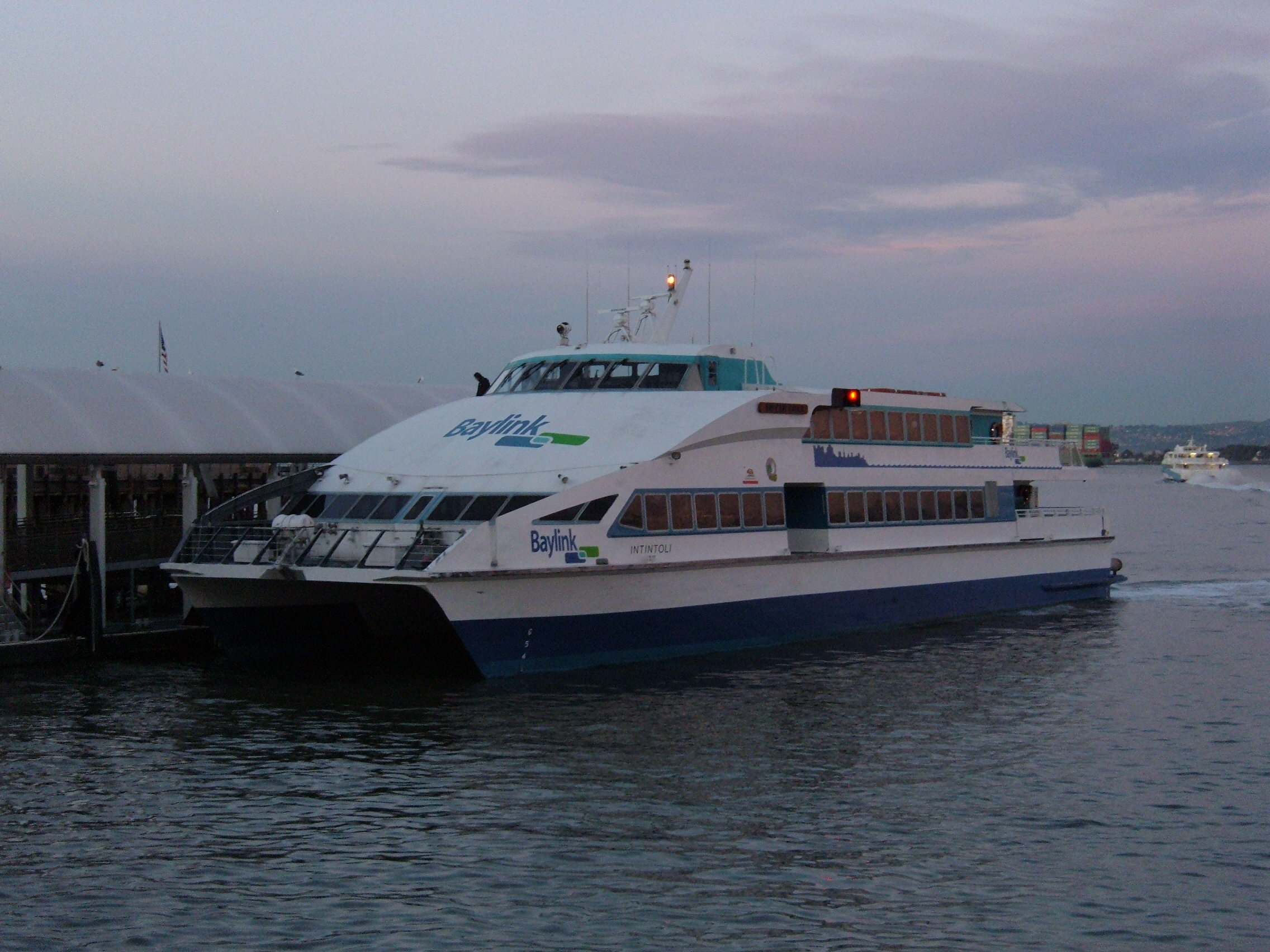
Baylink Ferry

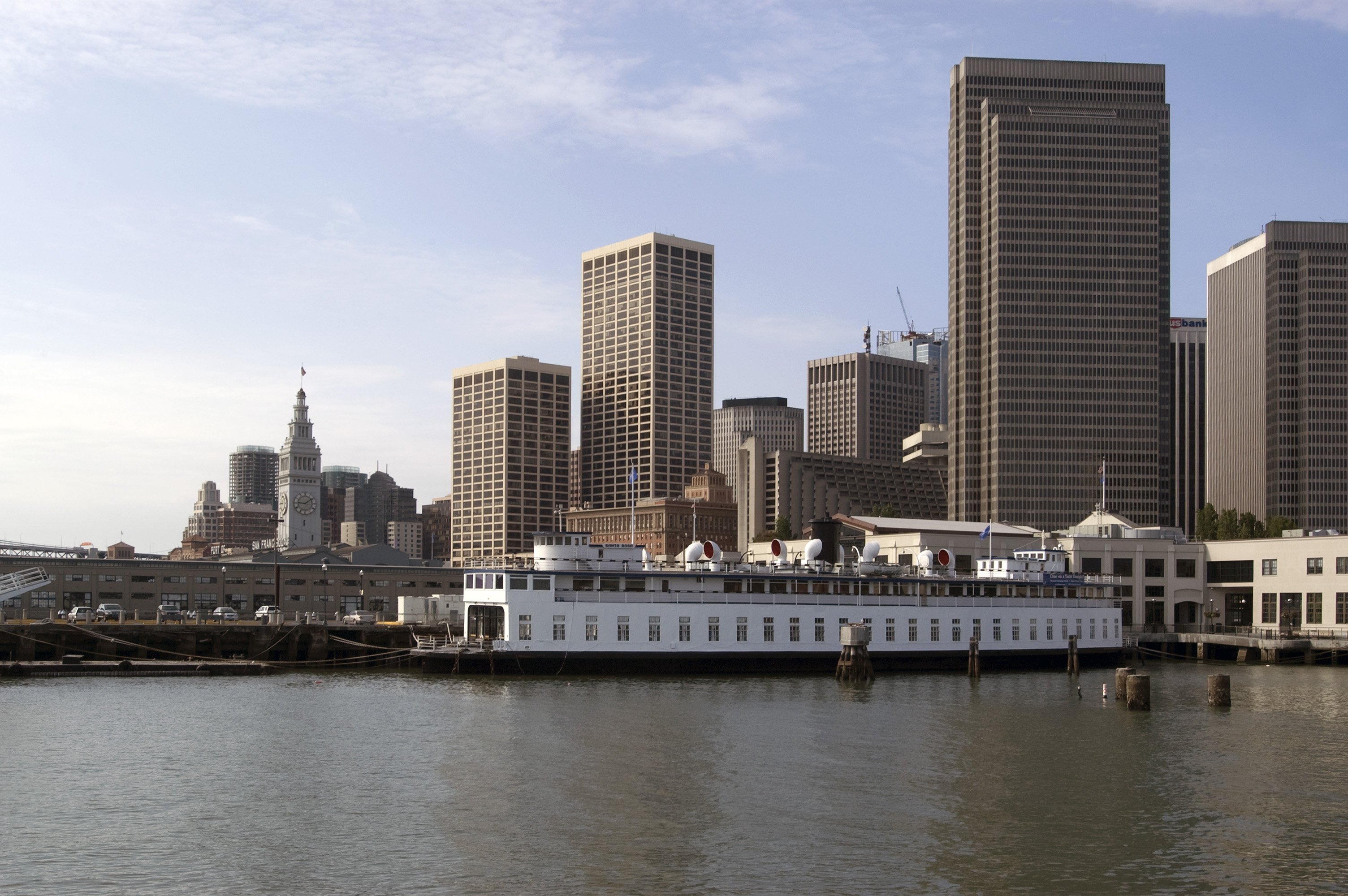
Ferryboat MV Santa Rosa

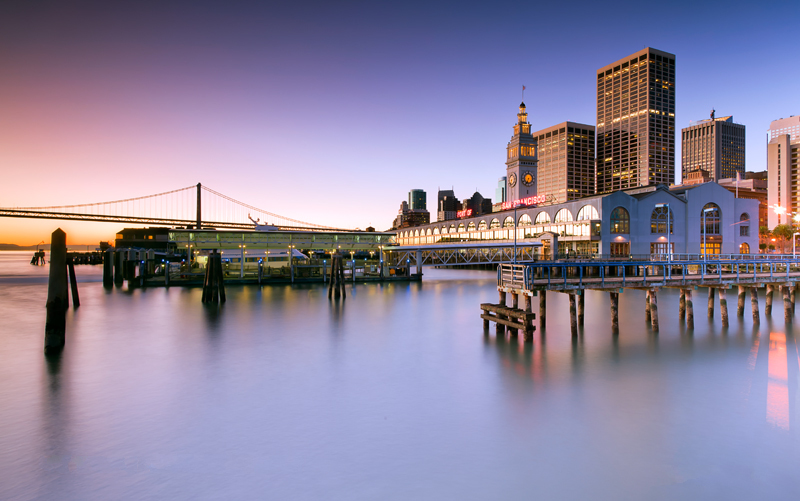
Ferry Building

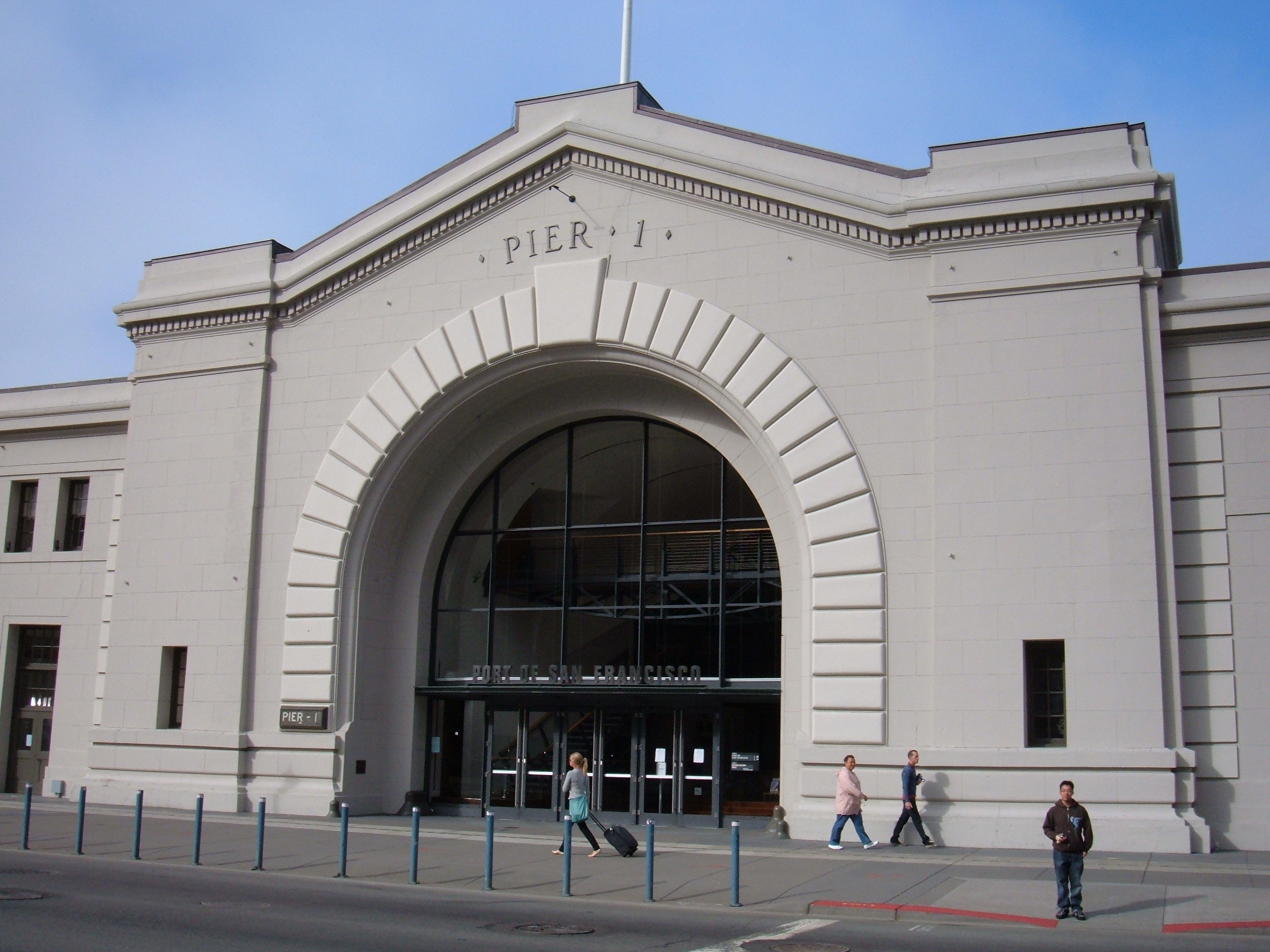
Pier 1

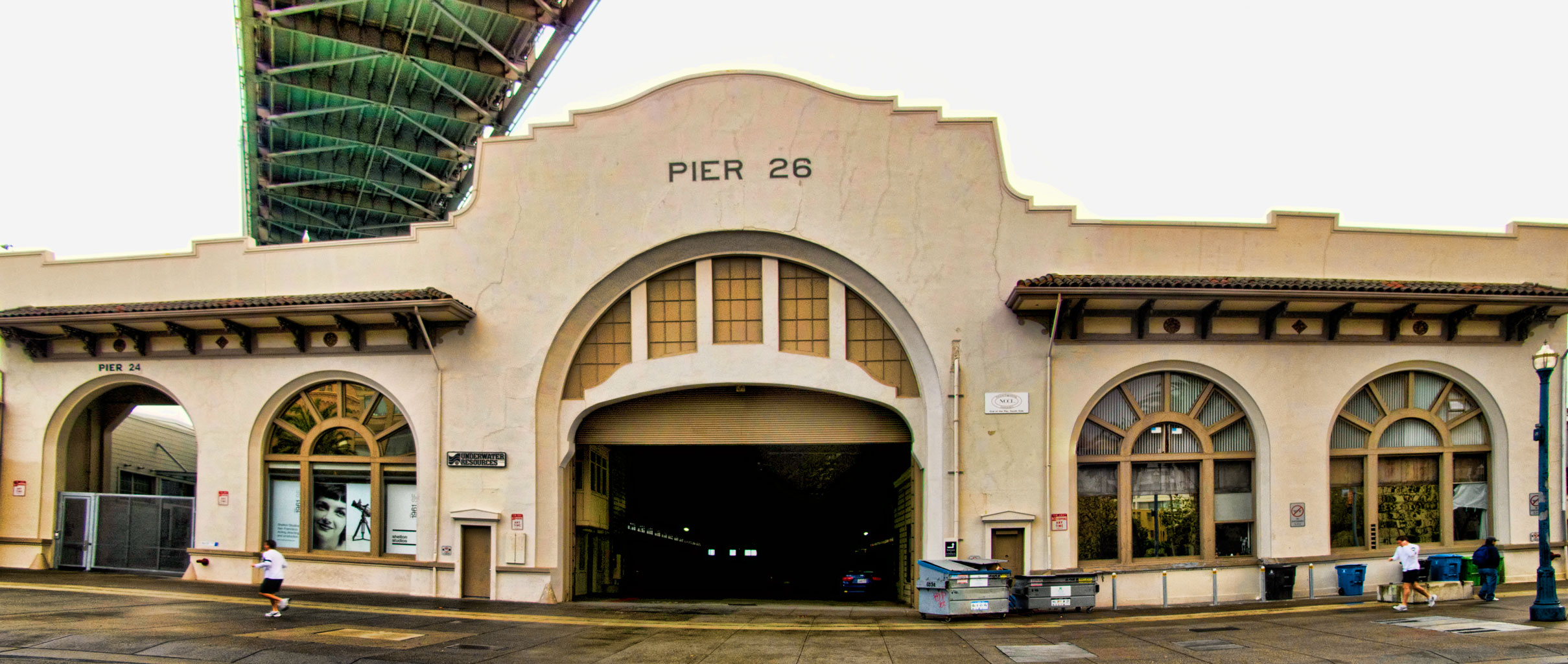
Pier 26

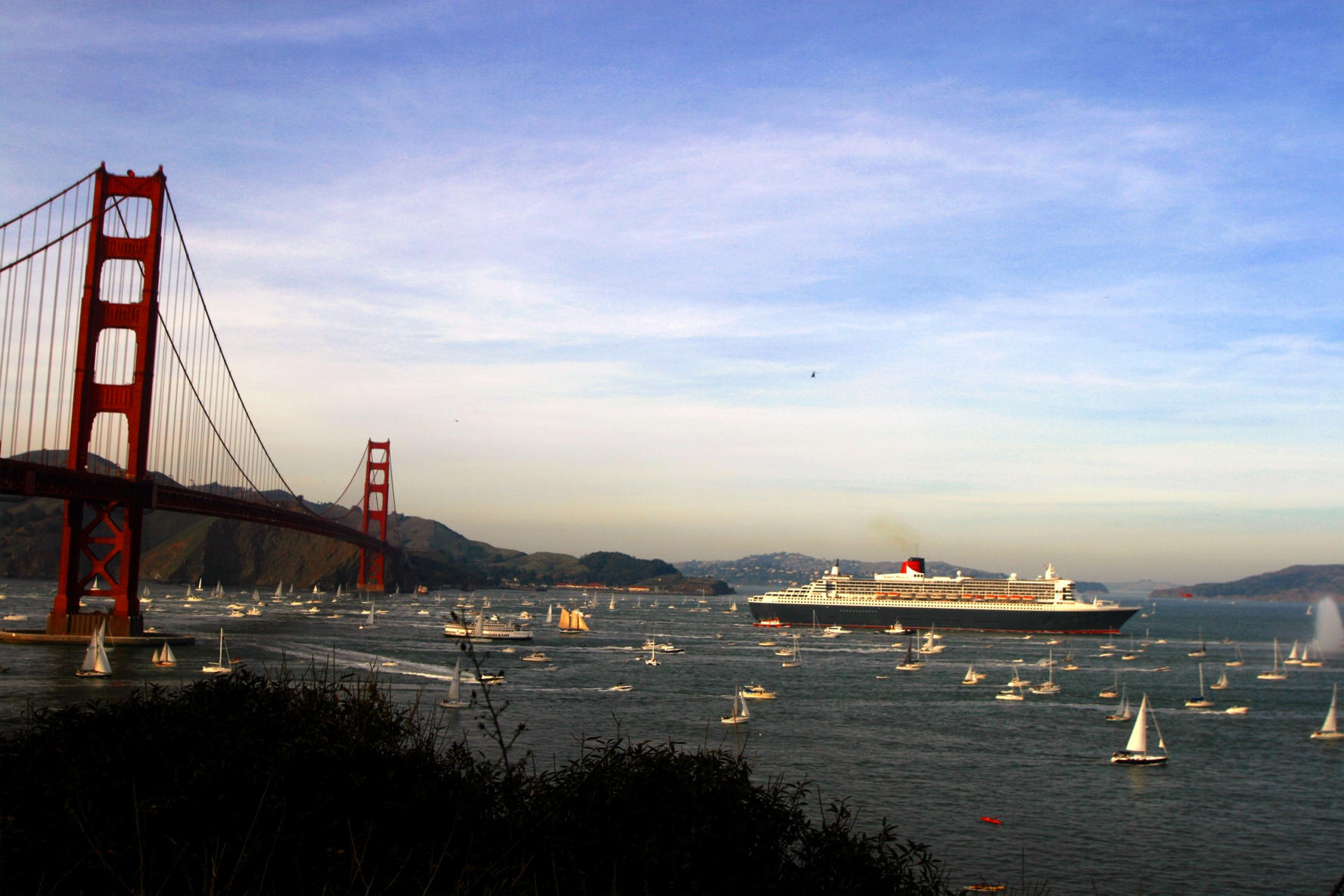
RMS Queen Mary 2

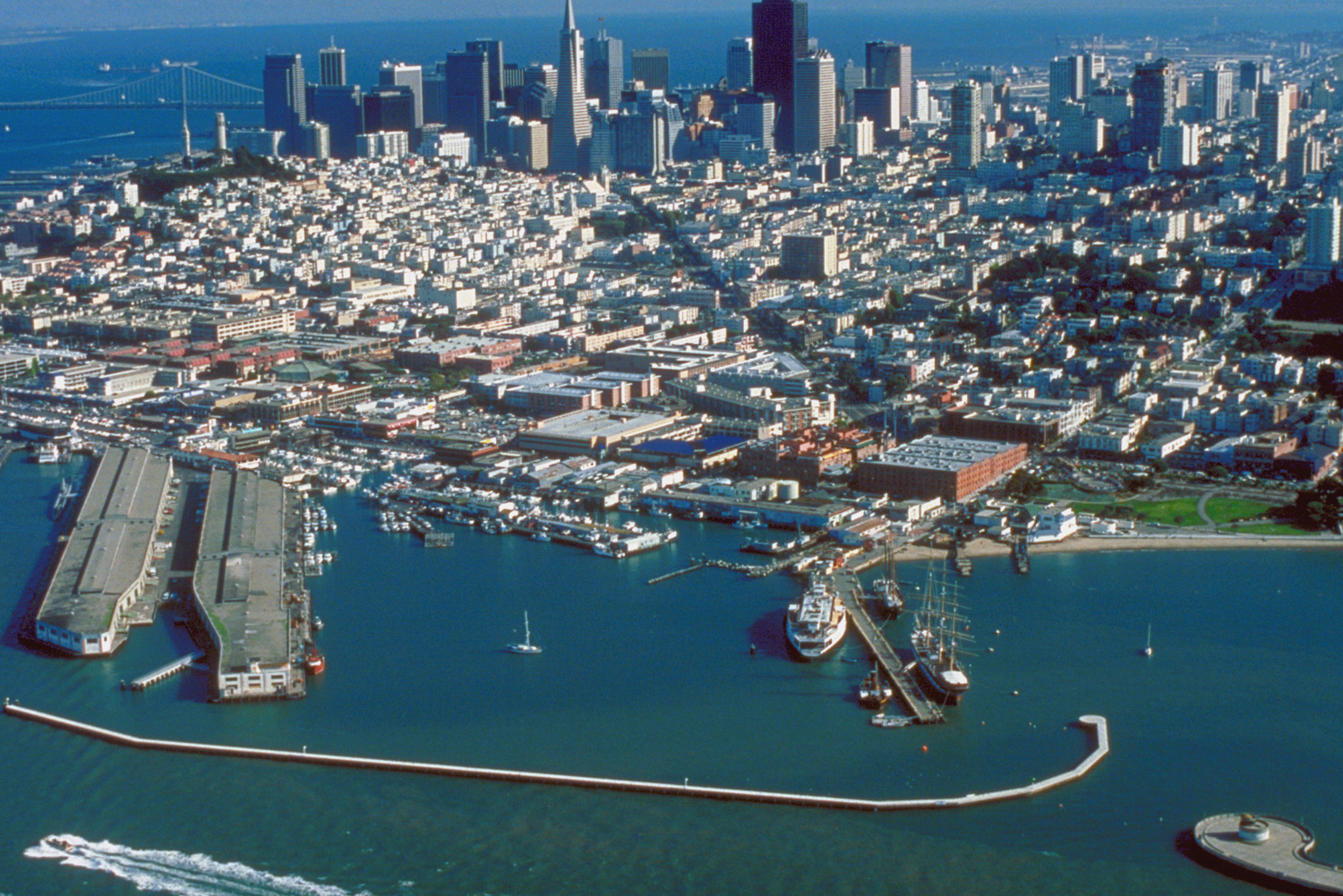
Wharf area

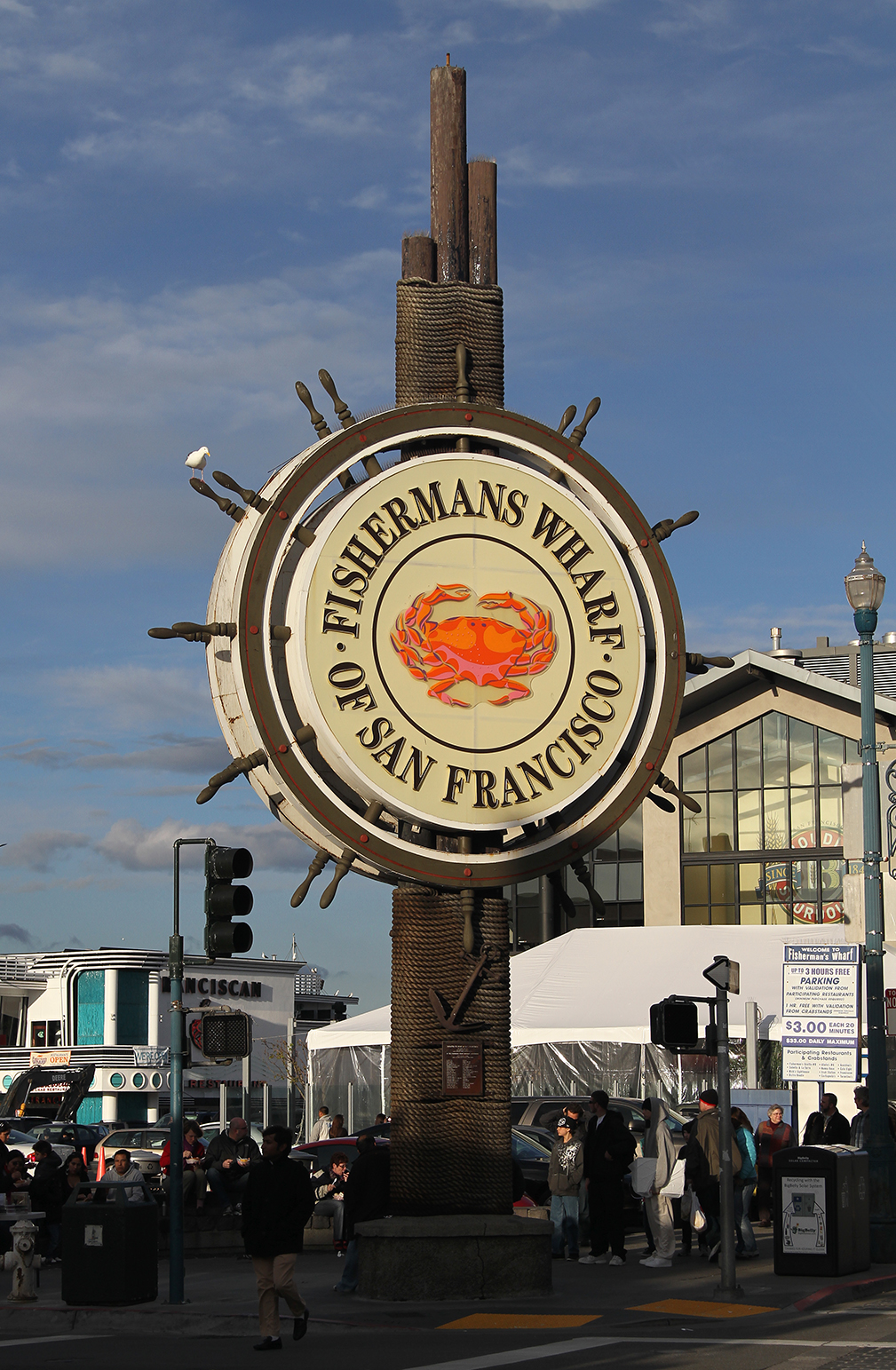
Wharf sign

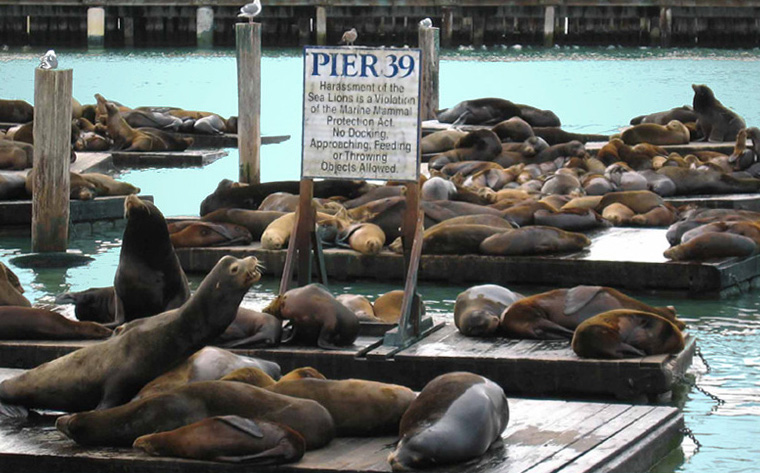
Sea Lions at Pier 39

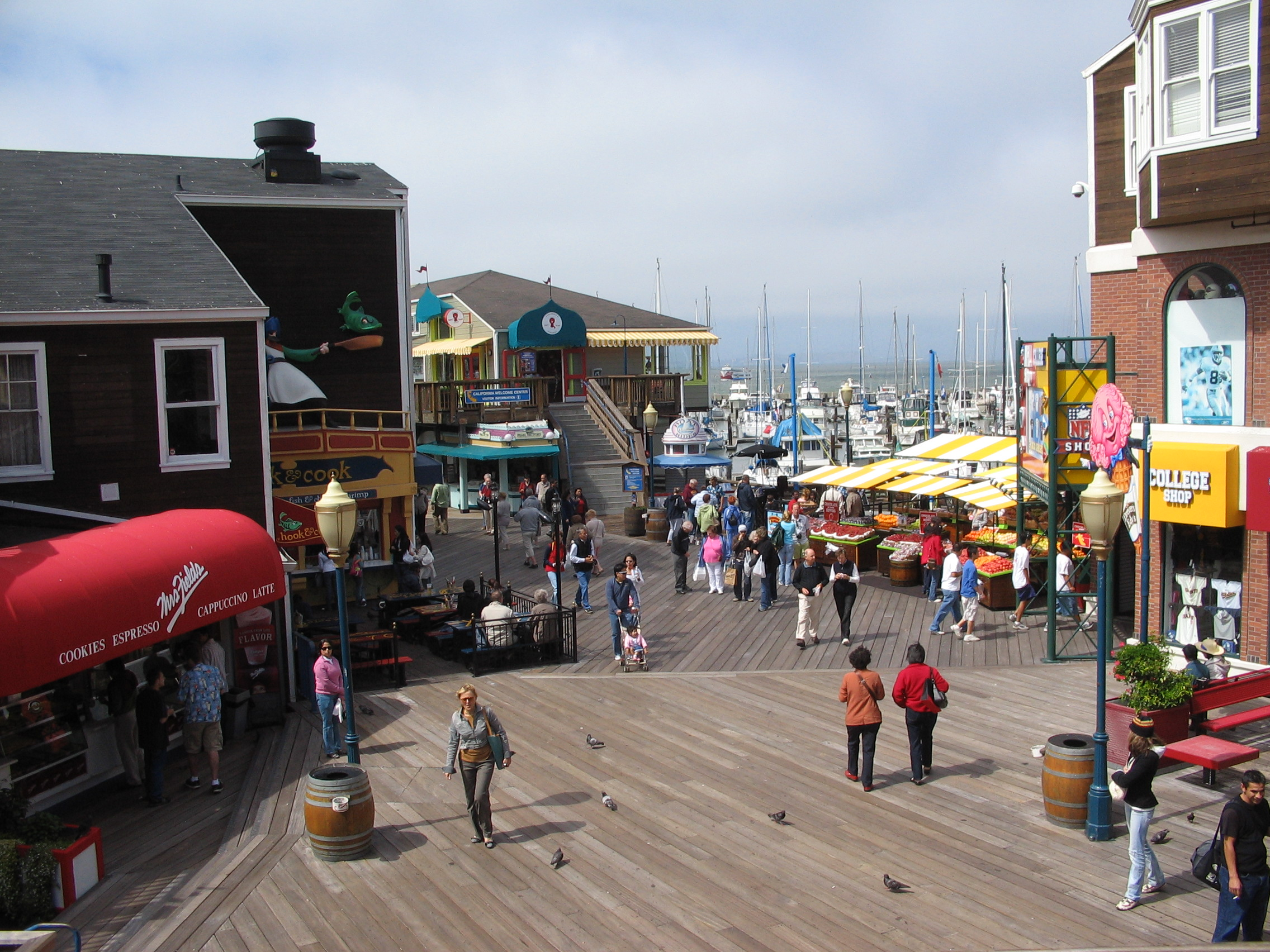
Pier 39

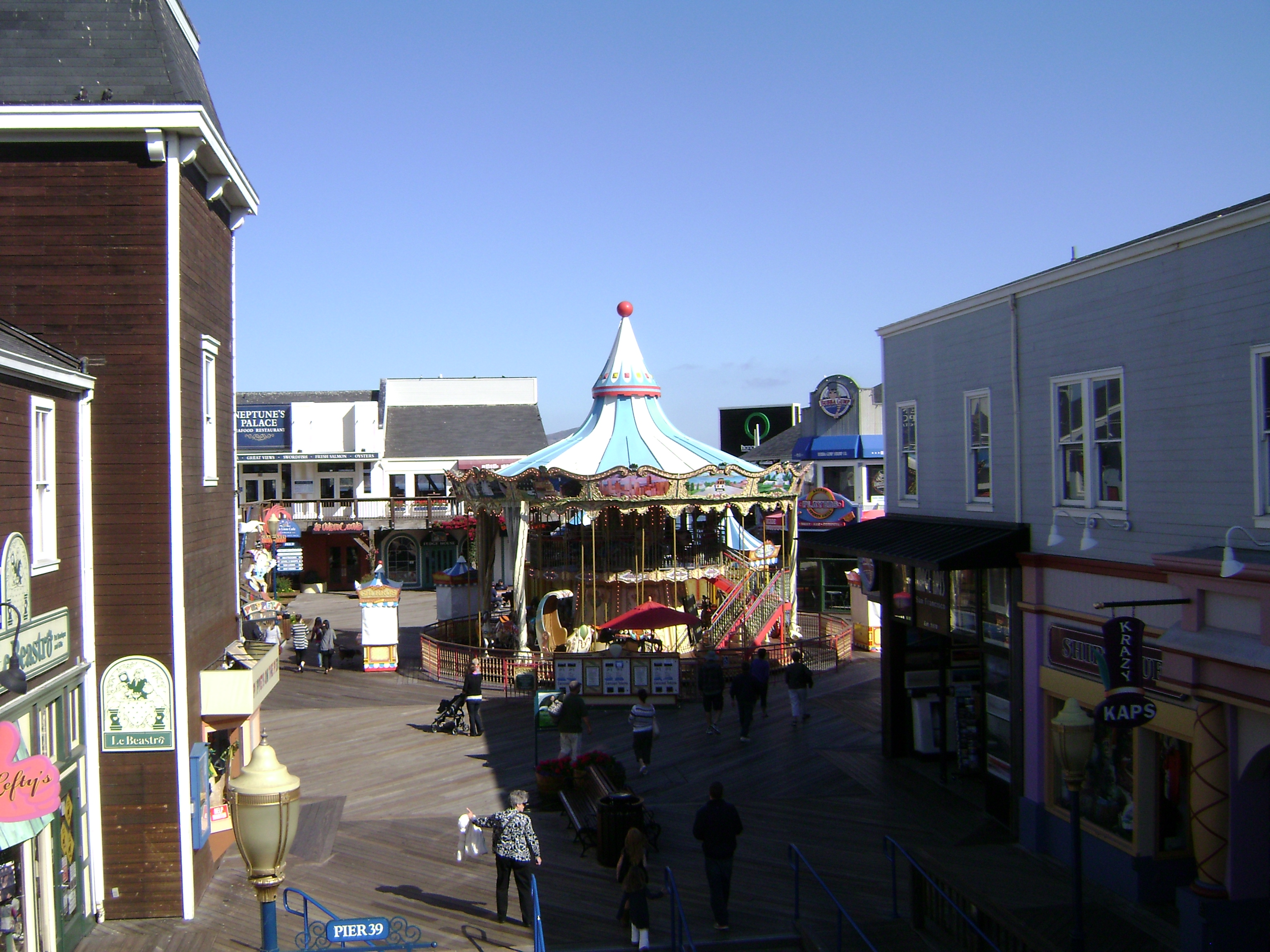
Carousel at Pier 39

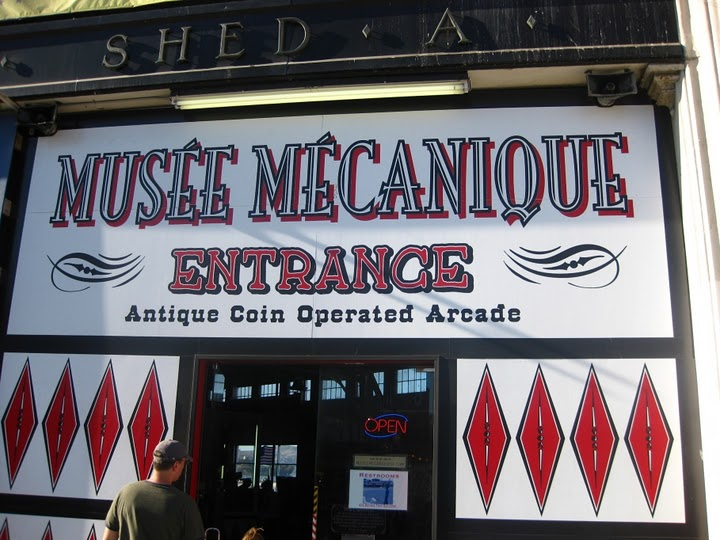
Musee Mechanique at Fisherman's Wharf

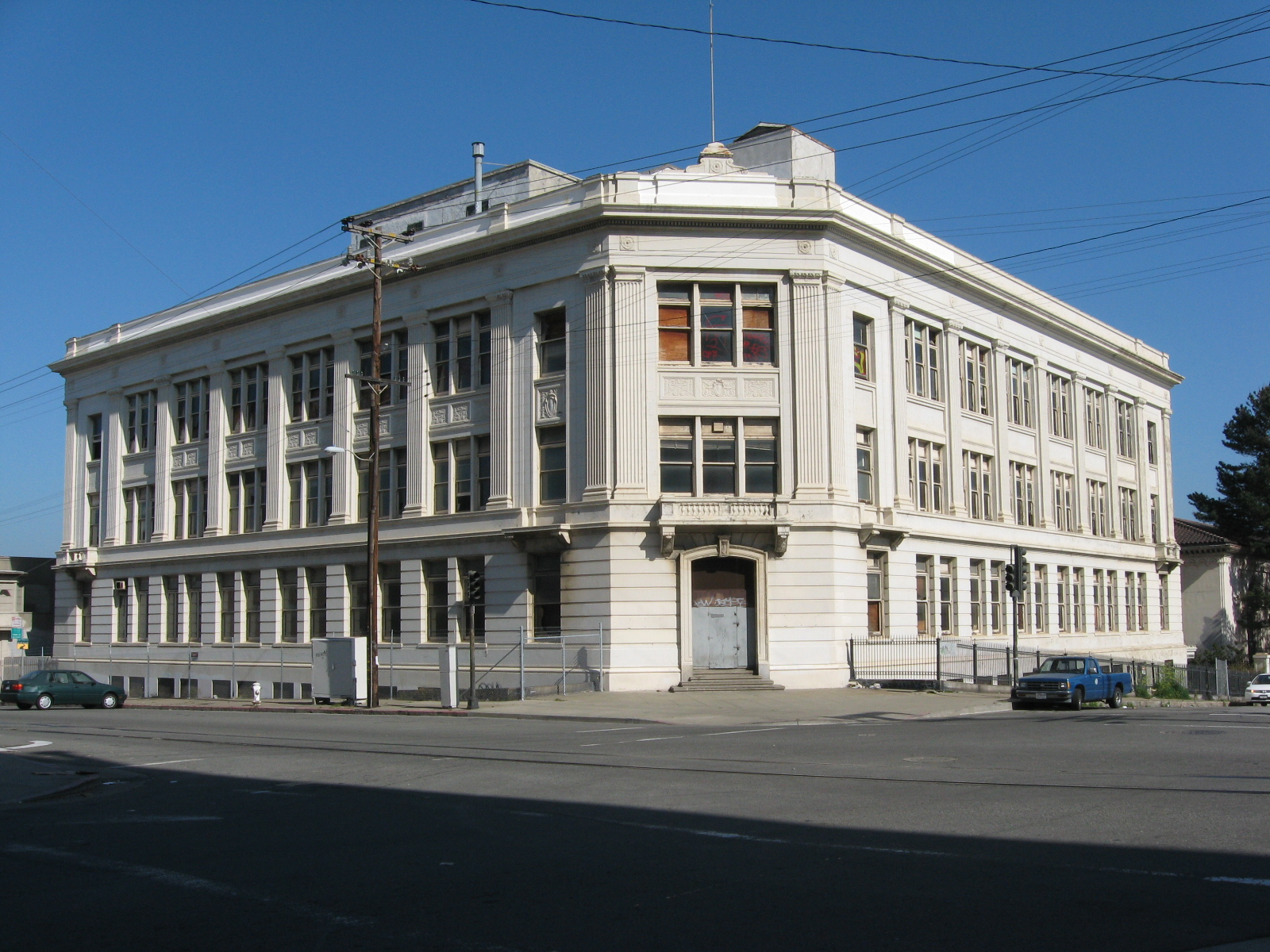
Old Bethlehem Steel headquarters at 20th and Illinois

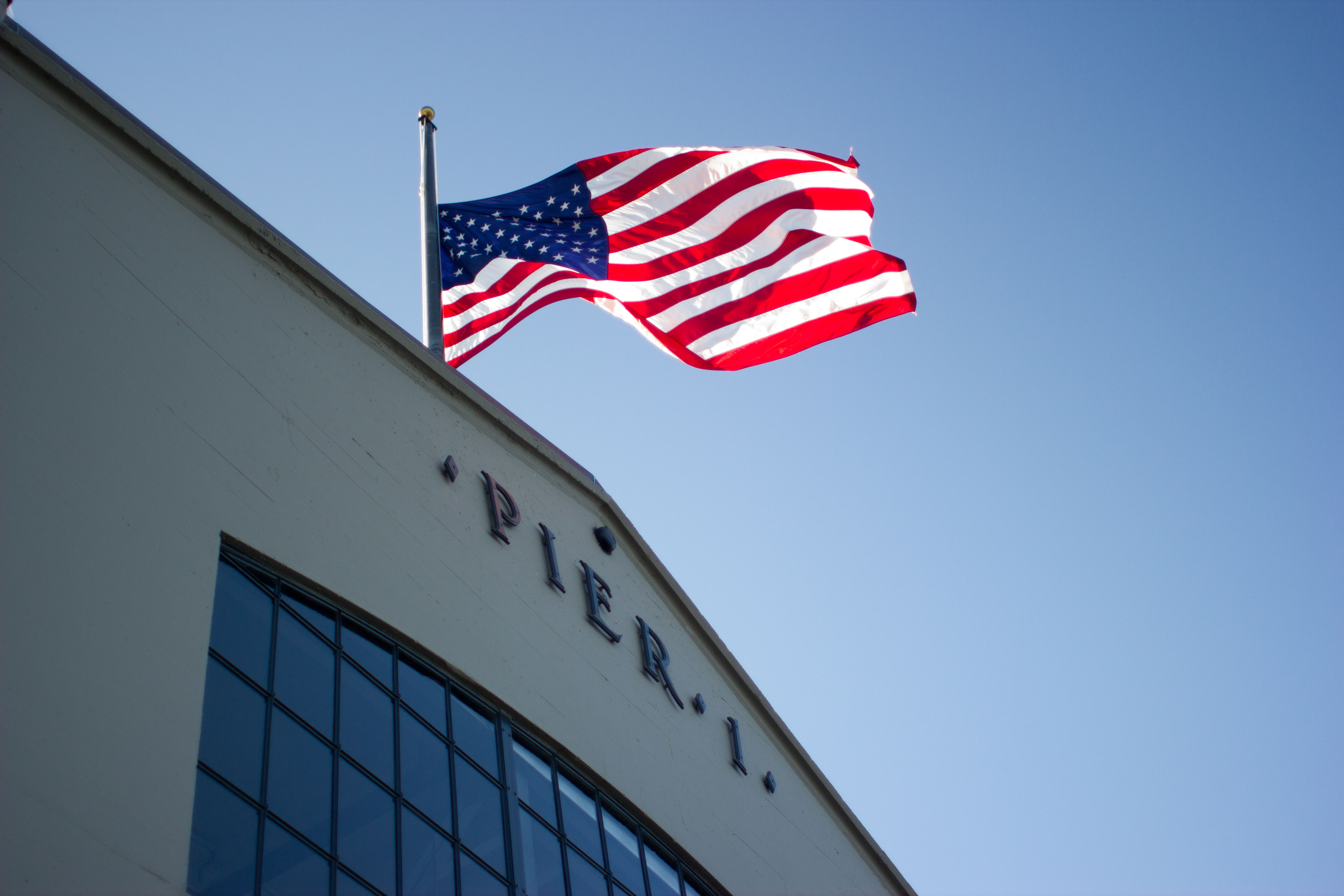
Pier 1

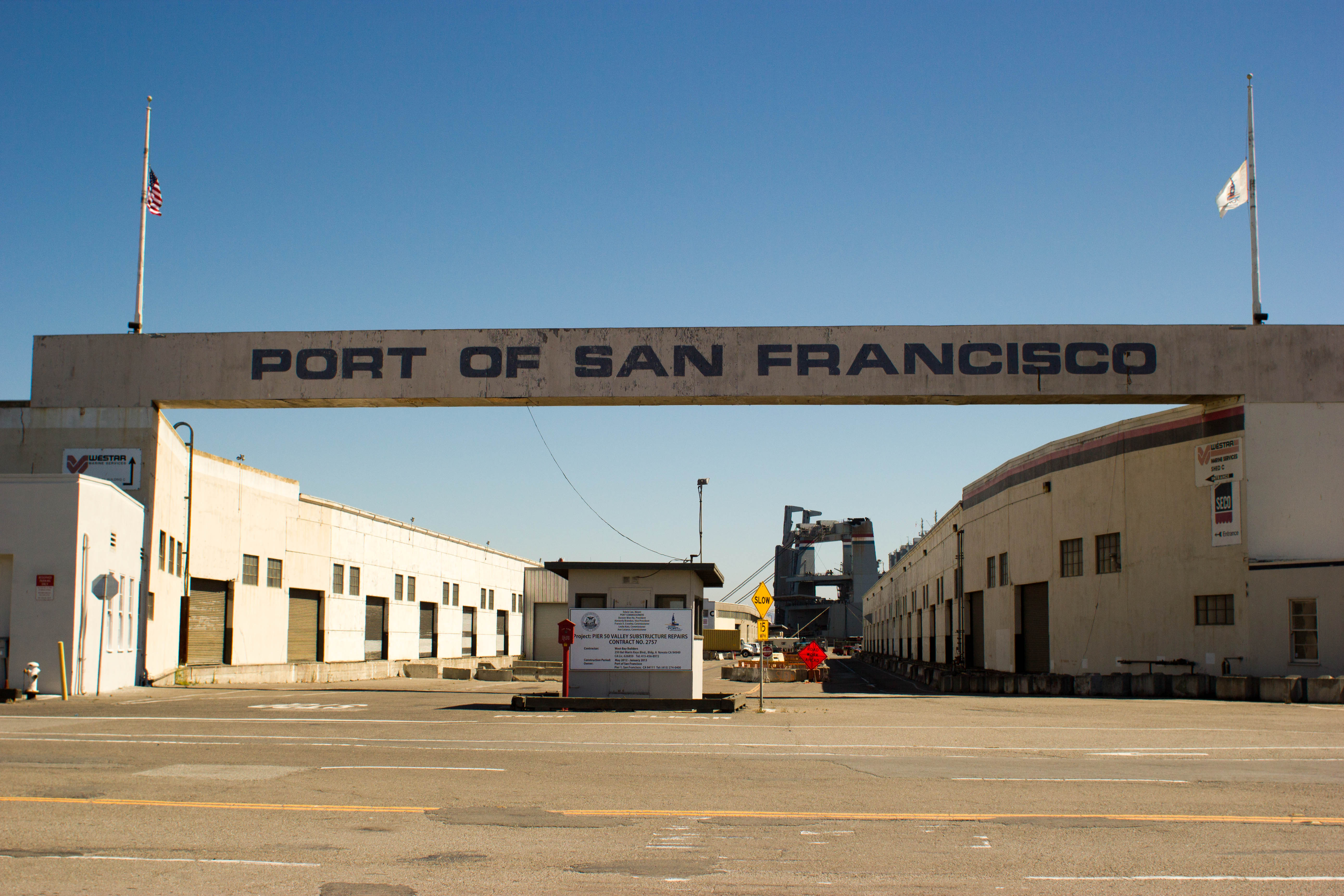
Port of San Francisco

== See also ==
- List of ports in the United States
- United States container ports
- Port of Oakland
- 1934 West Coast waterfront strike
- Pier 26, San Francisco, California
- 34th America's Cup
