= California State Lands Commission =

Unit of California state government

Agency overview
- Website: www.slc.ca.gov

The California State Lands Commission is a unit of state government that is responsible for management and protection of the state's interest in its natural and cultural resources, as well as public access rights, on some of California's publicly owned lands.

The members of the State Lands Commission include the Lieutenant Governor, the State Controller and the State Director of Finance. The first two are statewide elected officials while the last is a cabinet-level officer appointed by the Governor.

The Commission has a staff of more than 200 people, supervised by an executive officer appointed by the Commissioners. Staff members include specialists in mineral resources, land management, boundary determination, petroleum engineering and natural sciences.

== History ==
The Office of the California Surveyor General was established in 1850 and its responsibilities would later fall under the State Lands Commission. The Surveyors General from 1850 to 1929 and their years of service were:

1. Charles J. Whiting, 1850-1852
2. William M. Eddy, 1852-1854
3. Senaca H. Marlette, 1854-1856
4. John A. Brewster, 1856-1858
5. Horace A. Higley, 1858-1862
6. James F. Houghton, 1862-1868
7. John W. Bost, 1868-1872
8. Robert Gardner, 1872-1876
9. William Minis, 1876-1880
10. James W. Shanklin, 1880-1882
11. Henry I. Willey, 1882-1886
12. Theodore Reichert, 1886-1894
13. Martin J. Wright, 1894-1902
14. Victor H. Woods, 1902-1906
15. William S. Kingsbury, 1906-1929
