= John Alexander Brewster =

American politician

John Alexander Brewster (1826–1889) was the fourth California Surveyor General, serving from 1856 to 1858.

He first traveled to California with explorer John C. Frémont. Although the exact date of his arrival in California is not known, it probably predated the arrival of any other Surveyor General; he was most likely a resident of California prior to the Gold Rush. Brewster was elected Surveyor of Sonoma County, and his 1854 map of Santa Rosa was the first map recorded in that county.

== Know-Nothings ==
In the early 1850s, the Whig party collapsed and a new political party emerged. This party called itself the American Party and its candidates were elected overwhelmingly in the 1855 California state election. General John A. Brewster was elected as a member of the American Party.

Although popular in its day, the American party's platform opposing the election of Roman Catholics and "foreigners" was controversial. The American Party came to be known as the "Know Nothing Party", because when asked about its platform, the members said: "I know nothing".

== Wagon roads ==
By the mid-1850s, the public cry for developed wagon roads became so insistent that two routes over the Sierra Nevada mountains were proposed. In August 1856, Brewster led a reconnaissance party to Downieville, Sierra County, in order to examine one of these alternative routes over the Sierras. On the eastern side of Sierra County, they

... passed parties of Indians, over 350 in number, belonging to two different tribes, who had been holding a "grand talk," to settle some disputes about their hunting grounds; and their council having broken up, they were now on their way to their autumnal haunts. A few had horses, on which the happy possessors pranced in great state, while the squaws and half grown children, dragged after them the lodge-poles, on which were fastened their household gear, and in some instances, a papoose, whose glittering eyes shone out in wonderment amid the confused mass of Indian baggage.

— Surveyor General's Annual Report, 1856

In October 1856, he led a second expedition through Calaveras County. In his Annual Report of 1856, Brewster recommended funding the survey and construction of 6 major routes into California, as well as the building of other roads, and a railroad for commerce and transportation.

== Official problems ==
General Brewster inherited a legacy of problems with his office.

... it often happens that survey returns of locations of warrants are made when the register in this office shows the same to have been located in a different county and by a different person. The law should either prescribe some system, or authorize the Surveyor General to issue instructions whereby this conflict of title should be avoided.

— from the Surveyor General's Annual Report of 1856.

General Brewster discovered that surveys of Swamp and Overflowed lands by the United States Deputy Surveyors differed, in some cases by several million acres, from the amounts recommended by the California Surveyor General to be donated to the State.

Like General Marlette before him, Brewster noted significant errors in surveys of county boundaries, calling for alterations in the boundaries of several counties to avoid ambiguity, since, "in some instances it is impossible to determine the lines at all."

"The existing official map of the State is a broad burlesque upon the topography of California ... and (it) should be replaced at once by a map conforming to the true character of the country." It is not known if Brewster ever completed a new, official map.

== Family life ==
After his term as Surveyor General, Brewster traveled east to marry Julia E. Kaene, a native of Canada, on November 1, 1858, in Buffalo, New York. The General and his wife returned to California and made their home in Sonoma.

General Brewster mustered into the 63rd Indiana Volunteers, US (Union) Army during the American Civil War. He penned the following to his infant daughter during his service:

... Should I fall on the battlefield or fall a victim to the disease of camp, remember you are a soldier's daughter, to whom a legacy has been left, - a charge to so live that beyond the grave you may be reunited to brother, and mother, & the father who so dearly loved you, & who now leaves you to the God who doeth all things well.

— John A. Brewster

Brewster survived the Civil War, and died in California at the age of 62. He is interred in Cypress Lawn Memorial Park, Colma, California.
