= List of tallest buildings in San Francisco =

Skyline of San Francisco
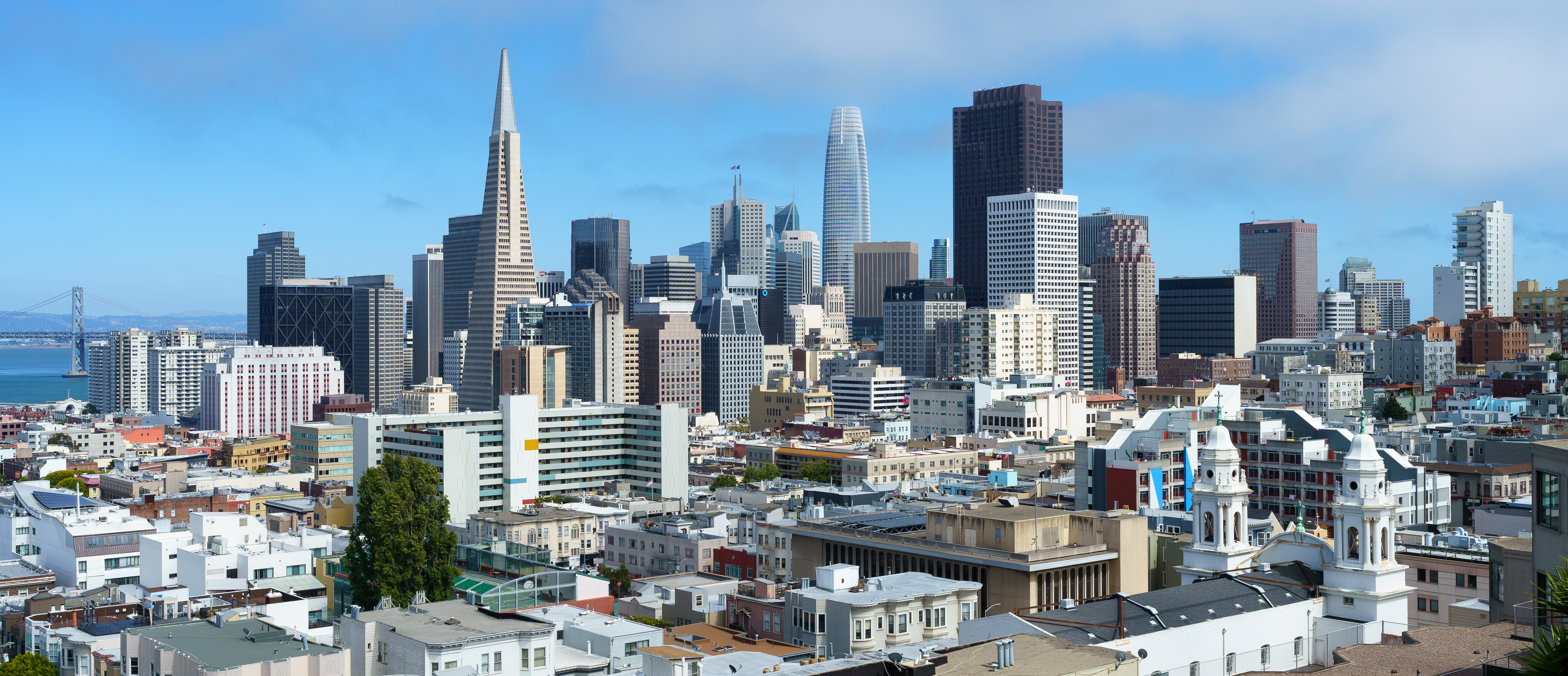
- The Financial District from Ina Coolbrith Park in 2021
- Tallest building: Salesforce Tower (2018)
- Tallest building height: 1,070 ft (326.1 m)
- First 150 m+ building: 44 Montgomery (1967)

Number of tall buildings (2026)
- Taller than 100 m (328 ft): 100
- Taller than 150 m (492 ft): 27
- Taller than 200 m (656 ft): 5
- Taller than 300 m (984 ft): 1

Number of tall buildings — feet
- Taller than 300 ft (91.4 m): 124

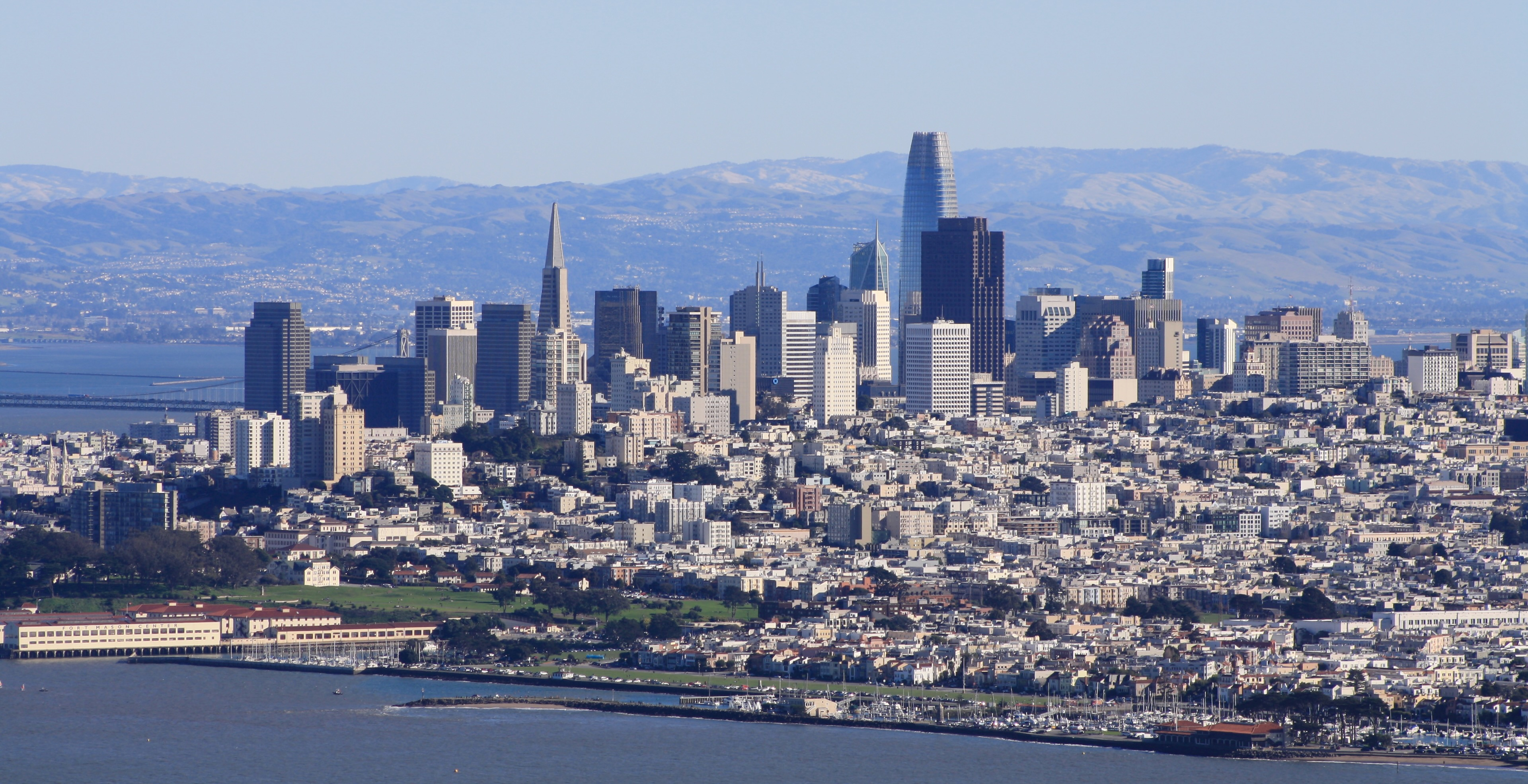
San Francisco from Marin Headlands

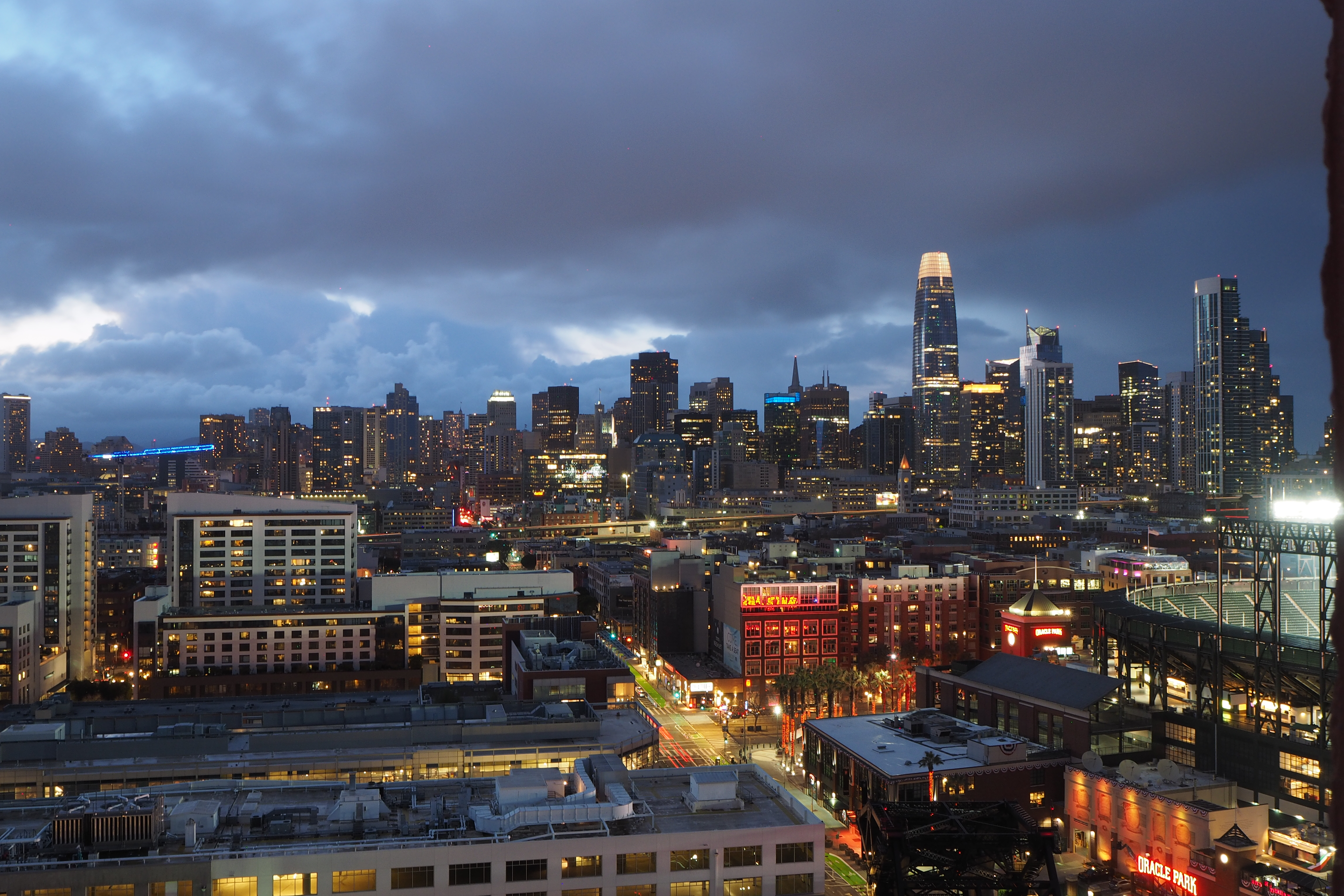
San Francisco skyline from Mission Bay during sunset in 2024

San Francisco, a major city in the U.S state of California, has over 480 high-rises, 124 of which are at least 300 feet (91 m) tall as of 2026. The tallest building in the city is Salesforce Tower, the city's sole supertall skyscraper. Headquarters of software company Salesforce, it was completed in 2018 at a height of 1,070 ft (326.1 m). It is the 18th-tallest building in the United States and the second tallest in California. San Francisco has the second largest skyline in the Western United States. It has the second most skyscrapers taller than 492 ft (150 m) in California, with 27, after Los Angeles. When ranked by buildings that reach 300 ft (91 m), San Francisco has more skyscrapers than Los Angeles, and is tied with Atlanta as having the fifth-most in the United States, after New York City, Chicago, Miami, and Houston.

The history of skyscrapers in San Francisco began with the 218-foot (66 m), ten-story Chronicle Building, which was completed in 1890. During the 1920s, San Francisco underwent one of the largest pre-war skyscraper booms in the United States, constructing ten structures greater than 300 ft (91 m), including the Telephone Building and the Russ Building. The Great Depression and World War II halted skyscraper development for two decades until the 1950s. Many of San Francisco's tallest buildings, particularly its office skyscrapers, were built in a major construction boom between the 1960s and the late 1980s. This included the iconic Transamerica Pyramid in 1972, which rises to 853 feet (260 m).

After a pause in the 1990s, high-rise construction resumed from the 2000s onward, with an increased share of residential buildings. The rate of development increased in the second half of the 2010s. New additions expanded the skyline towards the south and southeast, particularly in the neighborhoods of SoMa and Rincon Hill. The Transbay development resulted in the completion of the Salesforce Tower and the city's third-tallest building, 181 Fremont. The COVID-19 pandemic of the early 2020s heavily curtailed high-rise construction in the city, while commercial real estate in existing skyscrapers was heavily affected. A number of planned projects could extend the skyline significantly in the future, such as the redevelopment of the Caltrain railyards and the ongoing Treasure Island Development.

The large majority of tall buildings in San Francisco are concentrated in the city's Financial District, located in the northeastern corner of the San Francisco Peninsula. There is also a notable high-rise cluster at the intersection of Market Street and Van Ness Avenue. Shorter high-rises are spread more sparsely in nearby neighborhoods, such as in Russina Hill, Nob Hill, Pacific Heights, and in Mission Bay, where the Mission Rock project is under development. The western half of the city, including the Richmond and Sunset districts that surround Golden Gate Park, is almost entirely devoid of high-rises. San Francisco's skyline is a common photography subject, with a popular viewpoint being that from the Twin Peaks as well as the Marin Headlands, where it can be viewed alongside the Golden Gate Bridge.

== History ==
Number of buildings by height in San Francisco by the end of each year. Click on the legend to toggle a specific height on or off. View chart definition.

California's first skyscraper was the 218-foot (66 m) Chronicle Building in San Francisco, which was completed in 1890. M. H. de Young, owner of the San Francisco Chronicle, commissioned Burnham and Root to design a signature tower to convey the power of his newspaper. Not to be outdone, de Young's rival, industrialist Claus Spreckels, purchased the San Francisco Call in 1895 and commissioned a tower of his own that would dwarf the Chronicle Building. The 315-foot (96 m) Call Building was completed in 1898 and stood across Market Street from the Chronicle Building. The Call Building (later named the Spreckels Building, and Central Tower today) would remain the city's tallest for nearly a quarter century.

Both steel-framed structures survived the 1906 earthquake, demonstrating that tall buildings could be safely constructed in earthquake country. Other early twentieth-century skyscrapers above 200 feet (61 m) include the Merchants Exchange Building (1903), Humboldt Bank Building (1908), Hobart Building (1914), and Southern Pacific Building (1916). Another skyscraper boom took hold during the 1920s, when several Neo-Gothic and Art Deco high rises, reaching three to four hundred feet (90 to 120 m) in height, were constructed, including the Standard Oil Building (1922), Pacific Telephone Building (1925), Russ Building (1927), Hunter-Dulin Building (1927), 450 Sutter Medical Building (1929), Shell Building (1929), and McAllister Tower (1930).

The Great Depression and World War II halted any further skyscraper construction until the 1950s when the Equitable Life Building (1955) and Crown-Zellerbach Building (1959) were completed. Many of San Francisco's tallest buildings, particularly its office skyscrapers, were completed in a building boom from the late 1960s until the late 1980s. During the 1960s, at least 40 new skyscrapers were built, and the Hartford Building (1965), 44 Montgomery (1967), Bank of America Center (1969), and Transamerica Pyramid (1972) each, in turn, took the title of the tallest building in California upon completion. At 853 feet (260 m) tall, the Transamerica Pyramid was one of the most controversial, with critics suggesting that it be torn down even before it was completed.

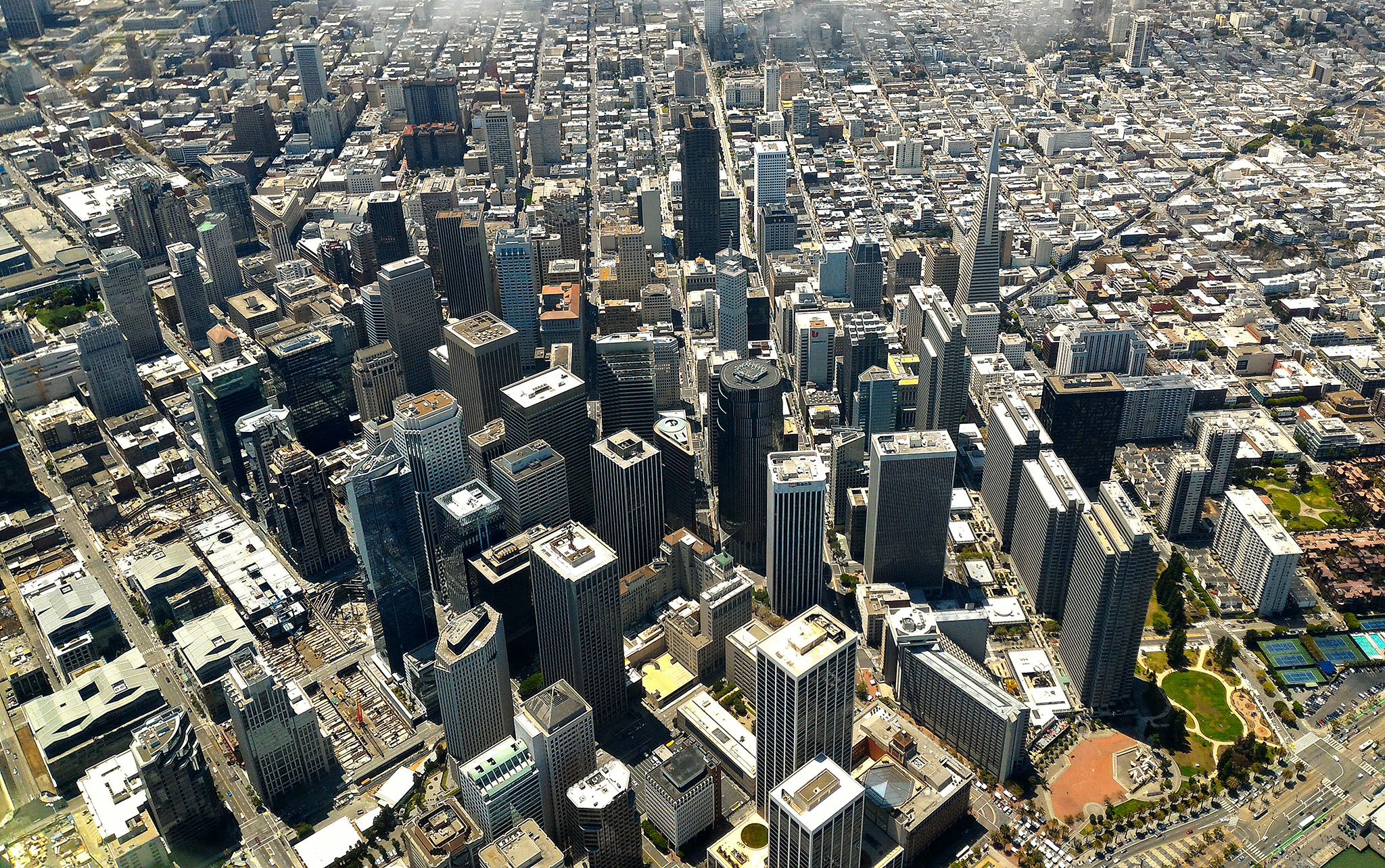
Aerial photo of downtown San Francisco, 2015. The Transamerica Pyramid is visible on the right. The foundation of the Salesforce Tower is visible on the lower left.

This surge of construction was dubbed "Manhattanization" by opponents and led to local legislation that set some of the strictest building height limits and regulations in the country. In 1985, San Francisco adopted the Downtown Plan, which slowed development in the Financial District north of Market Street and directed it to the area South of Market around the Transbay Terminal. Over 250 historic buildings were protected from development and developers were required to set aside open space for new projects. To prevent excessive growth and smooth the boom-and-bust building cycle, the Plan included an annual limit of 950,000 square feet (88,000 m^{2}) for new office development, although it grandfathered millions of square feet of proposals already in the development pipeline. In response, voters approved Proposition M in November 1986 that reduced the annual limit to 475,000 square feet (44,100 m^{2}) until the grandfathered square footage was accounted for, which occurred in 1999.

These limits, combined with the early 1990s recession, led to a significant slowdown of skyscraper construction during the late 1980s and 1990s. To guide new development, the city passed several neighborhood plans, such as the Rincon Hill Plan in 2005 and Transit Center District Plan in 2012, which allow taller skyscrapers in certain specific locations in the South of Market area. Since the early 2000s, the city has been undergoing another building boom, with numerous buildings over 400 feet (122 m) proposed, approved, or under construction; some, such as the two-towered One Rincon Hill and mixed-use 181 Fremont, have been completed. Multiple skyscrapers have been constructed near the new Salesforce Transit Center, including Salesforce Tower, which topped-out in 2017 at a height of 1,070 feet (330 m). This building is the first supertall skyscraper in San Francisco and among the tallest in the United States.

== Map of tallest buildings ==
The map below shows the location of buildings taller than 300 feet (91.4 m) in San Francisco. Each marker is numbered by height and colored by the decade of the building's completion.

Buildings taller than 300 ft (91 m) in San Francisco.
- 1950s and before
- 1960s
- 1970s
- 1980s
- 1990s
- 2000s
- 2010s
- 2020s
1 Salesforce Tower
2 Transamerica Pyramid
3 181 Fremont
4 555 California Street
5 345 California Center
6 Millennium Tower
7 The Avery
8 Park Tower at Transbay
9 One Rincon Hill
10 101 California Street
11 Salesforce West
12 575 Market Street
13 Four Embarcadero Center
14 One Embarcadero Center
15 44 Montgomery Street
16 Spear Tower
17 One Sansome Street
18 The Harrison
19 One Front Street
20 McKesson Plaza
21 First Market Tower
22 425 Market Street
23 Four Seasons Private Residences at 706 Mission Street
24 One Montgomery Tower
25 333 Bush Street
26 Hilton San Francisco Union Square
27 Pacific Gas & Electric Building
28 50 California Street
29 555 Mission Street
30 St. Regis Museum Tower
31 100 Pine Center
32 45 Fremont Street
33 333 Market Street
34 650 California Street
35 100 First Plaza
36 340 Fremont Street
37 One California
38 San Francisco Marriott Marquis
39 140 New Montgomery
40 Russ Building
41 500 Folsom
42 415 Natoma Street
43 Jasper
44 MIRA
45 505 Montgomery Street
46 Fifteen Fifty
47 JPMorgan Chase Building
48 The Infinity II
49 The Paramount
50 Providian Financial Building
51 Two Embarcadero Center
52 Three Embarcadero Center
53 350 Mission Street
54 595 Market Street
55 123 Mission Street
56 101 Montgomery
57 275 Battery Street
58 100 Van Ness Avenue
59 Westin-St. Francis Hotel Tower
60 LUMINA I
61 399 Fremont Street
62 One Maritime Plaza
63 Four Seasons Hotel & Residences
64 8 NEMA
65 33 New Montgomery
66 Spera SF
67 535 Mission Street
68 Shell Building
69 456 Montgomery Street
70 388 Market Street
71 Hyatt Regency San Francisco Downtown SOMA
72 222 Second Street
73 San Francisco Hilton Hotel Financial District
74 199 Fremont Street
75 Steuart Tower
76 88 Kearny Street
77 Two Transamerica Plaza
78 180 Montgomery Street
79 425 California Street
80 100 Montgomery Street
81 Grand Hyatt San Francisco
82 101 Second Street
83 Fox Plaza
84 580 California Street
85 450 Sutter Street
86 Parc 55 San Francisco
87 The Infinity I
88 LUMINA II
89 601 California Street
90 Hilton San Francisco Union Square Tower II
91 135 Main Street
92 The InterContinental San Francisco
93 71 Stevenson Street
94 Bridgeview
95 Royal Towers Apartments
96 KPMG Building
97 150 California Street
98 San Francisco Marriott Union Square
99 225 Bush Street
100 50 Beale Street
101 Fairmont San Francisco
102 Union Bank Building
103 235 Pine Street
104 Hunter-Dulin Building
105 Central Plaza
106 Beacon Grand Hotel
107 The Summit
108 1455 Market Street
109 W San Francisco
110 Bank of California Building
111 353 Sacramento Street
112 Philip Burton Federal Building
113 Ritz Carlton Residence Club
114 555 Market Street
115 McAllister Tower Apartments
116 Bank of America Center - Annex Building
117 One Bush Plaza
118 215-245 Market Street
119 301 Howard Street
120 Mark Hopkins Hotel
121 Trinity Place Building A
122 Mills Tower
123 Montgomery - Washington Tower
124 299 Fremont

== Cityscape ==
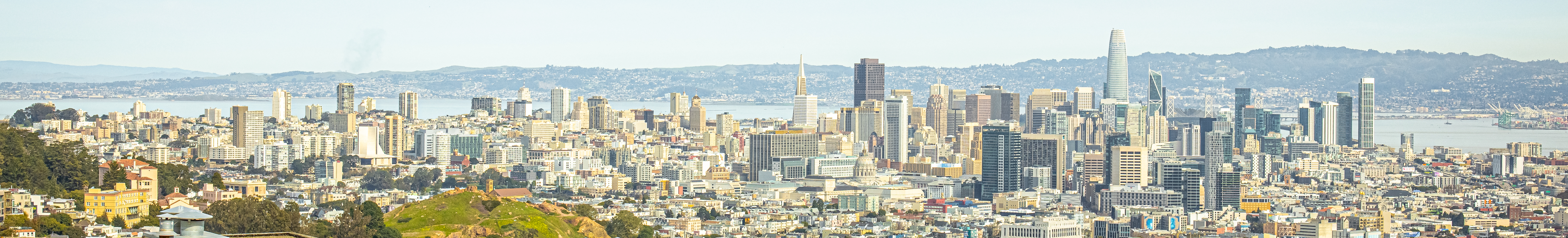
San Francisco from the Twin Peaks in 2025

== Tallest buildings ==
This list ranks San Francisco skyscrapers that stand at least 300 feet (91 m) tall, based on standard height measurement. This includes spires and architectural details but does not include antenna masts. The "Year" column indicates the year in which a building was completed. Buildings tied in height are sorted by year of completion, and then alphabetically.

Was the tallest building in San Francisco upon completion

Rank	Name	Image	Location	Height ft (m)	Floors	Year	Purpose	Notes
1	Salesforce Tower		37°47′24″N 122°23′49″W	1,070 (326)	61	2018	Office	18th-tallest building in the United States; 2nd-tallest building in California; Tallest building in San Francisco since 2018; Tallest building constructed in San Francisco in the 2010s
2	Transamerica Pyramid		37°47′43″N 122°24′10″W	853 (260)	48	1972	Office	5th-tallest building in California; Tallest building in San Francisco from 1972 until 2018, when Salesforce Tower was topped-off.; Tallest building on the West Coast from 1972 until 1974; Tallest building constructed in San Francisco in the 1970s
3	181 Fremont		37°47′23″N 122°23′43″W	810 (246.9)	56	2018	Mixed-use	2nd-tallest mixed-use residential building west of the Mississippi River.; Mixed-use hotel and residential building.
4	555 California Street		37°47′32″N 122°24′14″W	779 (237.4)	52	1969	Office	Tallest building in San Francisco and on the West Coast from 1969 to 1972; Tallest building constructed in the city in the 1960s; Formerly known as Bank of America Center; Largest office building in San Francisco by floor area.
5	345 California Center		37°47′33″N 122°24′02″W	695 (211.8)	48	1986	Mixed-use	Mixed-use hotel and office building.; Tallest mid-block skyscraper in San Francisco; Tallest building constructed in the city in the 1980s; The height shown includes flagpoles.
6	Millennium Tower		37°47′26″N 122°23′46″W	645 (196.6)	58	2009	Residential	Tallest building constructed in the city in the 2000s.; The Millennium Tower has tilted up to 2 inches a year and has sunk as much as 3 inches per year.
7	The Avery		37°47′16″N 122°23′40″W	618 (188.4)	56	2019	Residential	
8	Park Tower at Transbay		37°47′25″N 122°23′39″W	605 (184.5)	43	2018	Office	
9	One Rincon Hill		37°47′09″N 122°23′32″W	605 (184.4)	54	2008	Residential	Originally known as One Rincon Hill South Tower.; Tallest entirely residential building in the city from 2008 to 2019.
10	101 California Street		37°47′34″N 122°23′53″W	600 (183)	48	1982	Office	
11	Salesforce West		37°47′26″N 122°23′50″W	600 (183)	43	1985	Office	Previously known as 50 Fremont Center.
12	575 Market Street		37°47′22″N 122°24′01″W	573 (174.7)	40	1975	Office	Formerly Standard Oil Buildings and later the Chevron Towers. Part of the Market Center.
13	Four Embarcadero Center		37°47′43″N 122°23′46″W	570 (173.7)	45	1984	Office	
14	One Embarcadero Center		37°47′40″N 122°23′59″W	569 (173.4)	45	1970	Office	
15	44 Montgomery Street		37°47′23″N 122°24′07″W	565 (172.3)	43	1967	Office	Tallest building in San Francisco and California from 1967 to 1969
16	Spear Tower		37°47′36″N 122°23′40″W	564 (172)	42	1976	Office	Part of One Market Plaza.
17	One Sansome Street		37°47′26″N 122°24′05″W	550 (168)	43	1984	Office	Also known as the Citigroup Center
18	The Harrison		37°47′11″N 122°23′31″W	541 (165)	45	2014	Residential	Originally known as One Rincon Hill North Tower.
19	One Front Street		37°47′31″N 122°23′56″W	538 (164)	38	1982	Office	Also known as Shaklee Terraces and 444 Market Street
20	McKesson Plaza		37°47′20″N 122°24′10″W	529 (161.2)	38	1969	Office	Also known as One Post Street.
21	First Market Tower		37°47′26″N 122°23′57″W	529 (161.2)	38	1972	Office	
22	425 Market Street		37°47′28″N 122°23′53″W	524 (159.7)	38	1973	Office	
23	Four Seasons Private Residences at 706 Mission Street		37°47′10″N 122°24′10″W	510 (155.5)	43	2020	Mixed-use	Mixed-use residential and museum building. Permanent home of the Mexican Museum, located in the bottom four floors.
24	One Montgomery Tower		37°47′21″N 122°24′12″W	500 (152.4)	38	1982	Office	Formerly the Pacific Telesis Tower. Part of the Post Montgomery Center complex. From 2017 to 2024, the Wikimedia Foundation was headquartered on the sixteenth floor.
25	333 Bush Street		37°47′26″N 122°24′11″W	495 (150.9)	43	1986	Mixed-use	Mixed-use office and residential building.
26	Hilton San Francisco Union Square		37°47′07″N 122°24′39″W	493 (150.3)	46	1971	Hotel	Tallest building used exclusively as a hotel in the city
27	Pacific Gas & Electric Building		37°47′30″N 122°23′45″W	492 (150)	34	1971	Office	In September 2021, it was proposed that the building be reskinned for $106 million and be addressed as 200 Mission Street (now 77 Beale Street).
28	50 California Street		37°47′39″N 122°23′51″W	487 (148.4)	37	1972	Office	Also known as Union Bank Building
29	555 Mission Street		37°47′19″N 122°23′55″W	487 (148.4)	33	2008	Office	Tallest office building completed in the 2000s
30	St. Regis Museum Tower		37°47′11″N 122°24′05″W	484 (147.5)	42	2005	Mixed-use	Mixed-use hotel and residential building.
31	100 Pine Center		37°47′33″N 122°23′56″W	476 (145.1)	34	1972	Office	
32	45 Fremont Street		37°47′28″N 122°23′50″W	476 (145)	34	1979	Office	Also known as the Bechtel Building
33	333 Market Street		37°47′31″N 122°23′51″W	472 (144)	33	1979	Office	
34	650 California Street		37°47′34″N 122°24′19″W	466 (142)	33	1964	Office	Tallest building in California from 1965 to 1967. Also known as the Hartford Building
35	100 First Plaza		37°47′21″N 122°23′51″W	447 (136.2)	27	1988	Office	Also known as Delta Dental Tower
36	340 Fremont Street		37°47′13″N 122°23′34″W	440 (134.1)	40	2016	Residential	
37	One California		37°47′36″N 122°23′50″W	438 (133.5)	32	1969	Office	
38	San Francisco Marriott Marquis		37°47′07″N 122°24′15″W	436 (132.9)	39	1989	Hotel	
39	140 New Montgomery		37°47′12″N 122°24′00″W	435 (132.7)	26	1925	Office	Tallest building completed in San Francisco in the 1920s; Originally called the Pacific Telephone Building
40	Russ Building		37°47′29″N 122°24′10″W	435 (132.6)	32	1927	Office	Second tallest building completed in San Francisco in the 1920s
41	500 Folsom		37°47′14″N 122°23′42″W	435 (132.6)	42	2019	Residential	
42	415 Natoma Street		37°46′53″N 122°24′21″W	435 (132.6)	25	2022	Office	
43	Jasper		37°47′09″N 122°23′38″W	430 (131)	39	2015	Residential	
44	MIRA		37°47′24″N 122°23′29″W	427 (130)	39	2020	Residential	
45	505 Montgomery Street		37°47′38″N 122°24′12″W	425 (129.5)	24	1988	Office	
46	Fifteen Fifty		37°46′26″N 122°25′06″W	422 (128.6)	37	2020	Residential	Also known as 1550 Mission Street
47	JPMorgan Chase Building		37°47′20″N 122°23′58″W	420 (128)	31	2002	Office	
48	The Infinity II		37°47′22″N 122°23′26″W	420 (128)	41	2009	Residential	
49	The Paramount		37°47′12″N 122°24′07″W	418 (127.4)	40	2002	Residential	
50	Providian Financial Building		37°47′28″N 122°23′42″W	417 (127)	30	1983	Office	Also known as the Pacific Gateway Building
51	Two Embarcadero Center		37°47′42″N 122°23′55″W	413 (126)	31	1974	Office	
52	Three Embarcadero Center		37°47′42″N 122°23′51″W	413 (126)	31	1976	Office	
53	350 Mission Street		37°47′27″N 122°23′48″W	413 (125.9)	27	2015	Office	Also known as Salesforce East.
54	595 Market Street		37°47′21″N 122°24′03″W	410 (125)	30	1979	Office	
55	123 Mission Street		37°47′31″N 122°23′40″W	407 (124)	29	1986	Office	
56	101 Montgomery		37°47′26″N 122°24′09″W	404 (123)	28	1984	Office	
57	275 Battery Street		37°47′38″N 122°24′02″W	404 (123)	33	1989	Office	Also known as Embarcadero Center West or Embarcadero West
58	100 Van Ness Avenue		37°46′36″N 122°25′09″W	400 (122)	30	1974	Residential	Originally completed as an office tower in 1974 as the California Automobile Association Building. Renovated as a residential tower in 2015.
59	Westin-St. Francis Hotel Tower		37°47′16″N 122°24′34″W	400 (121.9)	32	1972	Hotel	
60	LUMINA I		37°47′19″N 122°23′32″W	400 (121.9)	42	2015	Residential	
61	399 Fremont Street		37°47′14″N 122°23′32″W	400 (121.9)	42	2016	Residential	
62	One Maritime Plaza		37°47′44″N 122°23′57″W	398 (121.3)	25	1967	Office	
63	Four Seasons Hotel & Residences		37°47′11″N 122°24′16″W	398 (121.3)	40	2001	Mixed-use	Mixed-use hotel and residential building
64	8 NEMA	–	37°46′34″N 122°25′03″W	387 (118)	37	2014	Residential	Also known as NEMA North Tower.
65	33 New Montgomery	–	37°47′19″N 122°24′05″W	382 (116.5)	21	1986	Office	
66	Spera SF		37°47′14″N 122°23′47″W	380 (115.8)	35	2017	Residential	Also known as 33 Tehama.
67	535 Mission Street		37°47′20″N 122°23′53″W	379 (115.4)	26	2015	Office	
68	Shell Building		37°47′29″N 122°24′00″W	378 (115.2)	29	1929	Office	
69	456 Montgomery Street		37°47′37″N 122°24′10″W	378 (115.2)	26	1986	Office	
70	388 Market Street		37°47′32″N 122°23′53″W	375 (114.3)	26	1985	Office	
71	Hyatt Regency San Francisco Downtown SOMA	–	37°47′12″N 122°24′11″W	374 (114)	34	1984	Hotel	Formerly The Westin San Francisco Market Street
72	222 Second Street		37°47′11″N 122°23′54″W	370 (112.8)	26	2015	Office	
73	San Francisco Hilton Hotel Financial District	–	37°47′43″N 122°24′15″W	365 (111.3)	30	1971	Hotel	Also known as SF Chinese Cultural Center
74	199 Fremont Street		37°47′24″N 122°23′41″W	365 (111.3)	27	2000	Office	
75	Steuart Tower		37°47′36″N 122°23′38″W	364 (111)	27	1976	Office	
76	88 Kearny Street		37°47′19″N 122°24′12″W	363 (110.6)	22	1986	Office	
77	Two Transamerica Plaza	–	37°47′42″N 122°24′07″W	362 (110.3)	20	1980	Office	
78	180 Montgomery Street		37°47′27″N 122°24′07″W	360 (109.8)	25	1979	Office	Also known as Bank of the West Building
79	425 California Street		37°47′34″N 122°24′05″W	359 (109.4)	27	1967	Office	
80	100 Montgomery Street		37°47′25″N 122°24′07″W	356 (108.5)	25	1955	Office	Also known as the Equitable Life Building.
81	Grand Hyatt San Francisco		37°47′21″N 122°24′26″W	355 (108.2)	35	1972	Hotel	
82	101 Second Street		37°47′17″N 122°23′57″W	354 (108)	26	1999	Office	
83	Fox Plaza		37°46′37″N 122°25′04″W	354 (107.9)	29	1967	Mixed-use	Mixed-use residential and office building
84	580 California Street		37°47′35″N 122°24′15″W	351 (107)	23	1984	Office	
85	450 Sutter Street		37°47′22″N 122°24′28″W	350 (106.7)	26	1929	Office	
86	Parc 55 San Francisco		37°47′06″N 122°24′32″W	350 (106.7)	32	1984	Hotel	
87	The Infinity I		37°47′22″N 122°23′29″W	350 (106.7)	35	2008	Residential	
88	LUMINA II		37°47′19″N 122°23′29″W	350 (106.7)	37	2015	Residential	
89	601 California Street		37°47′32″N 122°24′17″W	349 (106.4)	22	1960	Office	Also known as the International Building
90	Hilton San Francisco Union Square Tower II	–	37°47′09″N 122°24′39″W	348 (106)	23	1987	Hotel	
91	135 Main Street	–	37°47′30″N 122°23′39″W	340 (103.6)	22	1990	Office	
92	The InterContinental San Francisco		37°46′55″N 122°24′17″W	340 (103.6)	31	2008	Hotel	
93	71 Stevenson Street	–	37°47′22″N 122°23′59″W	338 (103)	26	1986	Office	Also known as Stevenson Place
94	Bridgeview	–	37°47′13″N 122°23′28″W	333 (101.4)	26	2002	Residential	
95	Royal Towers Apartments	–	37°47′55″N 122°24′47″W	330 (100.6)	24	1964	Residential	
96	KPMG Building		37°47′19″N 122°24′01″W	330 (100.6)	25	2002	Office	Also known by its street address, 55 Second Street.
97	150 California Street		37°47′37″N 122°23′54″W	330 (100.6)	23	1999	Office	
98	San Francisco Marriott Union Square		37°47′22″N 122°24′30″W	329 (100.3)	29	1972	Hotel	
99	225 Bush Street		37°47′27″N 122°24′05″W	328 (100)	22	1922	Office	
100	50 Beale Street		37°47′29″N 122°23′48″W	328 (100)	23	1967	Office	Also known as the Bechtel Building and the Blue Shield of California Building.
101	Fairmont San Francisco	–	37°47′34″N 122°24′35″W	325 (99.1)	29	1961	Hotel	
102	Union Bank Building	–	37°47′36″N 122°24′03″W	325 (99)	23	1977	Office	
103	235 Pine Street		37°47′31″N 122°24′01″W	324 (98.8)	26	1990	Office	
104	Hunter-Dulin Building		37°47′23″N 122°24′09″W	323 (98.3)	22	1926	Office	
105	Central Plaza		37°47′26″N 122°23′54″W	318 (96.9)	23	1987	Office	
106	Beacon Grand Hotel		37°47′20″N 122°24′30″W	315 (96)	22	1928	Hotel	Opened as, and also known as, the Sir Francis Drake Hotel.
107	The Summit		37°47′54″N 122°24′55″W	315 (96)	32	1965	Residential	
108	1455 Market Street		37°46′32″N 122°25′04″W	315 (96)	21	1977	Office	
109	W San Francisco		37°47′08″N 122°24′01″W	315 (96)	33	1999	Hotel	
110	Bank of California Building		37°47′36″N 122°24′06″W	314 (95.7)	21	1967	Office	
111	353 Sacramento Street		37°47′38″N 122°23′59″W	313 (95.4)	23	1983	Office	
112	Philip Burton Federal Building		37°46′55″N 122°25′05″W	312 (95.1)	21	1959	Mixed-use	Mixed-use office and government building
113	Ritz Carlton Residence Club		37°47′18″N 122°24′12″W	312 (95.1)	24	2006	Mixed-use	Mixed-use residential and hotel building. A renovation of the Chronicle Building, considered the first high-rise in San Francisco. 14 new floors were buitl on top of the original ten in 2006.
114	555 Market Street		37°47′24″N 122°24′00″W	311 (94.8)	22	1964	Office	
115	McAllister Tower Apartments		37°46′52″N 122°24′50″W	310 (94.5)	28	1930	Residential	
116	Bank of America Center - Annex Building	–	37°47′32″N 122°24′11″W	309 (94.2)	16	1923	Office	
117	One Bush Plaza		37°47′28″N 122°24′00″W	308 (93.9)	20	1959	Office	
118	215-245 Market Street	–	37°47′34″N 122°23′48″W	307 (93.5)	18	1925	Office	Formerly the headquarters of Pacific Gas & Electric
119	301 Howard Street		37°47′22″N 122°23′39″W	307 (93.5)	23	1988	Office	
120	Mark Hopkins Hotel		37°47′30″N 122°24′37″W	306 (93.3)	19	1926	Hotel	
121	Trinity Place Building A	–	37°46′42″N 122°24′46″W	305 (93)	25	2009	Residential	
122	Mills Tower		37°47′29″N 122°24′05″W	302 (92.1)	22	1931	Office	
123	Montgomery - Washington Tower		37°47′43″N 122°24′13″W	300 (91.5)	26	1984	Mixed-use	Mixed-use office and residential building
124	299 Fremont		37°47′18″N 122°23′37″W	300 (91.4)	25	2016	Residential	

== Tallest under construction, approved, or proposed ==
=== Under construction ===
As of 2026, there are no buildings expected to be 300 ft (91 m) or taller under construction in San Francisco.

=== On hold ===
This lists buildings that are on hold in San Francisco and were originally planned to rise at least 300 feet (91 m).

Name	Coordinates	Height ft (m)	Floors	Purpose	Notes
Fifty at First	37°47′24″N 122°23′53″W	915 (279)	56	Office	Will be the second-tallest building in San Francisco once completed, behind the Salesforce Tower.; Originally the Oceanwide Center, plans in September 2026 were made by the San Francisco Recovery Fund for a redesigned 56-story office tower; Oceanwide Center Tower 2 has not been planned to be revised, and so far is considered an abandoned project
30 Van Ness	37°46′32.4″N 122°25′08.5″W	540 (165)	47	Mixed-use	Mixed-use office and residential building.; Construction is on hold since August 2023.

=== Approved ===
This lists buildings that are approved in San Francisco and are planned to rise at least 300 feet (91 m). Table entries with dashes (—) indicate that information regarding building floor counts or dates of completion has not yet been released.

Name	Height	Floors	Year (est.)	Notes
530 Howard Street	843 (257)	72	—	This project contains 882,250 square feet, with 730,975 square feet for housing and 48,000 square feet for parking. Once complete, the tower will contain 672 apartments.; Approved on October 24, 2024.
10 South Van Ness	820 (250)	67	2027	Developer: Crescent Heights; Architect: Arcadis; Construction expected to begin the beginning of 2027. When completed it will become the city's 3rd tallest building.
550 Howard Street (Parcel F)	806 (246)	61	—	Approved in March 2021; The project contains 325,000 sqft of office space, 165 condos and 180 hotel rooms by Rosewood Hotels and Resorts.; Developed by a joint venture with Hines, Urban Pacific, and Goldman Sachs Asset Management and designed by Pelli Clarke Pelli Architects.
45 Third Street	600 (183)	52	—	Design by Skidmore Owings & Merrill; The development is sponsored by Hearst and JMA Ventures.
88 Bluxome Street	599 (183)	58	—	Approved December 2025.; Project will rise at the site of the former San Francisco Tennis Club.; The development will construct 1,500 apartments across two towers in addition to ground level retail.
530 Sansome Street	574 (175)	41	—	Proposed in August 2024 by Related Companies as a mixed-use office and hotel development; To be built on the current site of San Francisco Fire Department Station 13; as part of the project, a new station would be constructed at 447 Battery Street.; Approved in October 2025
200 Main Street (Transbay Block 4)	513 (156)	47	—	Hines is the property owner and Solomon Cordwell Buenz is the designer.
5M Development – N1 Tower	470 (143)	40	—	Along with H1, N2 and M2 towers, this project is set on total 4 acres (1.6 ha) at Fifth and Mission.
95 Hawthorne Street	461 (141)	42	—	Approved in October 2019.; Designed by Skidmore, Owings & Merrill (SOM)
180 Hawthorne Street	444 (135)	40	—	Both proposed and approved in 2024
655 4th Street	440 (134)	39	—	Approved in June 2019.; Developed by Tishman Speyer and designed by Bjarke Ingels Group; Tower A (37 floor and 400 ft high) and Tower B (39 floor and 440 ft high) .
One Oak	437 (133)	41	—	This project developed by The Emerald Fund will contain 541 condominiums.
98 Franklin Street	424 (129)	38	—	Approved in 2023.
555 Howard Street	405 (123)	36	—	This project includes 69 condominiums over a 255-room hotel.; The ultra-luxury hotel will be named Langham Place.
570 Market Street	320 (98)	29	—	Approved September 12th, 2025.; Plans for a 211 room boutique hotel.

=== Proposed ===
This lists buildings that are proposed in San Francisco and are planned to rise at least 300 feet (91 m). Table entries with dashes (—) indicate that information regarding building floor counts or dates of completion has not yet been released.

Name	Height ft (m)	Floors	Year (est.)	Notes
77 Beale Street	1,225–1,300 (373–396)	76	—	Proposed in July 2025 by Hines. If built, it would become the tallest building in San Francisco. It would also be the tallest building in the United States outside of New York City or Chicago.; Plans for a spire up to 75 feet could raise the height of the skyscraper to 1,300 feet (396 meters), making 77 Beale rise 230 feet above the current tallest skyscraper in San Francisco, Salesforce Tower.
Railyards at 4th and Kings	850 (259)	—	—	Planned to be the tallest tower of the San Francisco Railyards development; Residential development
536 Mission Street	752 (229)	—	—	Height provided is a lower estimate. The other plan option calls for 752 ft tall office building.; Official definitive height not yet stated
Railyards at 7th	700 (213)	46	—	Planned to be the second tallest tower of the San Francisco Railyards development
The Cube (620 Folsom Street)	663 (202)	62	—	Applied by Ground Matrix in August 2021.; Designed by Arquitectonica and applied by Align Real Estate.
Flower Market Redevelopment	600 (182)			
501 Brannan Street	553 (168)	49		
Central SOMA Tower (636–648 4th Street)	517 (158)	47	—	SF Planning Department made initial feedback in March 2023.
395 3rd Street	480 (146)	45	—	Planned residential high rise by Strada Investment Group; In September 2026, the planned height was risen from 35 to 45 floors
1601 Mission Street	479 (146)	45	—	Proposed on October 8th, 2026; Designed by Solomon Cordwell Buenz; Proposes 528 apartments and mixed-use ground-floor retail
325 Fremont Street	467 (142)	45		
180 Hawthorne Street	444 (135)	40	—	Proposed in 2024
38 8th Street	433 (131)	40	—	Designed by Handel Architects; Proposed August 2026
1301 Van Ness Avenue	390 (118)	36		
598 Bryant Street	355 (108)	33	—	Proposed in 2024. Environmental review approved February 2026.; Will contain 395 apartments, 3,750 square feet of ground-level retail, and 2,900 square feet for the 32-car parking garage, which will use stackers.

== Timeline of tallest buildings ==
This lists buildings that once held the title of tallest building in San Francisco as well as the current titleholder, the Salesforce Tower.

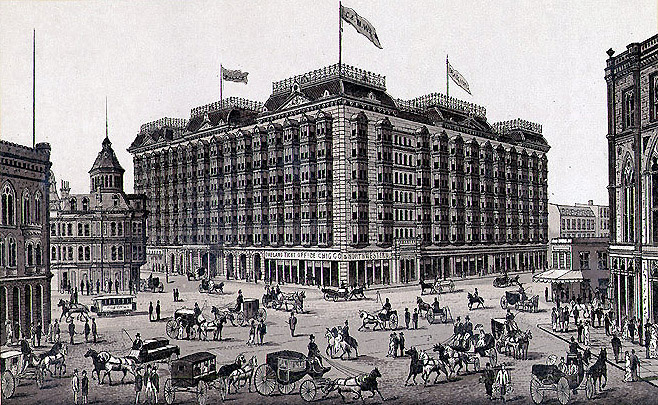
The original Palace Hotel stood as San Francisco's tallest building from 1875 until 1890.

Name	Image	Street address	Years as tallest	Height ft (m)	Floors	Notes
Montgomery Block		628 Montgomery Street	1853–1854	~50 (15)	4	
Old Saint Mary's Cathedral		660 California Street	1854–1875	90 (27)	1	
Palace Hotel		2 New Montgomery Street	1875–1890	120 (37)	7	(Note: The original Palace Hotel burned down in 1906.)
Chronicle Building		690 Market Street	1890–1898	218 (66)	10	
Call Building		703 Market Street	1898–1922	315 (96)	15	(Note: The Call Building was renamed the Spreckels Building in 1913 and was heavily modified in 1938, lowering its height to 299 feet (91 m).)
225 Bush Street		225 Bush Street	1922–1925	328 (100)	22	
140 New Montgomery		140 New Montgomery Street	1925–1964	435 (133)	26	(Note: The Russ Building, completed in 1927, was only a few inches (0.1 meters) taller than the height of the Pacific Telephone Building. The two buildings can be considered to be tied for the title of San Francisco's tallest building, which they held until 1964.)
650 California Street		650 California Street	1964–1967	466 (142)	33	(Note: This building was constructed as the Hartford Building, but is now more commonly known as 650 California Street.)
44 Montgomery Street		44 Montgomery Street	1967–1969	565 (172)	43	
555 California Street		555 California Street	1969–1972	779 (237)	52	(Note: This building was constructed as the Bank of America Center, but was renamed to 555 California Street in 2005.)
Transamerica Pyramid		600 Montgomery Street	1972–2018	853 (260)	48	
Salesforce Tower		415 Mission Street	2018–present	1,070 (326)	61	
