= Pacific Gas & Electric Building =

Skyscraper in San Francisco

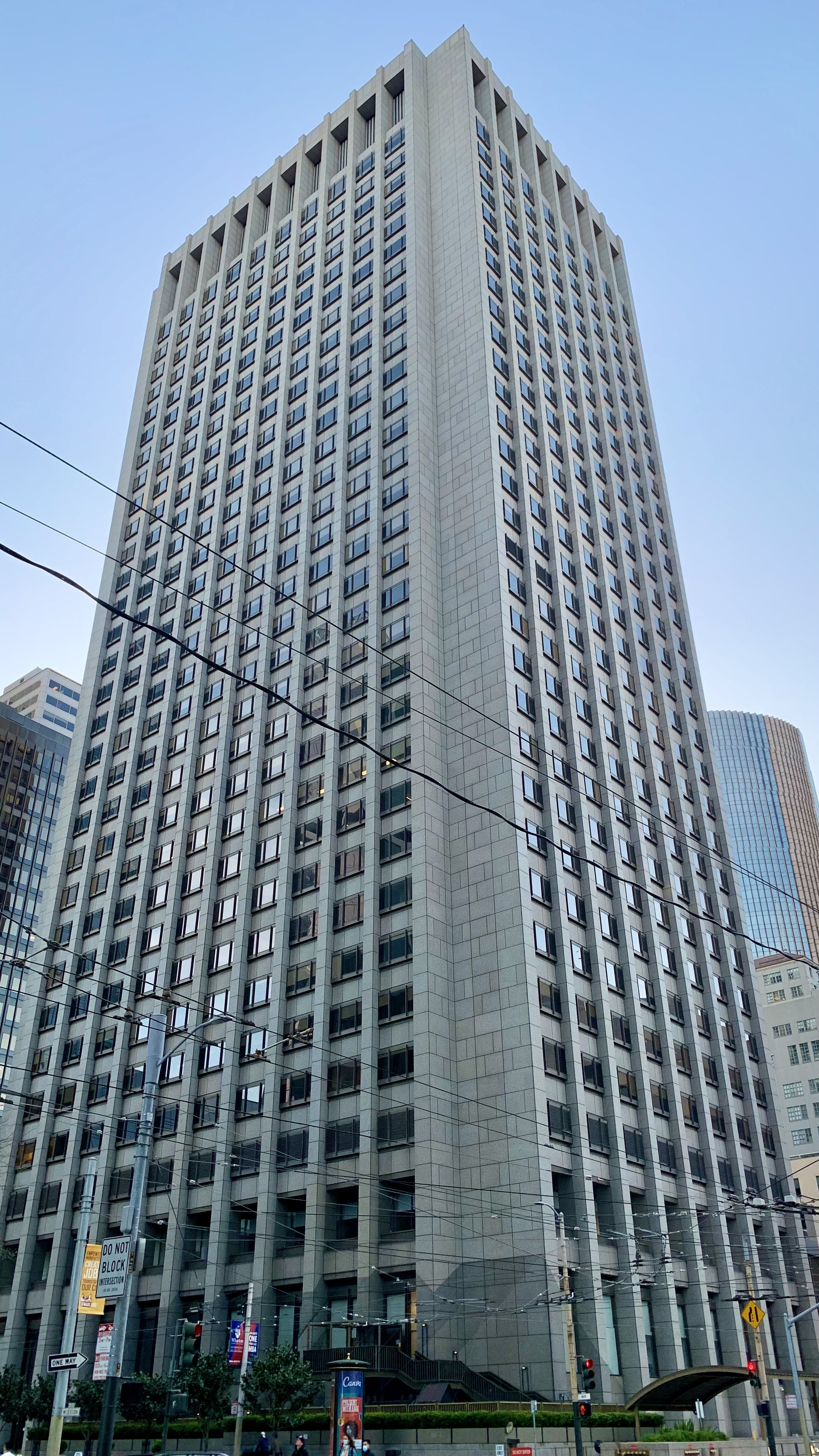
- In 2021

- Location within San Francisco Location within California Location within the United States
- Alternative names: Former PG&E Building; Former PG&E Headquarters

General information
- Type: Commercial offices
- Location: 77 Beale Street; San Francisco, California
- Coordinates: 37.7916°N 122.3958°W
- Completed: 1971

Height
- Roof: 149.96 m (492.0 ft)

Technical details
- Floor count: 34

Design and construction
- Architects: Hertzka & Knowles
- Structural engineer: H.J. Brunnier Associates; Ben C. Gerwick, Inc.
- Main contractor: Hathaway Dinwiddie

The Pacific Gas & Electric Building is a steel frame 150 m (490 ft) skyscraper located at 77 Beale Street (at Mission) in the financial district of San Francisco, California. Completed in 1971, the 34-story building was formerly the headquarters for Pacific Gas and Electric Company, the main utility provider for Northern California and parts of Southern California, and has been host to a nesting pair of peregrine falcons since 1987.

== History ==
In June 2020, Pacific Gas & Electric announced that it would move its headquarters to the Kaiser Center in Oakland. The move will happen in phases, starting in 2022 and completing by 2026.

In May 2021, Hines agreed to purchase the building for US$800 million. They proposed its address to be 200 Mission Street (instead of 77 Beale Street).

In July 2025, Hines proposed replacing the Pacific Gas & Electric Building with a new 1,225-foot office tower that would be the tallest building in San Francisco, surpassing the Salesforce Tower. It would also be the tallest building in the United States outside of New York City and Chicago.

== See also ==
- Pacific Gas and Electric Company General Office Building and Annex
- List of tallest buildings in San Francisco
