= 100 Pine Center =

Skyscraper in San Francisco

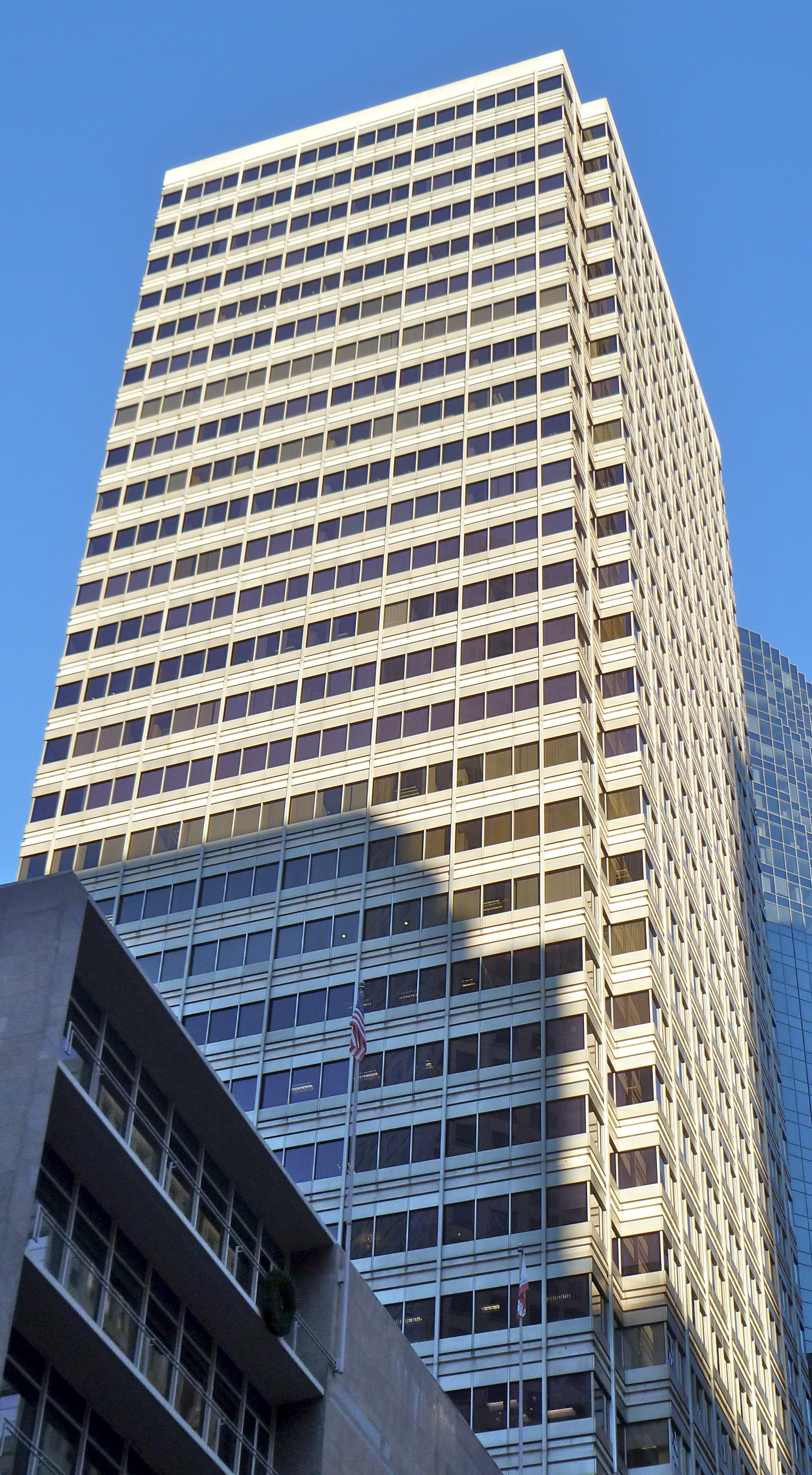

- Location within San Francisco
- Alternative names: 100 Pine Street; Continental Insurance Building

General information
- Type: Commercial offices
- Location: 100 Pine Street; San Francisco, California
- Coordinates: 37.7926°N 122.3989°W
- Completed: 1972
- Owner: Rockpoint Group

Height
- Roof: 145.09 m (476.0 ft)

Technical details
- Floor count: 33
- Floor area: 402,500 sq ft (37,390 m^{2})

Design and construction
- Architects: Hertzka and Knowles

100 Pine Center is a class-A office building at the northwest corner of Pine Street and Front Street in San Francisco's Financial District. The building is 145 m (476 ft) with 33 floors, and 402,500 sq ft (37,000 m^{2}) of rentable office space, a 150-car garage including 30 valet parking spaces.

Completed in 1972 as headquarters of the Continental Insurance Company, the building is among the earlier of San Francisco's modern skyscrapers. It is one of 39 San Francisco high rises reported by the U.S. Geological Survey as potentially vulnerable to a large earthquake, due to a flawed welding technique.

By the start of the dot-com bubble the property, then owned by Grosvenor Properties, was outdated and suffered from deferred capital maintenance.

In 1997, the building was purchased by Walton Capital, which invested heavily in upgrades, re-measured the building at 36,000 square feet (3,300 m^{2}) larger than before, then aggressively re-leased space at higher rates. After two failed transactions, Walton Capital sold the building to investors led by Unico Properties in May 2000 for US$156 million. Unico re-sold the property to the Alaska Permanent Fund based on a US$149 million price in August 2005, but retained a minority ownership share. The property was acquired by the Rockpoint Group in February 2017 for US$287.5 million.

== Tenants ==
The tower houses many daytime office workers. Major tenants include the New York Life Insurance Company. As of 2016, it is tied with 45 Fremont Center as the twenty-sixth tallest building in San Francisco. It was certified as being operated and maintained as a green building under the US Green Building Council's Leadership in Energy and Environmental Design for Existing Buildings (LEED EB 2.0) standards in July 2008.

The Consulate-General of Ireland is in the building.

== See also ==
- List of tallest buildings in San Francisco
