= 50 California Street =

Skyscraper in San Francisco

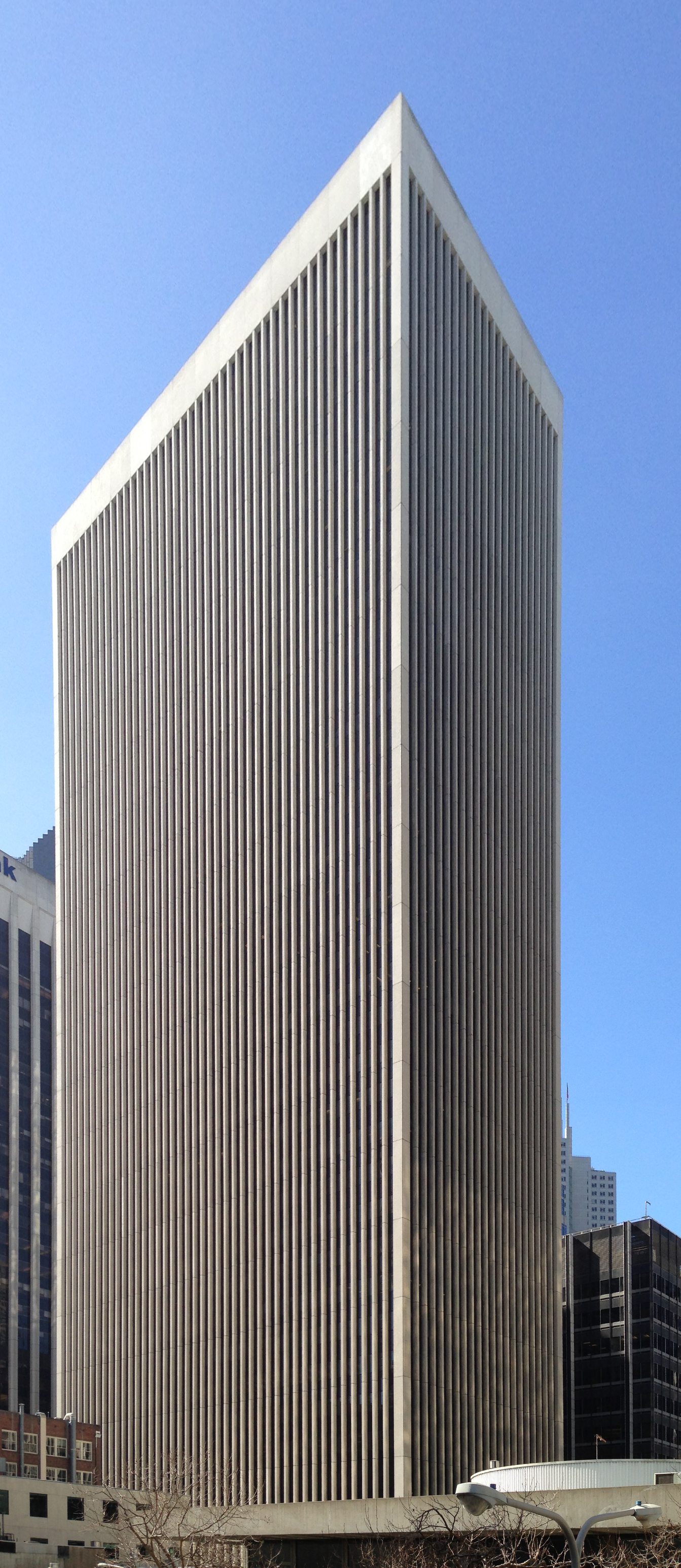

- Location within San Francisco
- Alternative names: Union Bank Building

General information
- Type: Commercial offices
- Location: 50 California Street; San Francisco, California
- Coordinates: 37.7940°N 122.3974°W
- Completed: 1972
- Owner: Shorenstein Properties
- Management: Shorenstein Properties

Height
- Roof: 148.44 m (487.0 ft)

Technical details
- Floor count: 37
- Floor area: 63,174 m^{2} (680,000 sq ft)
- Lifts/elevators: 17

Design and construction
- Architect: Welton Becket & Associates
- Developer: Haas & Haynie
- Main contractor: Dillingham Construction; Haas & Haynie

50 California Street (also known as the Union Bank Building) is a 148 m (486 ft), 37-story office tower completed in 1972 at the foot of California Street in the Financial District of San Francisco, California. There is a plaza located at the base of the building. The building is owned and managed by affiliates of Shorenstein Properties.

== Gallery ==
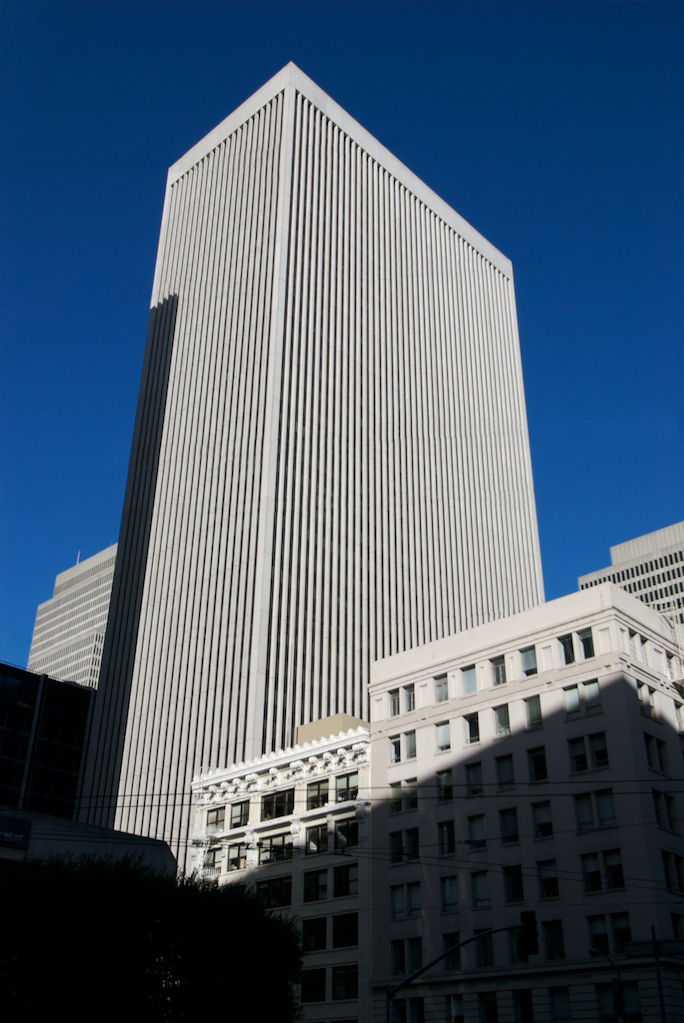

== Popular culture ==
The building is briefly featured in the 2014 science fiction monster film "Godzilla" where during the climax of the film, Godzilla and the male MUTO fought in San Francisco, only for Godzilla to kill the MUTO by slamming him into the side of the building, then the building collapses on top of Godzilla

== See also ==
- List of tallest buildings in San Francisco
