= 399 Fremont Street =

Residential skyscraper in San Francisco, U.S.

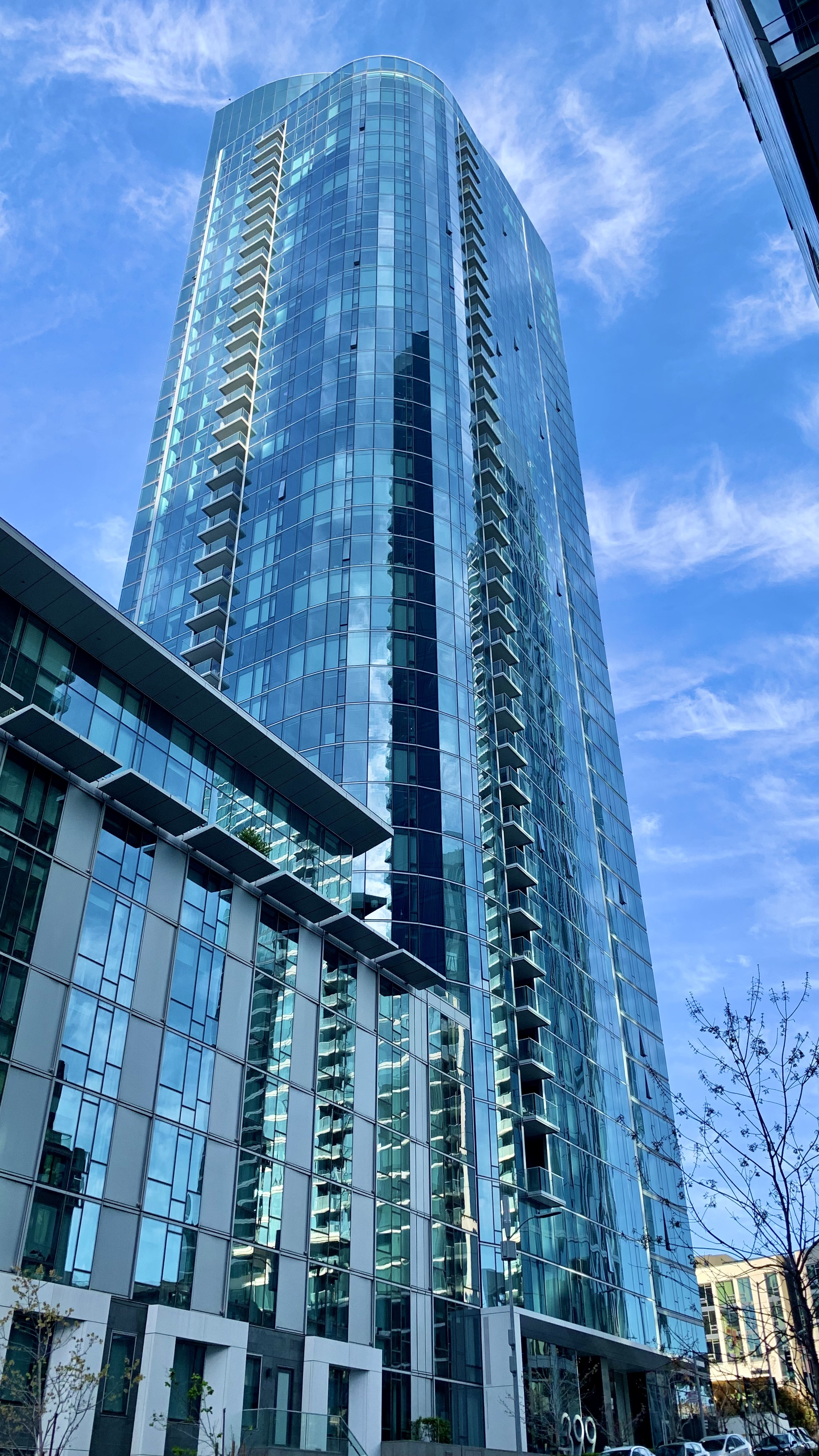
- In March 2021

- Location in San Francisco Location in California Location in United States
- Former names: The Californian on Rincon Hill; Echelon on Rincon Hill
- Alternative names: 375 Fremont Street

General information
- Status: Completed April 2016
- Type: Residential apartments
- Location: 355-399 Fremont Street; San Francisco, California
- Coordinates: 37.7872°N 122.3921°W
- Construction started: January 2014
- Estimated completion: April 2016
- Cost: US$317 million
- Owner: UDR, Inc. (51%); MetLife, Inc. (49%)

Height
- Roof: 122 m (400 ft)

Technical details
- Floor count: 42

Design and construction
- Architect: Solomon Cordwell Buenz
- Developer: UDR, Inc.
- Structural engineer: Magnusson Klemencic Associates
- Main contractor: Swinerton

Other information
- Number of units: 447

399 Fremont Street is a 122 m (400 ft) residential skyscraper in the Rincon Hill neighborhood of San Francisco, California. The tower has 447 residential units on 42 floors, and 25,000 sq ft (2,300 m^{2}) of amenity space.

== History ==
As part of the Rincon Hill Plan adopted in August 2005, the parcels at 375 Fremont and 399 Fremont were zoned for either two 250-foot (76 m) residential towers, or one 400-foot (120 m) tower. On June 15, 2006, the San Francisco Planning Commission approved the demolition of the existing buildings and the construction of a 400-foot (120 m) residential tower by developer Fifield Realty Corp.

Initially designed by Richard Keating Architecture, the development was approved for 432 residential units with 432 parking spaces in four underground levels. The project was marketed as The Californian on Rincon Hill by Fifield. By 2007, however, Fifield was reportedly looking to sell the development. Demolition of the existing buildings took place in February 2008. In 2009, Fifield changed the name of the project to Echelon on Rincon Hill.

After two years without starting construction, the Planning Commission granted a 12-month extension of its approvals until June 15, 2009. The extension also increased the number of allowed units to 452, while decreasing the number of parking spaces to 238. Additional 12-month extensions were granted in 2009, 2010, and 2011. In 2012, developers OliverMcMillan and UDR acquired the project from Fifield. After being redesigned by Solomon Cordwell Buenz, another 12-month extension was granted, expiring June 15, 2013. In January 2013, UDR acquired OliverMcMillan's remaining 7.5% stake in the project. The total cost of the land parcel was US$52.2 million. In December 2013, UDR announced a joint-venture agreement with MetLife to develop the US$317 million project, with UDR retaining a 51 percent ownership interest and MetLife owning 49 percent.

According to planning documents, the building will rise 400 ft (120 m) to the roof line, exclusive of mechanical screening structures, which makes the tower's total height somewhat taller. Building permits were issued in June 2013. Construction began in January 2014. General Contractor Swinerton, completed the building in April 2016. 399 Fremont is a luxury apartment home community owned and managed by UDR, featuring upscale apartments and on-site amenities including fitness center, lap pool, and resident media lounge.

== Gallery ==
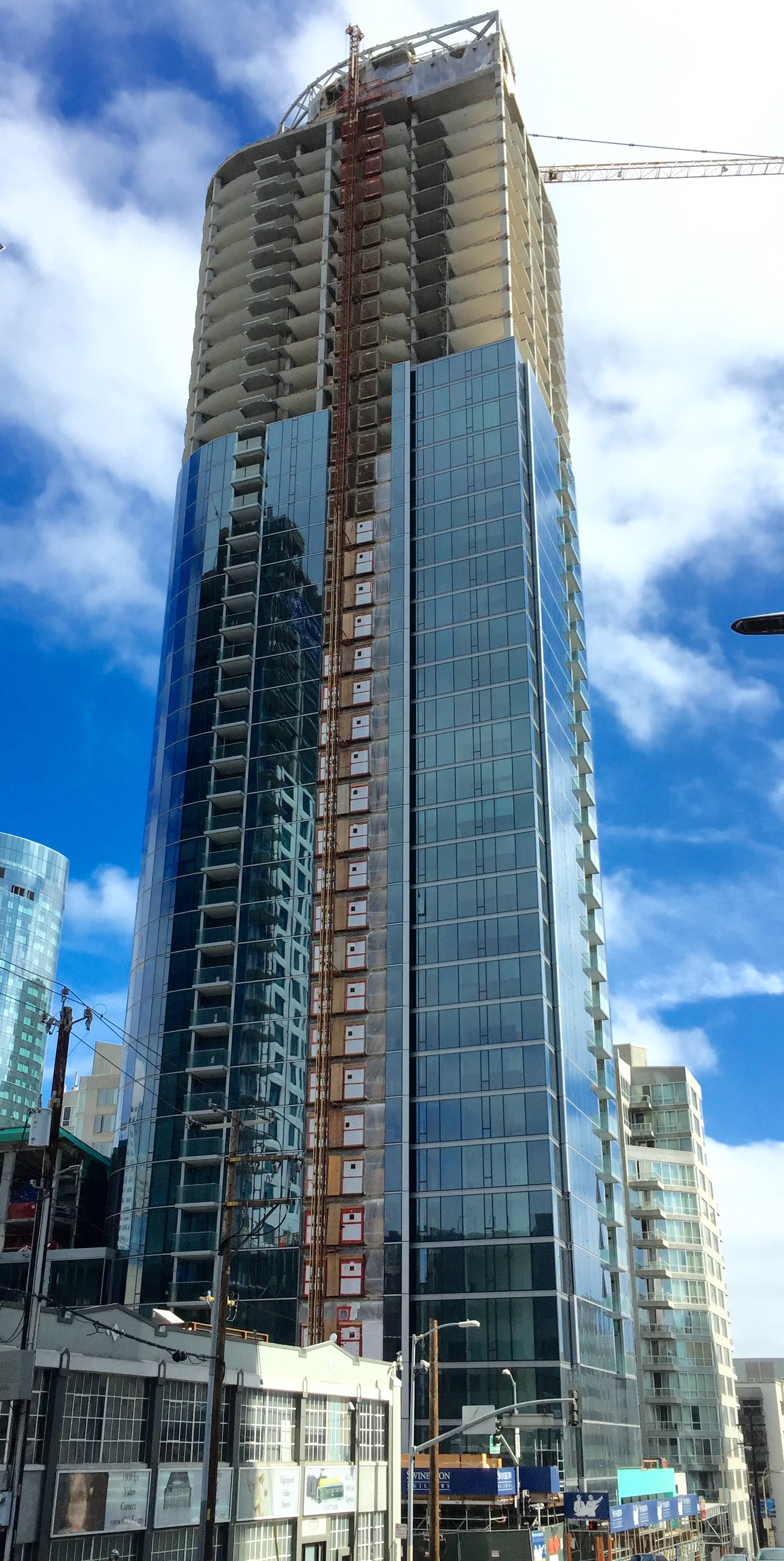
Under Construction in August 2015, West View

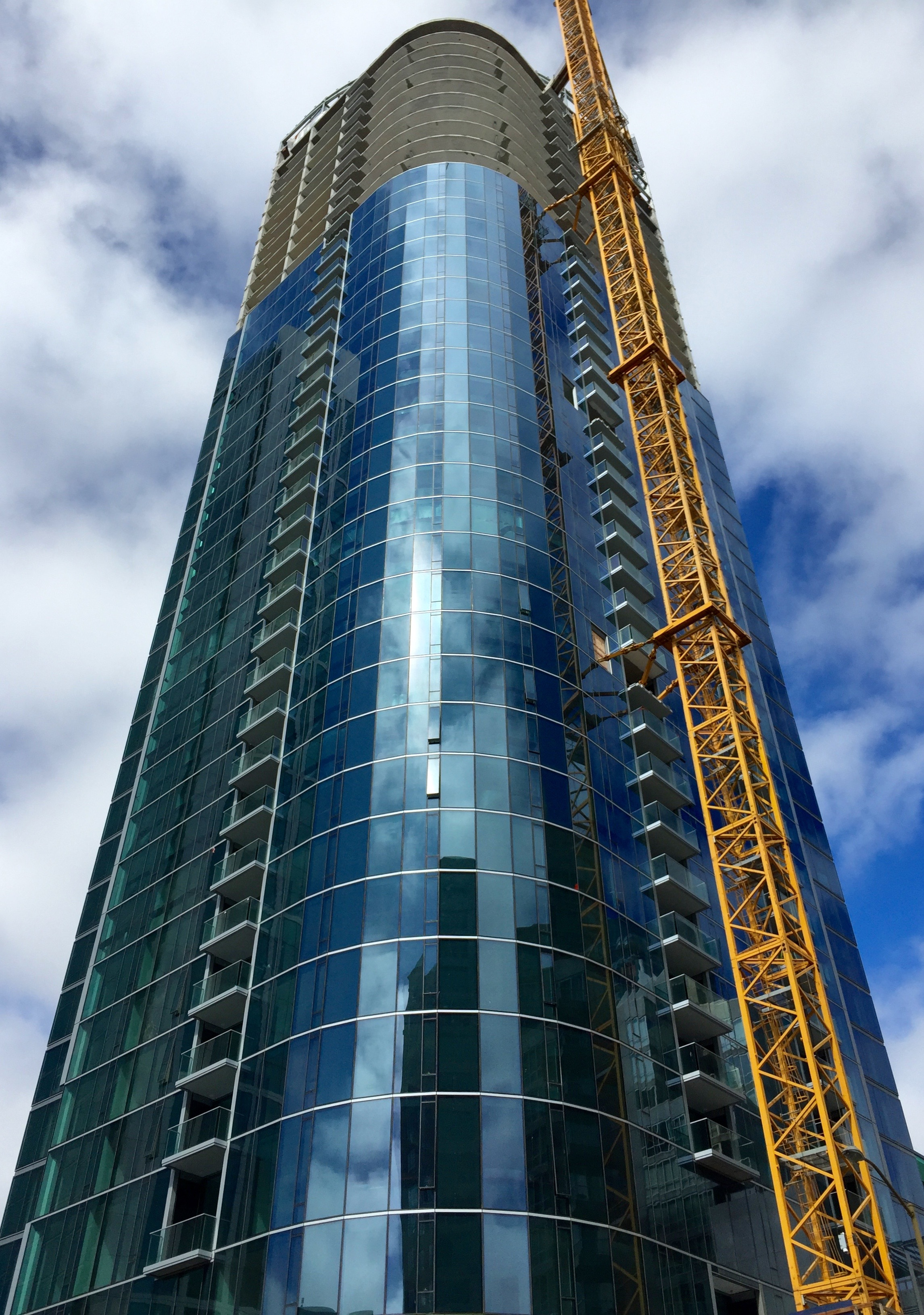
Under Construction in August 2015, Southeast View

== See also ==
- List of tallest buildings in San Francisco
