= 601 California Street =

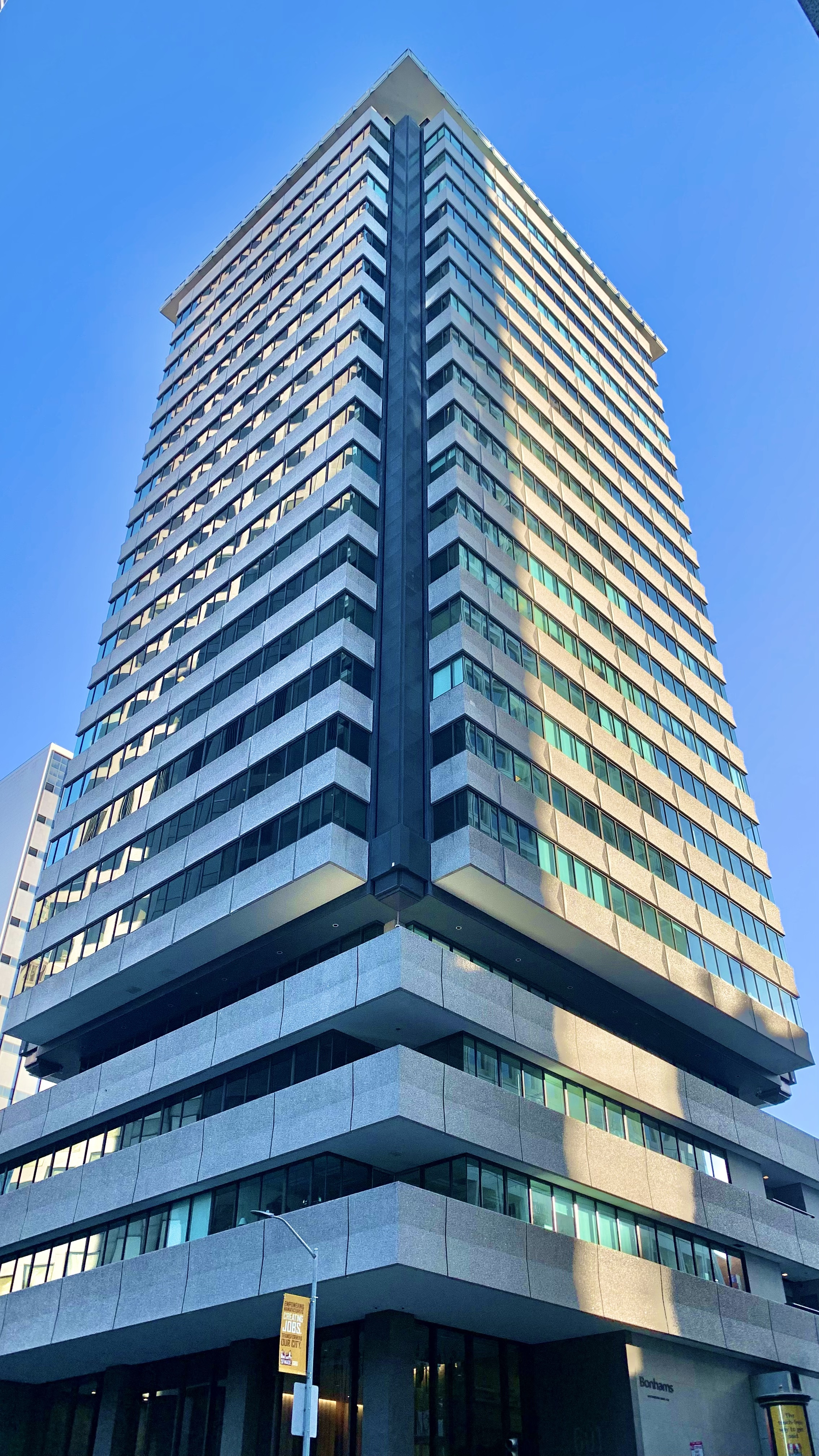
- In 2021

- Location within San Francisco Location within California Location within the United States
- Alternative names: The International Building

General information
- Status: Completed
- Type: Commercial offices
- Architectural style: International style
- Location: 601 California Street; San Francisco, California
- Coordinates: 37.79237°N 122.4047°W
- Completed: 1960 – 1961
- Cost: $10.7 million
- Owner: Natomas Company
- Operator: Embarcadero Realty Services since 2013

Height
- Roof: 107 m (351 ft)

Technical details
- Floor count: 22
- Floor area: 285,000 sq ft (26,500 m^{2})

Design and construction
- Architect: Anshen and Allen
- Structural engineer: John J. Gould & H.J. Degenkolb; Robert D. Dewell
- Main contractor: Dinwiddie Construction

601 California Street, also known as the International Building, is a 22-story, 107 m (351 ft) skyscraper in the financial district of San Francisco, California. The distinctly international style tower features eight corner offices per floor, and a terrace around the penthouse office, and received an Honor Award from the American Institute of Architects in 1963.

The Natomas Company, which controlled American President Lines (APL), formed a subsidiary which purchased the land and constructed the building. At the time of the completion of the building APL were the primary tenants. The lot was 10,000 sq. ft., but by purchasing air rights over the adjacent city-owned St. Mary's Square Garage, they were able to cantilever the top 18 floors 17 feet beyond the property line. As a result, a typical floor is 12,900 sq. ft., which is 129% of the site footprint.

The architectural firm was Anshen & Allen. The engineers were John J. Gould & H. J. Degenkolb (structural), Robert D. Dewell (structural), William Brewer and Associates (foundation), Eagelson Engineers (mechanical), and Charles Krieger (electrical). The landscape architects were Royston, Hanamoto & Mayes and the general contractor was Dinwiddie Construction Company. The structural steel contractor, Bethleham Steel Company, fabricated 4,047 tons off structural steel and erected the frame, which was connected with 113,500 A-325 bolts and 9,500 extra strength bolts.

== See also ==
- San Francisco's tallest buildings
