= 100 Van Ness Avenue =

Skyscraper in San Francisco, United States

100 Van Ness
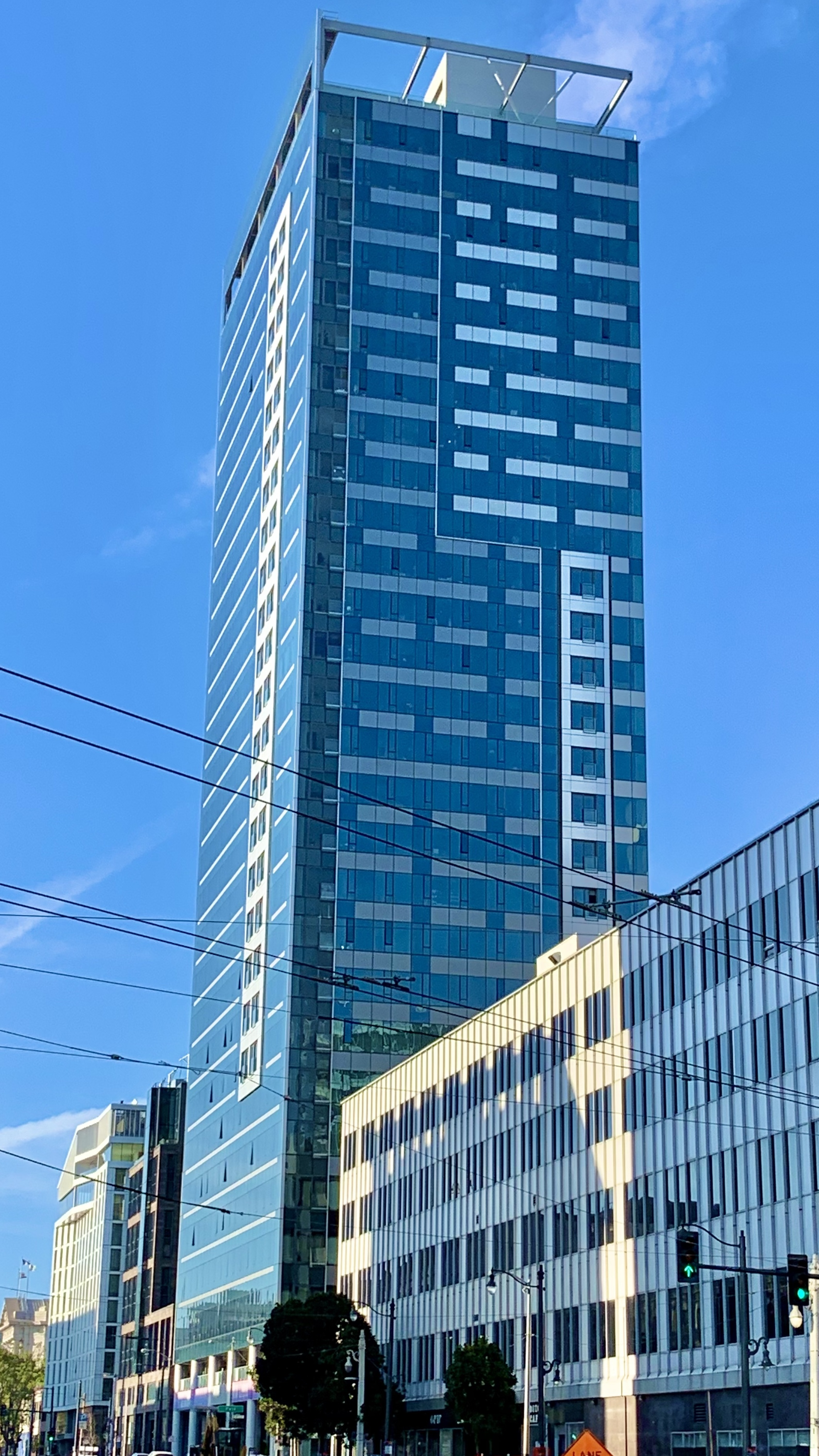
- In 2021

- Location within San Francisco 100 Van Ness Avenue (California) 100 Van Ness Avenue (the United States)

General information
- Status: Completed
- Type: Office (1974); Residential (2015)
- Location: 100 Van Ness Avenue; San Francisco
- Coordinates: 37°46′36.2″N 122°25′09.1″W
- Opening: 1974

Height
- Roof: 400 ft (122 m)

Technical details
- Floor count: 29

Design and construction
- Architects: Albert F. Roller; Office building Solomon Cordwell Buenz; Residential conversion
- Structural engineer: H.J. Brunnier (original building), IMEG (conversion)

100 Van Ness is a skyscraper in San Francisco. Formerly an office building, it was converted into residential use. It is located in the Civic Center neighborhood near the San Francisco City Hall on Van Ness Avenue. The building, completed in 1974, stands 400 feet (122 m) and has 29 floors of former office space that housed the California State Automobile Association (CSAA).

The building was sold by CSAA to VNO Patson, LLC in 2008 and was leased back to CSAA until 2010, at which time they relocated to a new corporate headquarters campus near Walnut Creek. VNO Patson's interest in the building was foreclosed on by its lender and is now owned by Civic Center Commons Associates, which took title to the property in 2011. The current owner, Emerald Fund, converted the building into 418 rental apartments. It was completed by 2015. The conversion was completed by the San Francisco office of Solomon Cordwell and Buenz and the interior design was completed by New York–based Irish Interior Designer Colum McCartan, founder and principal of McCARTAN.

== See also ==
- List of tallest buildings in San Francisco
