= Providian Financial Building =

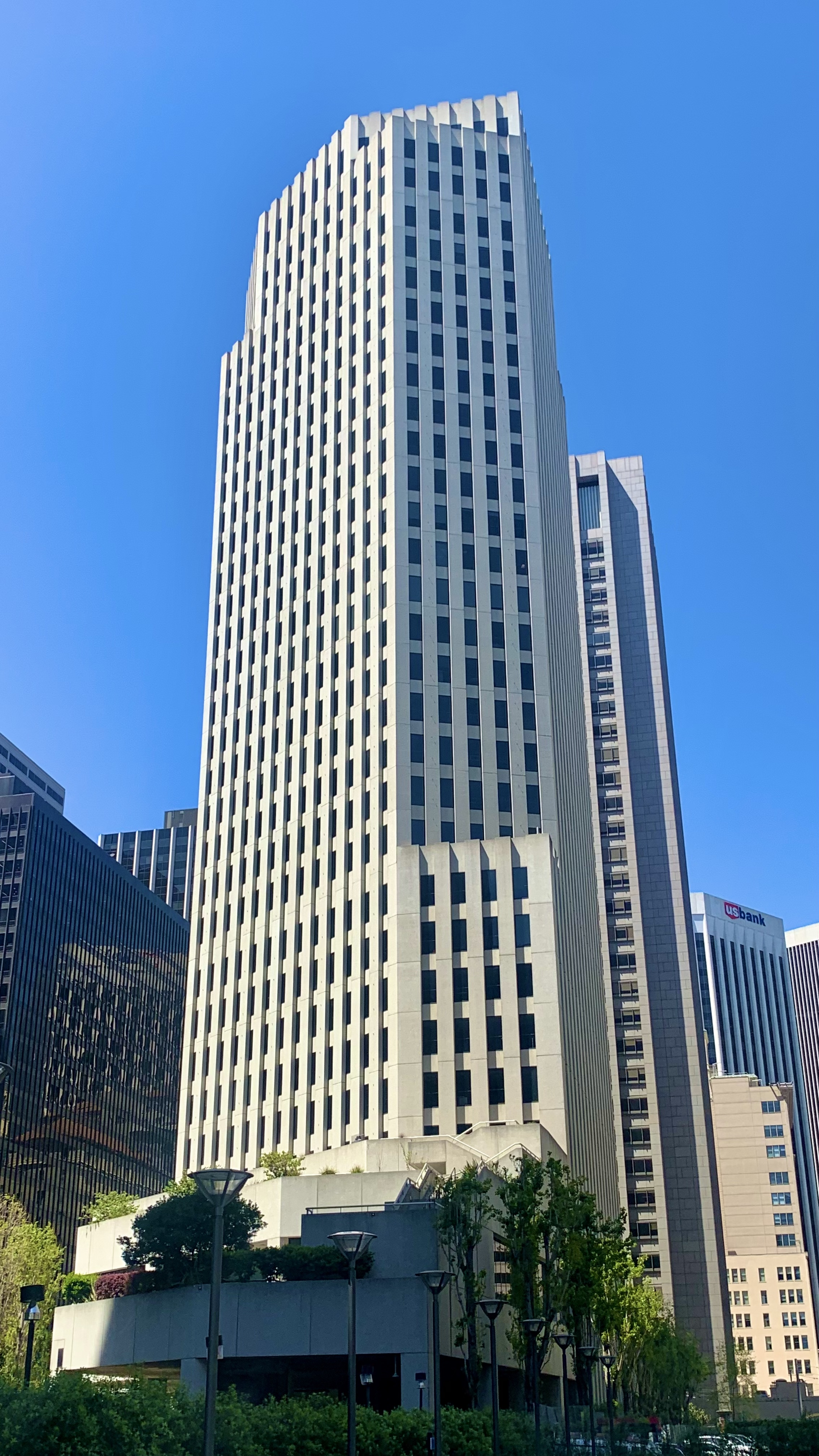
- Interactive map of the Providian Financial Building area
- Alternative names: In 2021

General information
- Status: Completed
- Type: Office
- Location: 201 Mission Street; San Francisco, California, USA
- Coordinates: 37°47′28.4″N 122°23′42.16″W
- Opening: 1981

Height
- Roof: 417 ft (127 m)

Technical details
- Floor count: 30
- Floor area: 489,284 sq ft (45,456.0 m^{2})

Design and construction
- Architect: Primiani Weaver
- Developer: EQ Office

The Providian Financial Building (also known as the Pacific Gateway Building) is a high-rise office building located at 201 Mission Street in the South of Market district of San Francisco, California. The building stands at a height of 417 feet (127 m) and has 30 stories. Its construction was completed in 1981.

The building is located on an unusual trapezoidal mid-block lot that extends from Mission Street to Howard Street. When it was constructed, the building was flanked by ramps to the Embarcadero Freeway, which have since been torn down.

== See also ==
- List of tallest buildings in San Francisco
