= 199 Fremont Street =

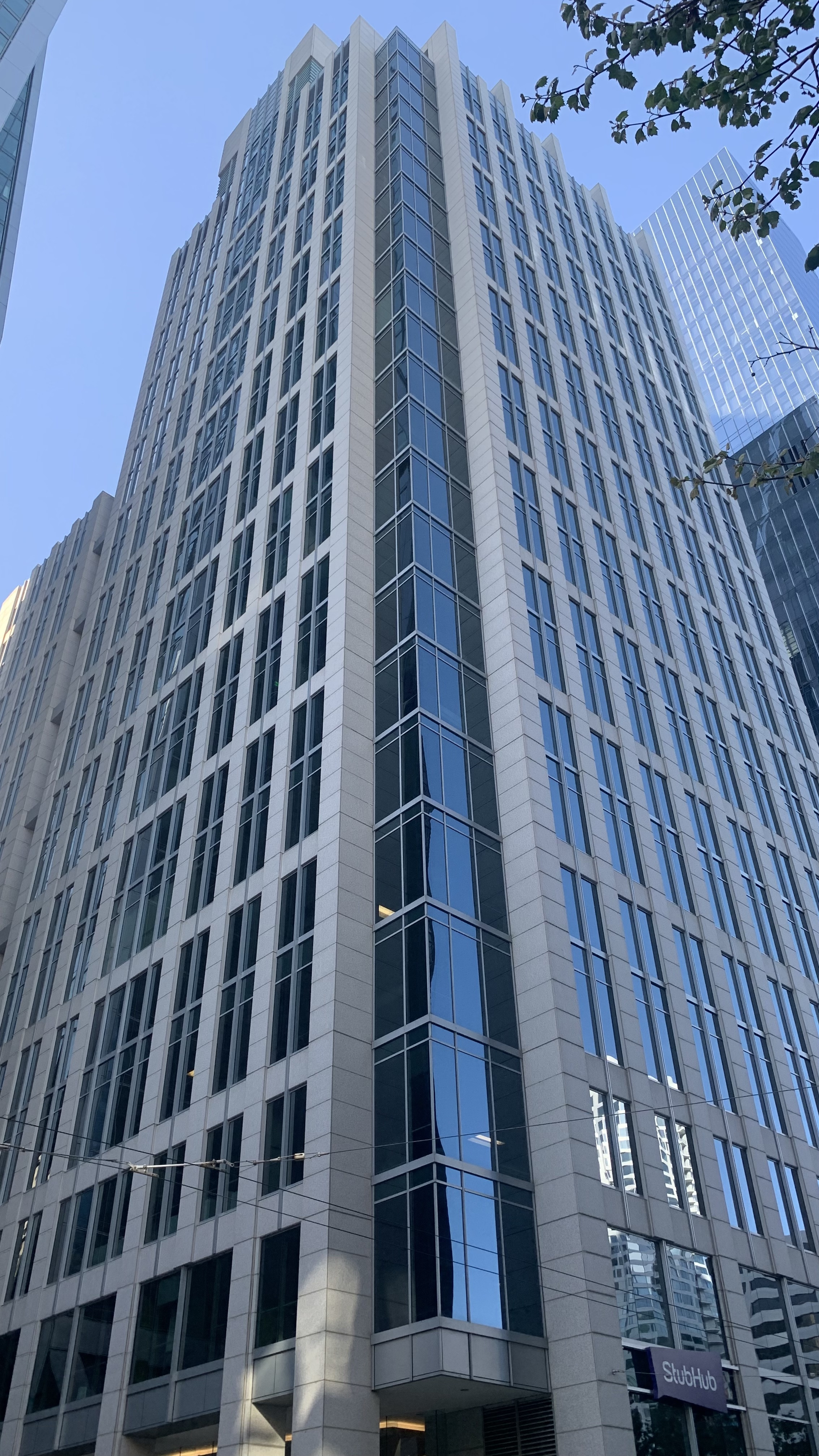
- In 2021

- Location within San Francisco

General information
- Type: Commercial offices
- Location: 199 Fremont Street; San Francisco, California
- Coordinates: 37.7899°N 122.3948°W
- Completed: 2000

Height
- Roof: 110.9 m (364 ft)

Technical details
- Floor count: 27
- Floor area: 510,000 sq ft (47,000 m^{2})

Design and construction
- Architect: KMD Architects
- Developer: Fremont Properties

199 Fremont Street, also known as 300 Howard Street, is a class-A office skyscraper in South of Market district of San Francisco, California. The 111 m (364 ft), 27-story tower was designed by KMD Architects (Kaplan Mclaughlin Diaz), and completed in 2000.

In 2025, the building was purchased for $111 million by DivcoWest and Blackstone.

Former tenants include Fitbit and StubHub. As of late 2025, the building is vacant.

== See also ==
- List of tallest buildings in San Francisco
