= 100 First Plaza =

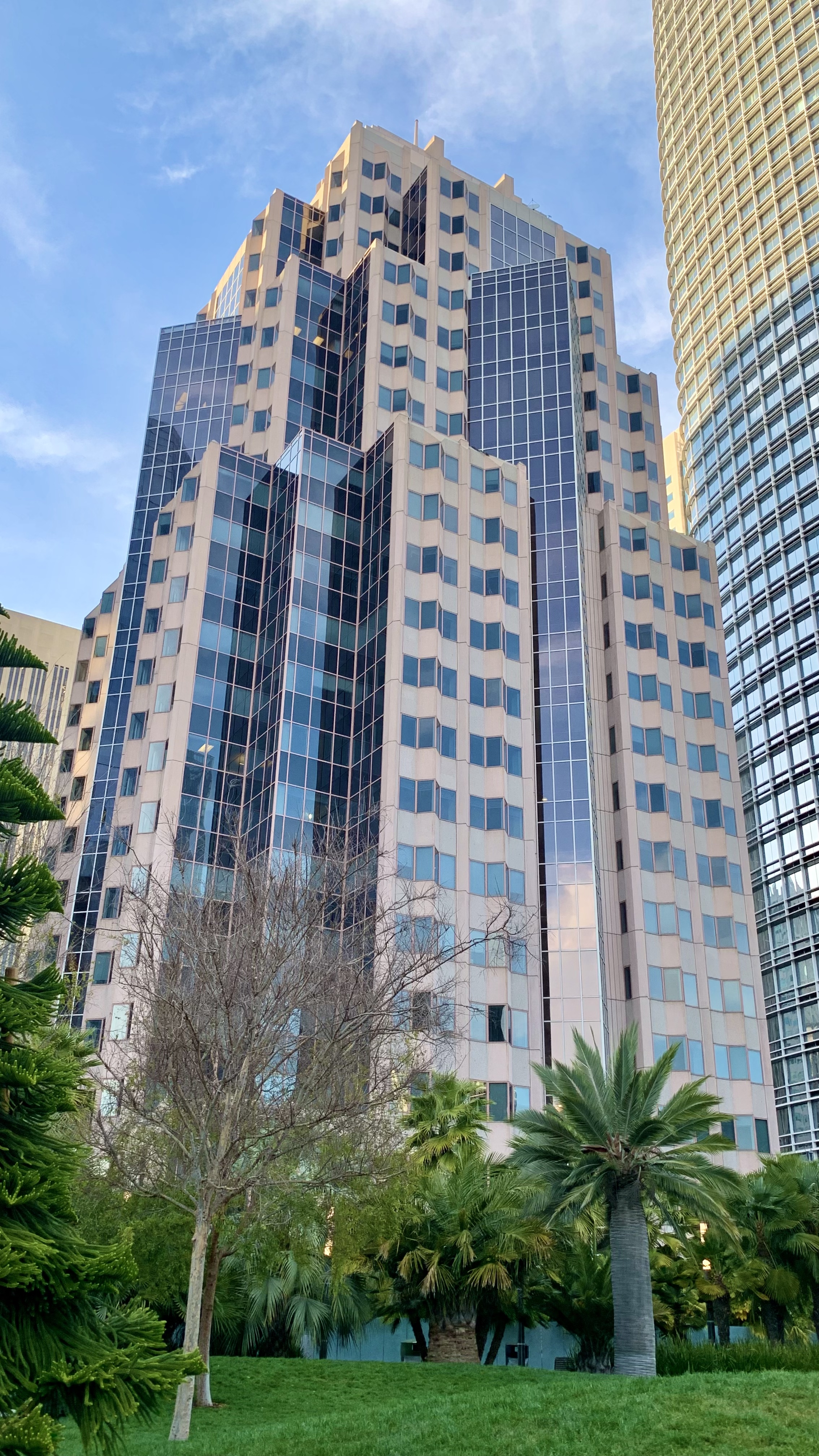
- From Salesforce Park in April 2021

- Location within San Francisco
- Alternative names: Andersen Tax Tower

General information
- Type: Commercial offices
- Architectural style: Postmodern
- Location: 100 First Street; San Francisco, California
- Coordinates: 37.789167°N 122.3975°W
- Completed: 1988
- Owner: Kilroy Realty Corporation
- Operator: Kilroy Realty Corporation

Height
- Antenna spire: 136.25 m (447.0 ft)
- Roof: 116 m (381 ft)

Technical details
- Floor count: 27
- Floor area: 450,200 sq ft (41,820 m^{2})

Design and construction
- Architect: SOM
- Developer: Barker Patrinely Group LLC
- Main contractor: Swinerton & Walberg

100 First Plaza (also known as the Delta Dental Tower) is a 27-story, 136 m (446 ft) high-rise office skyscraper located at 100 First Street in the Financial District of San Francisco, California. Construction of the building was completed in 1988. It is the 35th-tallest building in the city. Skidmore, Owings & Merrill served as the design architects for the 100 First Plaza development that was designed with several setbacks, along with a grooved and faceted façade, and contains several rooftop curtain walls, and a notable 19 m (62 ft) spire.

== Tenants ==
- ADR Services, Inc.
- AppsFlyer
- Andersen Tax
- HomeLight
- Okta

== See also ==
- San Francisco's tallest buildings
