= 150 California Street =

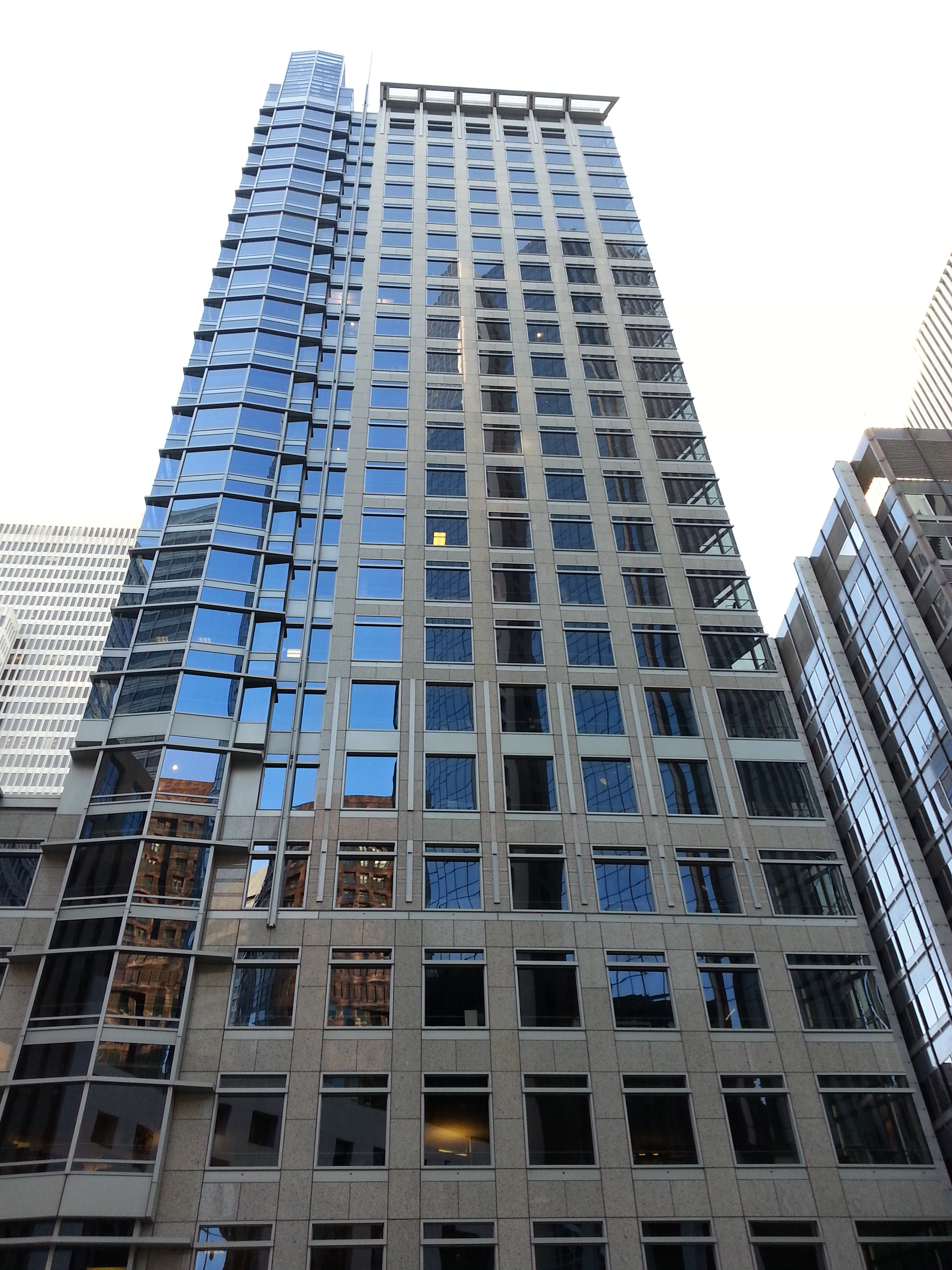
- 150 California Street, San Francisco.

- Location within San Francisco 150 California Street (California) 150 California Street (the United States)

General information
- Status: Completed
- Type: Commercial offices
- Architectural style: Postmodernism
- Location: 150 California Street; San Francisco, California
- Coordinates: 37.7936°N 122.3985°W
- Completed: 2000

Height
- Roof: 100.59 m (330.0 ft)

Technical details
- Floor count: 24
- Floor area: 206,000 sq ft (19,100 m^{2})
- Lifts/elevators: 6

Design and construction
- Architect: Hellmuth, Obata and Kassabaum
- Developer: Equity Office Properties Trust

150 California Street is a 24-story, 101 m (331 ft) office tower skyscraper located on California Street in the financial district of San Francisco, California.

== History ==
Construction of the building was completed in 2000 and the building was designed by architecture firm Hellmuth, Obata + Kassabaum. In 2002, the AIA San Francisco and San Francisco Business Times honored its designers with the 2002 Honor Award for Architecture.

== Tenants ==
- GCA Savvian

== See also ==
- List of tallest buildings in San Francisco
