= Jasper (San Francisco) =

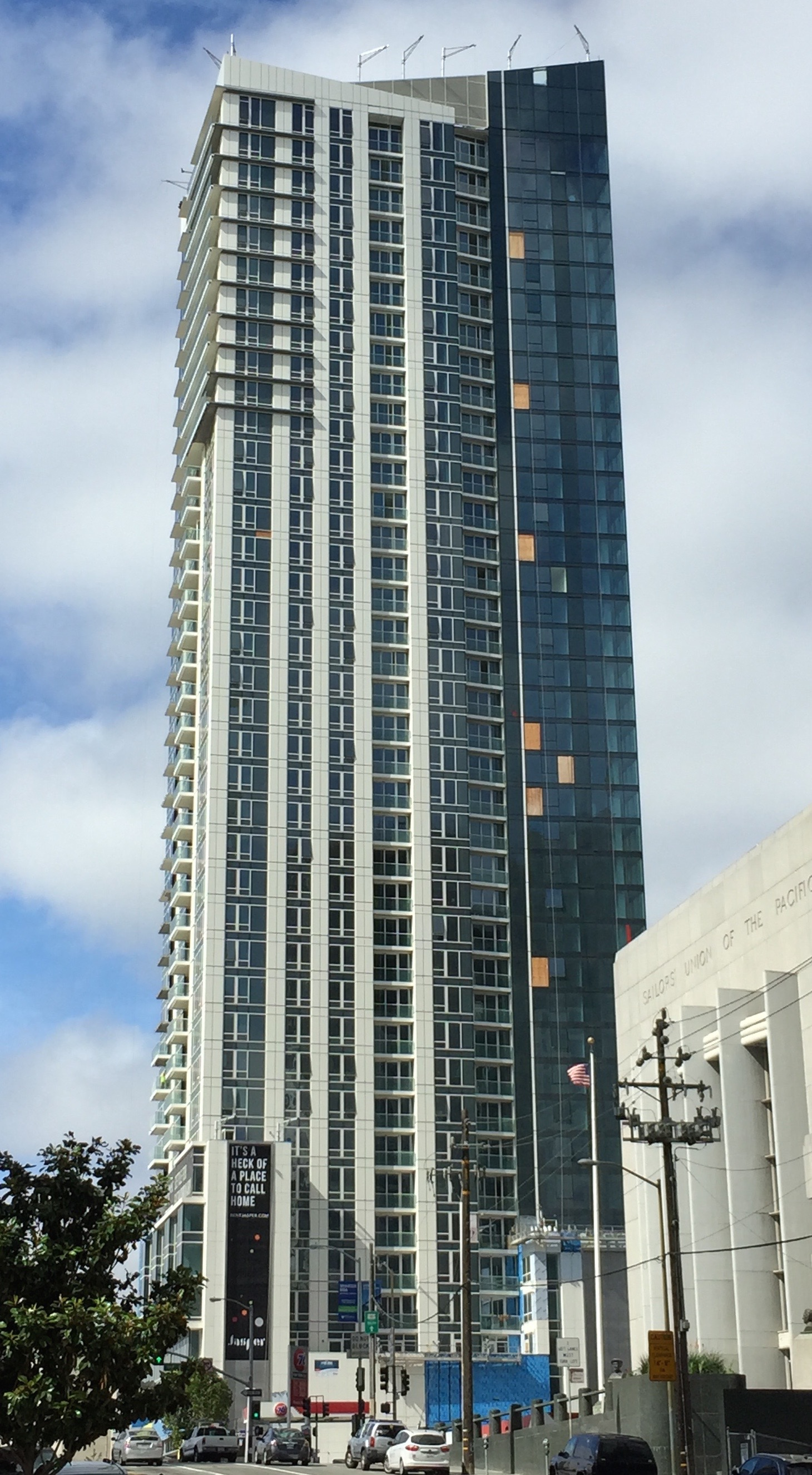

- Location within San Francisco Location within California Location within the United States
- Former names: 514 Harrison Street

General information
- Status: Completed
- Type: Residential condominiums
- Location: 514 Harrison Street; San Francisco, California
- Coordinates: 37.78586°N 122.39375°W
- Construction started: 2013
- Completed: 2015

Height
- Architectural: 430 ft (130 m)
- Roof: 400 ft (120 m)

Technical details
- Floor count: 39
- Lifts/elevators: 4

Design and construction
- Architects: Swedroe Architects; HKS Architects
- Developer: Crescent Heights
- Structural engineer: Louie International
- Main contractor: Build Group concrete_subcontractor = Pacific Structures

Other information
- Number of units: 320

Jasper is a 430-foot (130 m) residential skyscraper located at 514 Harrison Street in the Rincon Hill neighborhood of San Francisco, California, United States. The tower contains 320 residential units on 39 floors.

== History ==
In 2006, Jackson Pacific Ventures entitled the site for a 400 foot (120 m) residential tower with 227 units. Jackson Pacific then sold the entitlements to Turberry Associates for US$30 million. The groundbreaking was delayed due to the 2008 financial crisis, and in 2010 Crescent Heights purchased the property for US$13 million.

In 2011, Crescent Heights re-entitled the property, changing the number of units from 227 to 320, while keeping the building the same height. To make room for the new configuration, the number of studios was increased from 3 to 99, one-bedrooms decreased from 111 to 93, two-bedrooms were increased from 77 to 128, and all 36 three-bedrooms were removed. By 2012, Crescent Heights received its building permits, and construction began in 2013.

According to planning documents, the building rises 400 feet (120 m) to the roof line, and the mechanical screening structures account for an additional 30 feet (9.1 m). The first residents moved into the building in October 2015.

== See also ==
- List of tallest buildings in San Francisco
