= The Avery =

Residential building in San Francisco, California

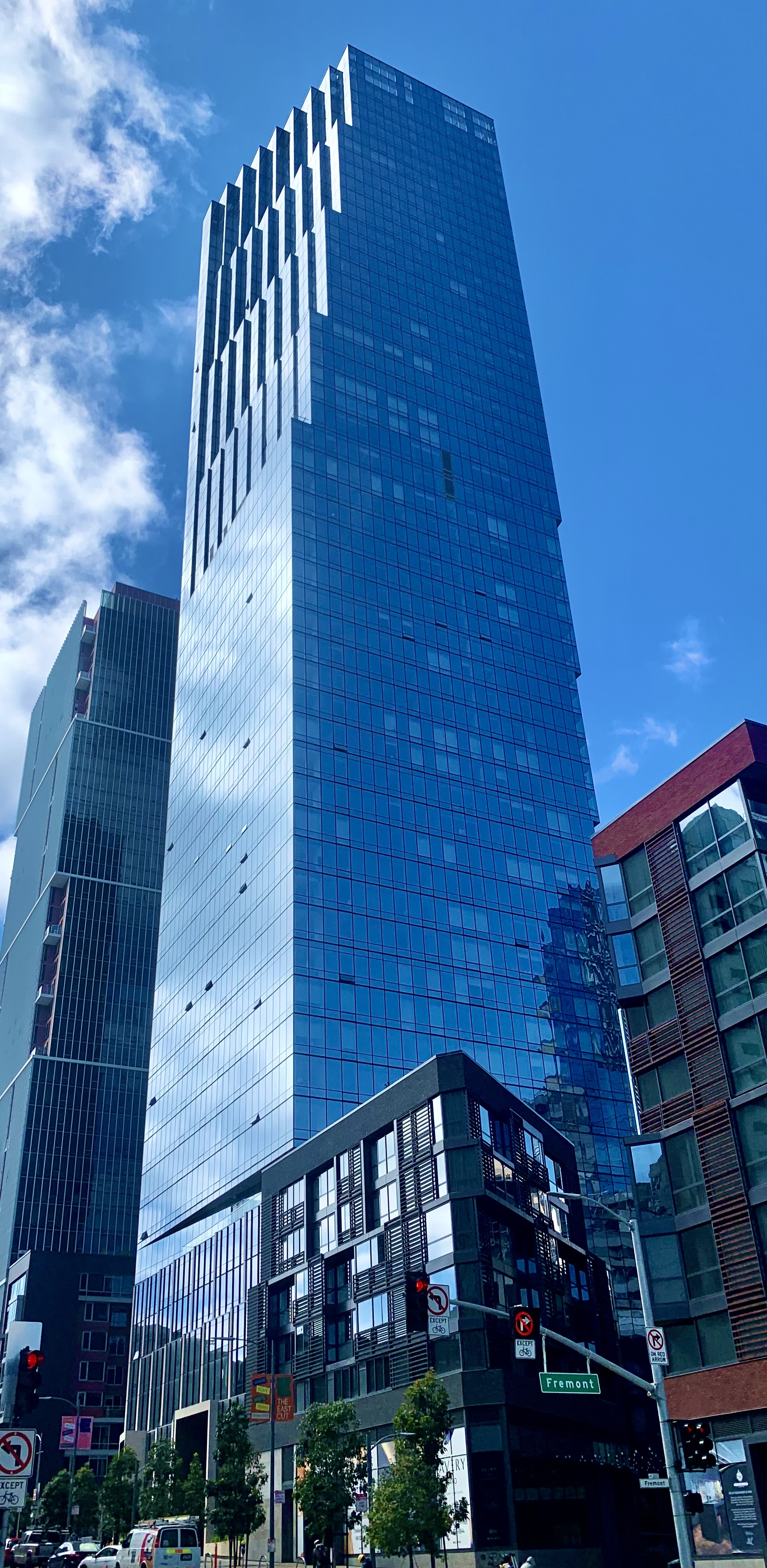
- The Avery in San Francisco, CA.

- Location within San Francisco
- Former names: Transbay Block 8 Tower

General information
- Type: Residential condominiums
- Location: 488 Folsom Street; San Francisco, California
- Coordinates: 37.787778°N 122.394167°W
- Construction started: 2016
- Completed: 17 June 2019

Height
- Roof: 618 ft (188 m)
- Top floor: 618 ft (188 m)

Technical details
- Floor count: 56

Design and construction
- Architect: Office for Metropolitan Architecture
- Developer: The Related Companies
- Structural engineer: Magnusson Klemencic Associates

Other information
- Number of units: 419

Website
- www.theaverysf.com

The Avery is a 57-story, 618 ft (188 m) residential skyscraper in the South of Market district of San Francisco, California. The tower site is bounded by Folsom Street on the south and Fremont Street on the east.

The building features 118 luxurious condominium residences starting on the 33rd floor and upwards, and premium luxury apartment rentals on floors 2-32 at Avery 450.

== See also ==
- List of tallest buildings in San Francisco
