= 123 Mission Street =

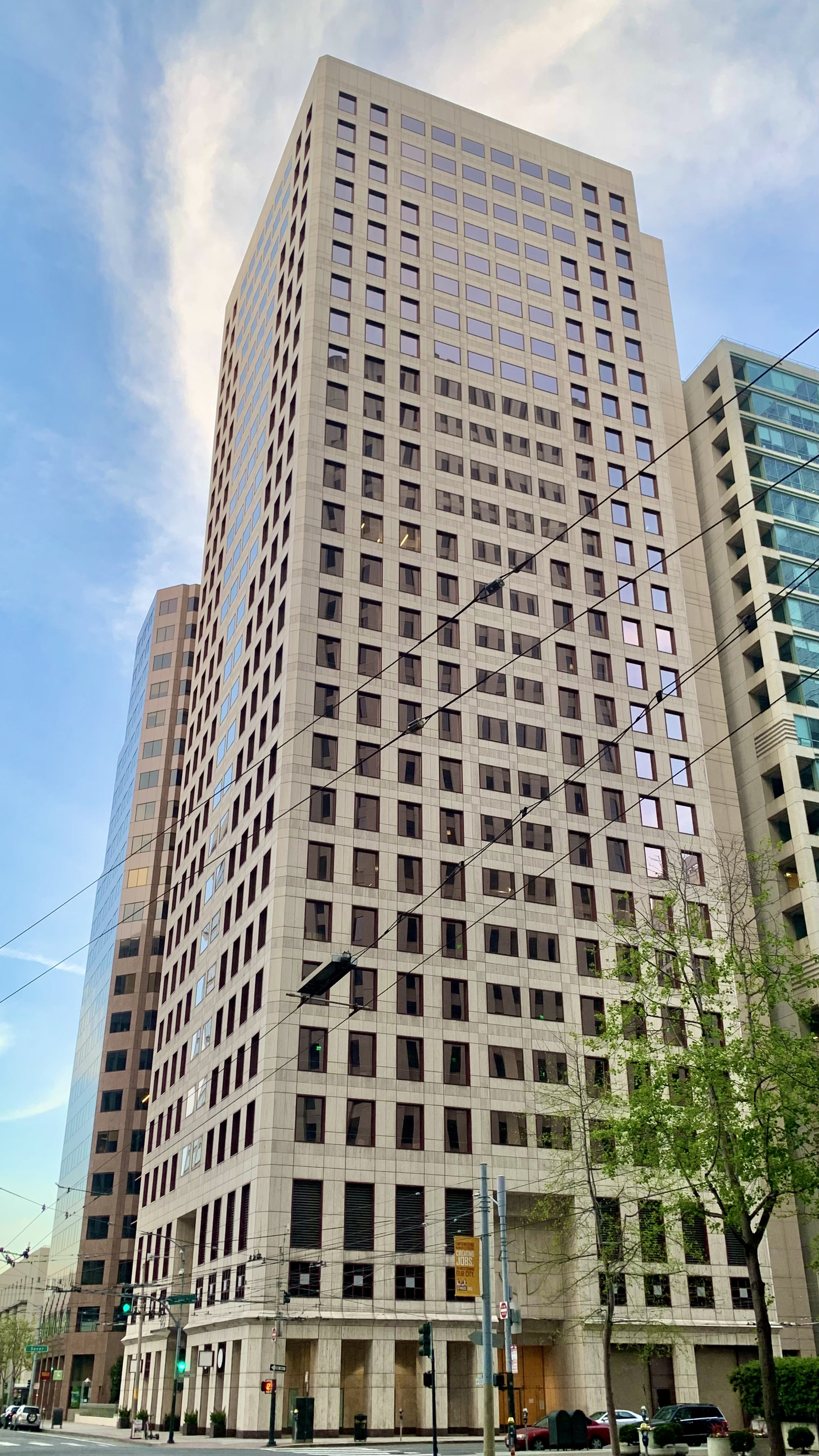
- In 2021

- Location within San Francisco
- Former names: Pacific Gas & Electric Building

General information
- Type: Commercial offices
- Location: 123 Mission Street; San Francisco, California
- Coordinates: 37.7919°N 122.3945°W
- Completed: 1986
- Owner: Northwood, LLC

Height
- Roof: 124 m (407 ft)

Technical details
- Floor count: 29
- Floor area: 100,481 m^{2} (1,081,570 sq ft)

Design and construction
- Architect: Skidmore, Owings & Merrill
- Developer: Shorenstein Properties
- Structural engineer: Skidmore, Owings & Merrill

123 Mission Street, sometimes referenced as the Pacific Gas & Electric Building, is a 124 m (407 ft) 29 floor skyscraper in the SOMA neighborhood of San Francisco, California, completed in 1986. The tower was developed by Shorenstein Properties and designed by Skidmore, Owings & Merrill.

In 2018, Northwood Investors of New York bought the building $290 million."

== History ==
Completed in 1986, the tower was developed by Shorenstein Properties and designed by Skidmore, Owings & Merrill.

It was owned by Northwood, LLC, which acquired it for $300 million from the Chinese insurance company, HNA Group in 2018. Juul announced in June 2019 that it had purchased 123 Mission Street, while maintaining an existing space on Pier 70. The deal was "one of the largest in San Francisco history for a tech company that doesn't specialize in real estate". The building was worth an estimated $400 million.

In November 2019, Juul laid off 23 employees at its new 123 Mission Street Office and was considering selling the building, which it had acquired for $397 million.

As of May 2023, during what the San Francisco Chronicle described as "Downtown San Francisco['s] worst office vacancy crisis on record", 123 Mission Street had a vacancy rate of 89.9%.

As of March 2026, Madison Capital is talks to purchase the building.

== Features ==
The tower is 28 stories, with 363,000 square feet of real estate.

== See also ==
- List of tallest buildings in San Francisco
