= 333 Market Street =

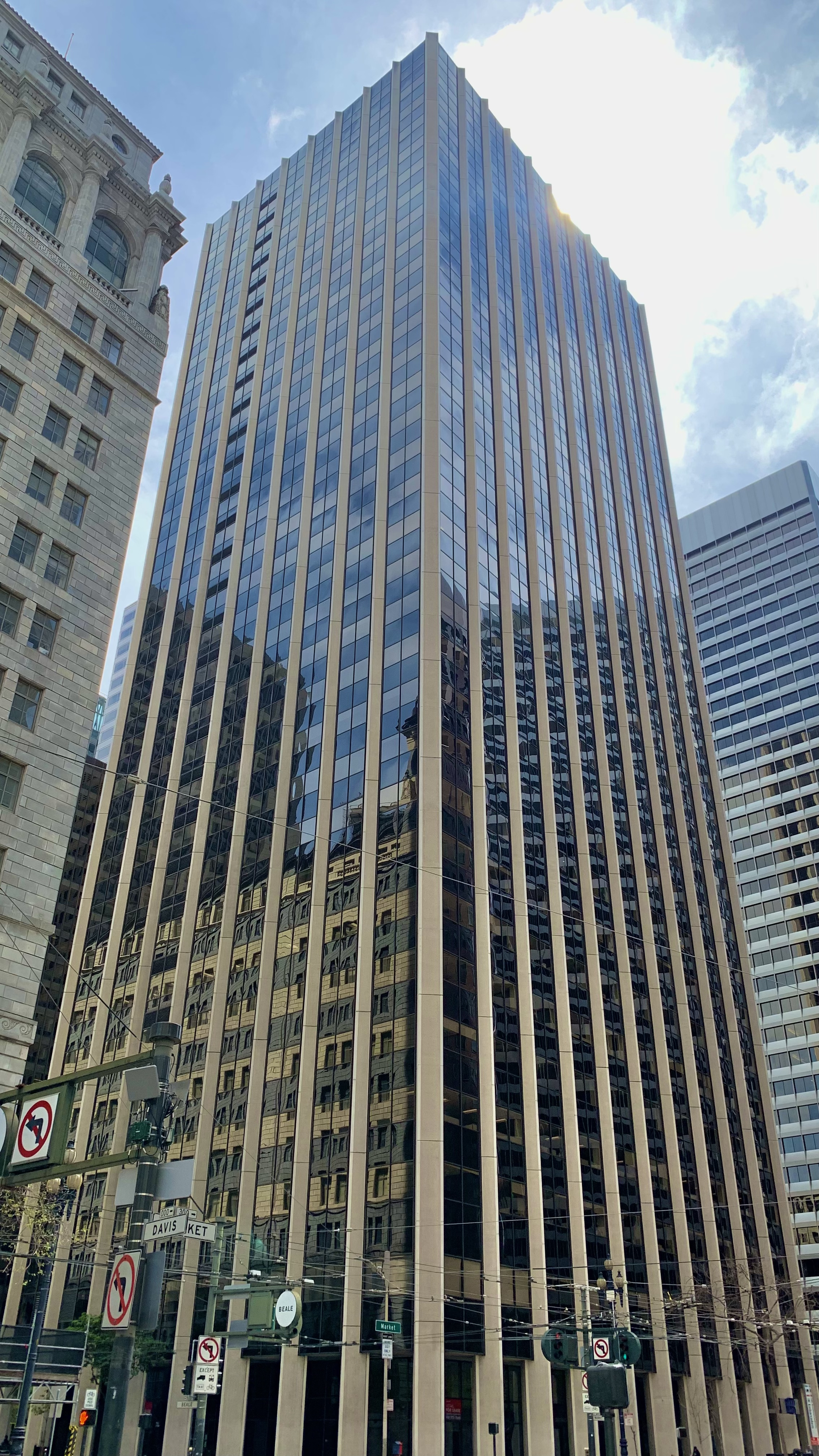
- In 2021

- Location within San Francisco Location within California Location within the United States

General information
- Type: Commercial offices
- Location: 333 Market Street; San Francisco
- Coordinates: 37.79194°N 122.3975°W
- Completed: 1979

Height
- Roof: 144 m (472 ft)

Technical details
- Floor count: 33

Design and construction
- Architect: Gin Wong Associates
- Developer: Shorenstein Properties

333 Market Street is a class-A office skyscraper on Market Street between Fremont and Beale in the Financial District of San Francisco, California. The 144 m (472 ft), 33-story tower was designed by Gin Wong Associates, and completed in 1979.

== See also ==
- List of tallest buildings in San Francisco
