= 101 Montgomery =

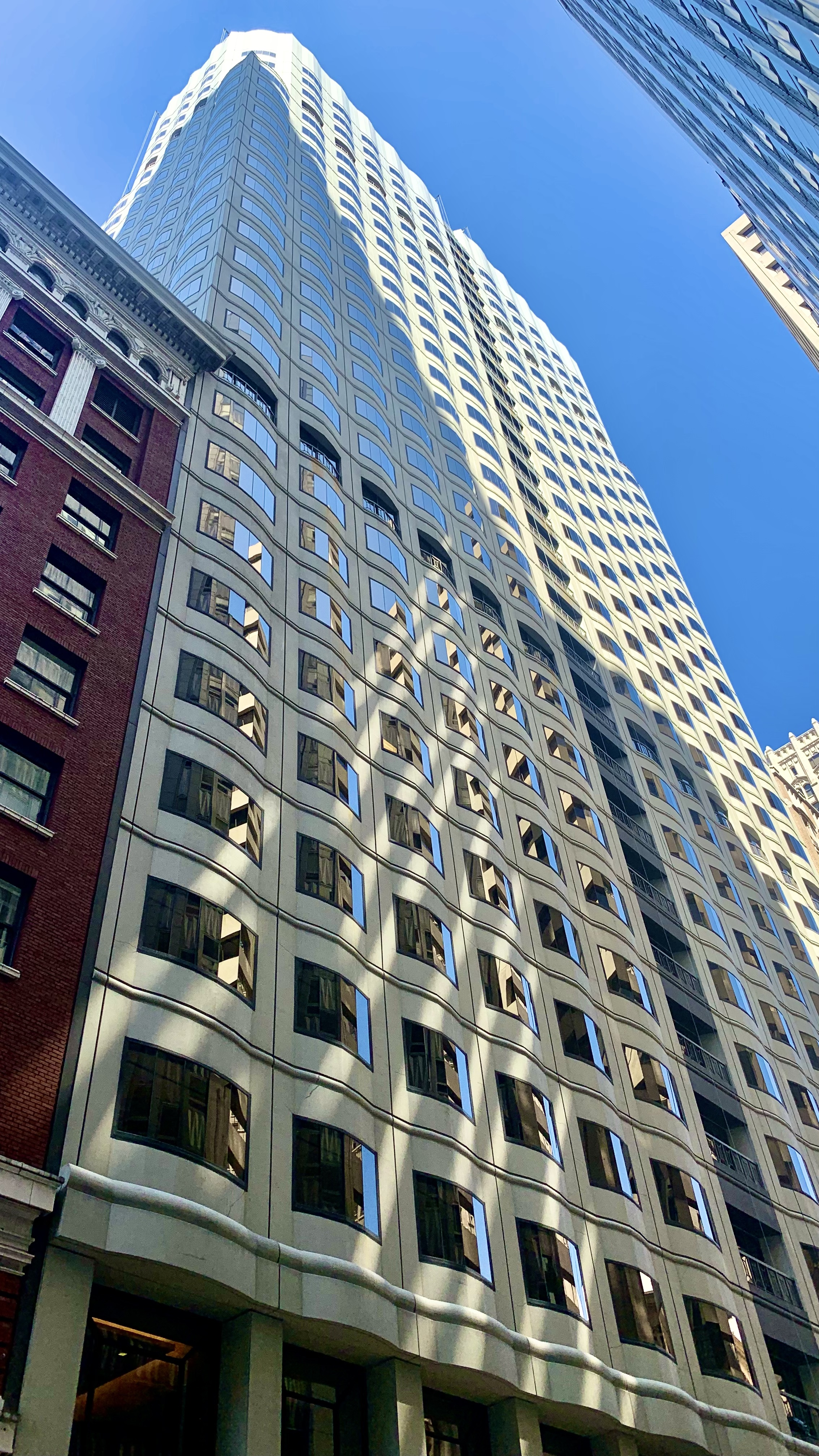
- In May 2021

- Location within San Francisco 101 Montgomery (California) 101 Montgomery (the United States)

General information
- Status: Completed
- Type: Office
- Location: 101 Montgomery Street; San Francisco, California, United States
- Coordinates: 37.7904°N 122.4024°W
- Opening: 1984

Height
- Roof: 404 ft (123 m)

Technical details
- Floor count: 28

Design and construction
- Developer: Cahill Contractors

101 Montgomery (also known as The Schwab Building) is a high-rise office building located in San Francisco, California. The building rises 404 feet (123 m) in the northern region of San Francisco's Financial District. It contains 28 floors, and was completed in 1984. 101 Montgomery is currently tied with Embarcadero West as the 39th-tallest building in the city. The building's developer was Cahill Contractors. The building has earlier served as the headquarters of Charles Schwab & Company. Flexible office space is opening in 2025

== See also ==
- List of tallest buildings in San Francisco
