= 388 Market Street =

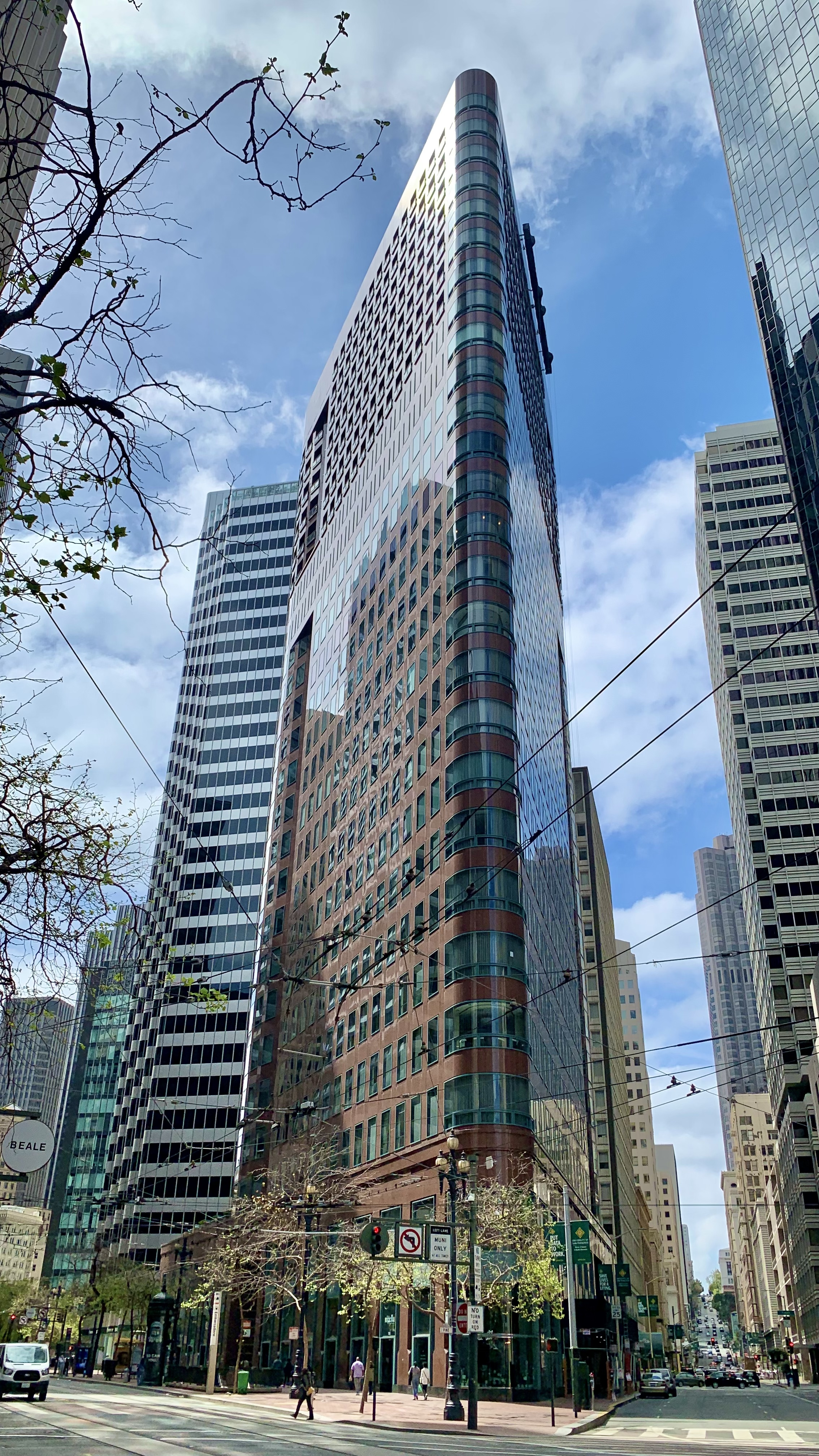
- In 2021
- Interactive map of the 388 Market Street area
- Alternative names: One Pine Street

General information
- Status: Completed
- Type: Commercial offices Residential apartments
- Architectural style: Postmodernism
- Location: 388 Market Street; San Francisco, California
- Coordinates: 37.7922°N 122.3982°W
- Completed: 1987

Height
- Roof: 94 m (308 ft)

Technical details
- Floor count: 24
- Floor area: 210,000 sq ft (20,000 m^{2})

Design and construction
- Architect: SOM
- Developer: Honorway Investment Corporation

388 Market Street is a 24-story, 94 m (308 ft) mixed-use flatiron skyscraper, completed in 1987 on Market Street in the financial district of San Francisco, California. The building is clad in red granite. The top seven floors house luxury apartments, while the lower floors contain office space. It was designed by Skidmore, Owings & Merrill.

== See also ==
- List of tallest buildings in San Francisco
