= 425 California Street =

Building in San Francisco

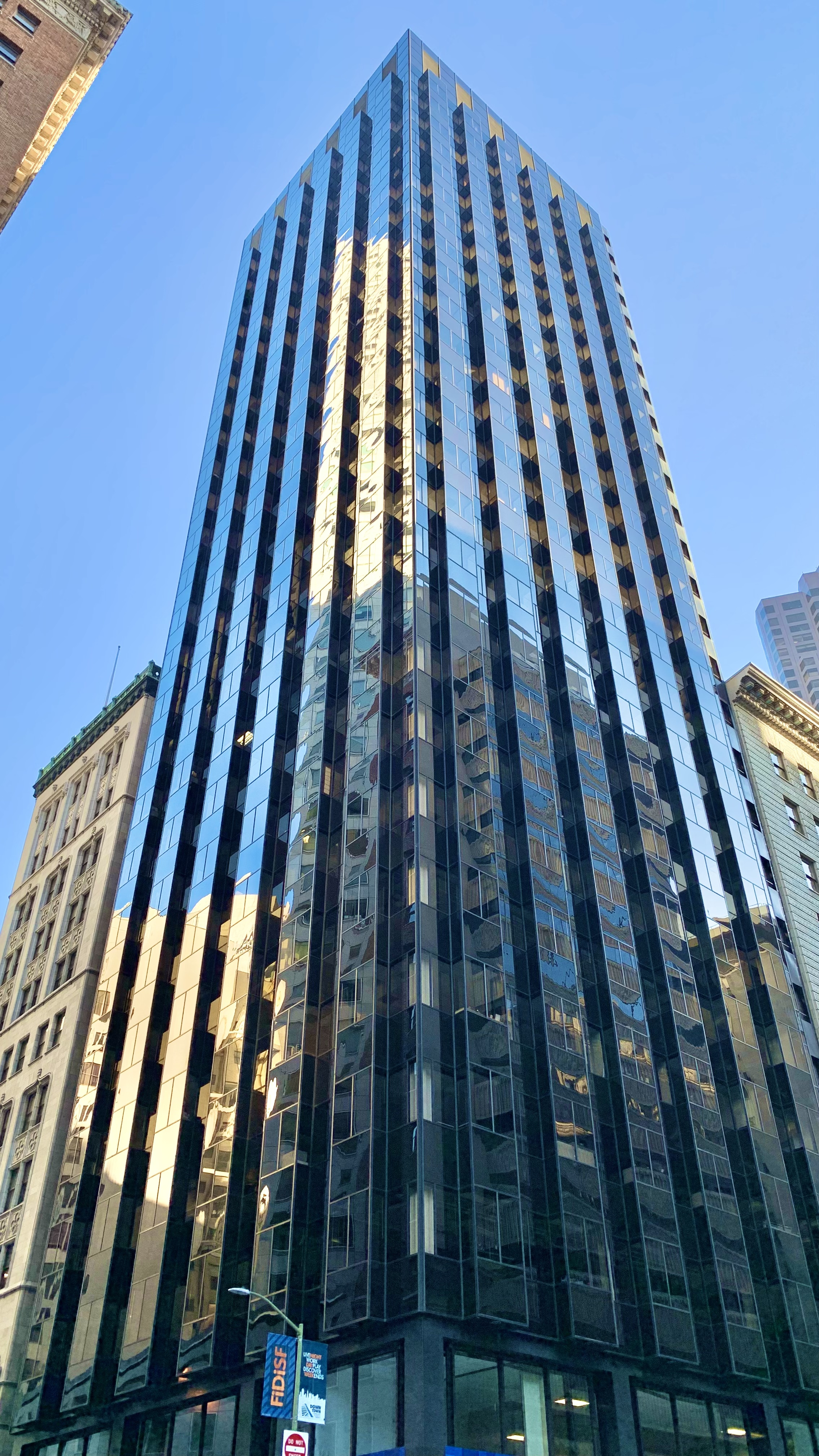
- In 2021

- Location within San Francisco
- Alternative names: First Savings Building

General information
- Type: Commercial offices
- Location: 425 California Street; San Francisco, California
- Coordinates: 37.792796°N 122.401353°W
- Completed: 1968
- Owner: California Sansome Co
- Management: Cushman & Wakefield, Inc.

Height
- Roof: 109 m (358 ft)

Technical details
- Floor count: 29

Design and construction
- Architects: John Carl Warnecke & Associates

425 California Street is a 26-story high-rise office building on California and Sansome Streets in San Francisco, California. It is the headquarters for Cahill Contractors. It was completed in 1968.
