= First Market Tower =

Skyscraper in San Francisco, California

525 Market Street
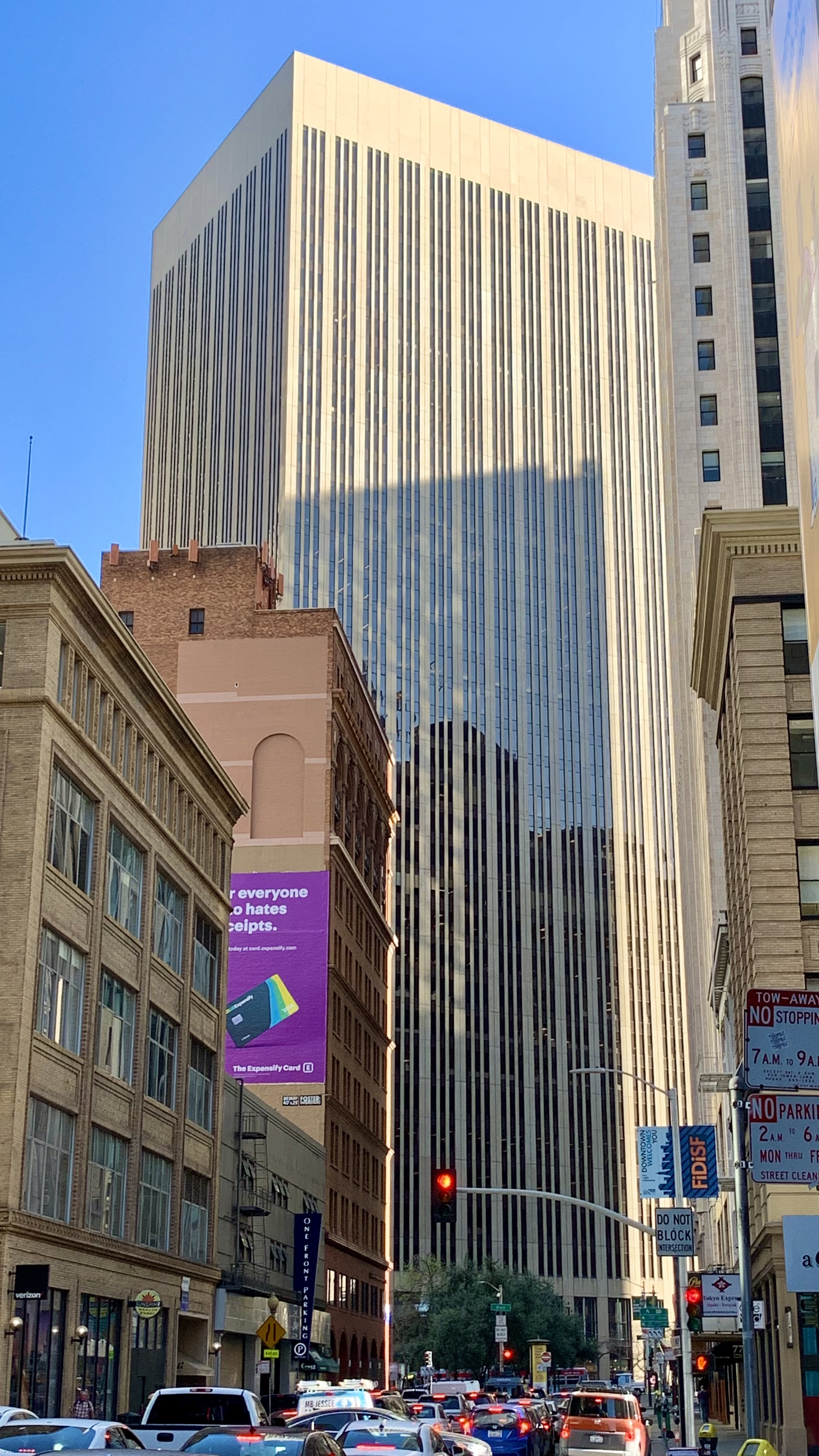
- 525 Market Street (center)

- Location within San Francisco
- Former names: Tishhman Building, First Market Tower

General information
- Type: Commercial offices
- Location: 525 Market Street; San Francisco, California
- Coordinates: 37.7905°N 122.3991°W
- Completed: 1973
- Renovated: 1991
- Owner: Knickerbocker Properties

Height
- Roof: 161 m (528 ft)
- Top floor: 39

Technical details
- Floor area: 1,083,000 square feet (100,600 m^{2})

Design and construction
- Architect: John Carl Warnecke & Associates
- Main contractor: Cahill Contractors, Inc.

525 Market Street, once known as First Market Tower, is an office skyscraper at the southwest corner of First- and Market Streets in the Financial District of San Francisco, California. The 161 m (528 ft), 39 floor tower was the second largest office building by square footage in the city (after 555 California Street) when completed in 1973. It is owned by the New York State Teachers Retirement System since 1998. It is one of 39 San Francisco high rises reported by the U.S. Geological Survey as potentially vulnerable to a large earthquake, due to a flawed welding technique.

== History ==
In 2020, 49% stake of the building was sold to a Deutsche Bank subsidiary for $682 million.

== Tenants ==
- Amazon rents 40% of the total area. It hosts the Amazon Web Services and Amazon Music divisions.
- Sephora hosts their North America headquarters.
