= 655 West Broadway =

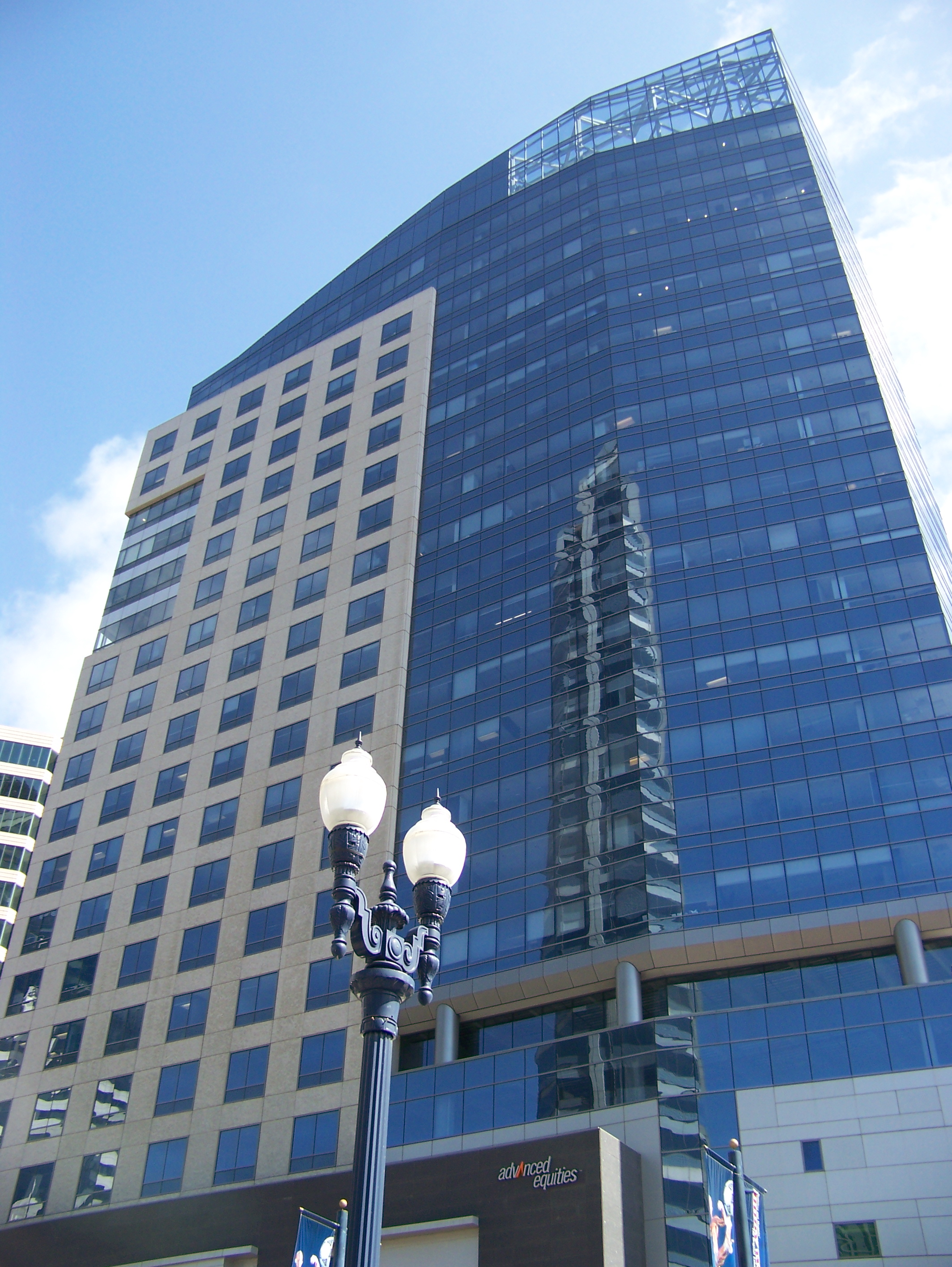
- April 2009
- Interactive map of the 655 West Broadway area

General information
- Type: Office; Residential; Retail
- Location: 655 West Broadway, San Diego, California 92101
- Coordinates: 32°42′55.11″N 117°10′7.61″W
- Construction started: October 2003
- Completed: 2005
- Owner: 655 WB Operating, LLC
- Operator: Avison Young

Height
- Antenna spire: None
- Roof: 412 ft (126 m)

Technical details
- Floor count: 23
- Floor area: 380,000 sq ft (35,300 m^{2})
- Lifts/elevators: 11

Design and construction
- Architect: Carrier Johnson Architects
- Developer: Broadway Tower 655, LLC
- Structural engineer: MKA, Seattle, Washington

Other information
- Parking: 765

655 West Broadway is the 13th-tallest building in San Diego, California, and is a prominent fixture in San Diego's skyline. Tied with Pinnacle Marina Tower, it has a height of 412 feet (126 m). It is located at 655 West Broadway in the Marina district of downtown San Diego. 655 West Broadway is a 23-story building that uses the postmodern architectural style and was designed by Carrier Johnson Architects. It is primarily an office building but also contains residential and retail uses.

== History ==
The construction of the 380,000 sq ft (35,300 m^{2}) skyscraper began in 2003 and was completed in 2005. It was the first new office tower in downtown San Diego in a dozen years. The building was originally named Broadway 655. In 2007 Advanced Equities changed the name to Advanced Equities Plaza after signing a 10-year lease on the building. In August 2011 First Allied Securities split off from Advanced Equities via a sale of the company to its management, forming an independent brokerage. The building name changed again to First Allied Plaza in March 2012 due to the separation of First Allied from Advanced Equities. First Allied uses three floors of the 23-story skyscraper. The building is now referred to as "655 West Broadway". Other tenants include Deloitte Development LLC, Interlaced LLC and the law firm Robbins Geller Rudman and Dowd.

== Ownership ==
The building was originally built by Broadway Tower 655, LLC, a limited partnership of which Robert V. Lankford of Lankford & Associates, Inc. was the managing partner. In July 2007, the building was sold to the Dutch firm Wereldhave USA under the direction of Carmen Taveras-Cruz, the company's former president for $210 million. Wereldhave sold the building in March 2013 to Lone Star Funds, a Dallas-based private equity firm, for a reported $140.88 million, representing a loss of over $70 million on Wereldhave's investment. The building was sold by Lone Star Funds in 2014 for $156.8 million to 655 WB Operating, LLC.

== See also ==
- List of tallest buildings in San Diego
