= U.S. National Bank Building =

U.S. National Bank Building, short for United States National Bank Building, may refer to:

in the United States (by state, then city):

- The Executive Complex, San Diego, California – formerly known as the U.S. National Bank Building
- The Bank Lofts, formerly known as the U.S. National Bank Building, Denver, Colorado, listed on the U.S. National Register of Historic Places (NRHP) under that earlier name
- United States National Bank Building, Portland, Oregon, NRHP-listed
- U.S. National Bank Building (Galveston, Texas), NRHP-listed in Galveston County
- U.S. National Bank Building (Vancouver, Washington), NRHP-listed in Clark County
