= The Grande at Santa Fe Place =

High-rise residential building in San Diego, California, United States

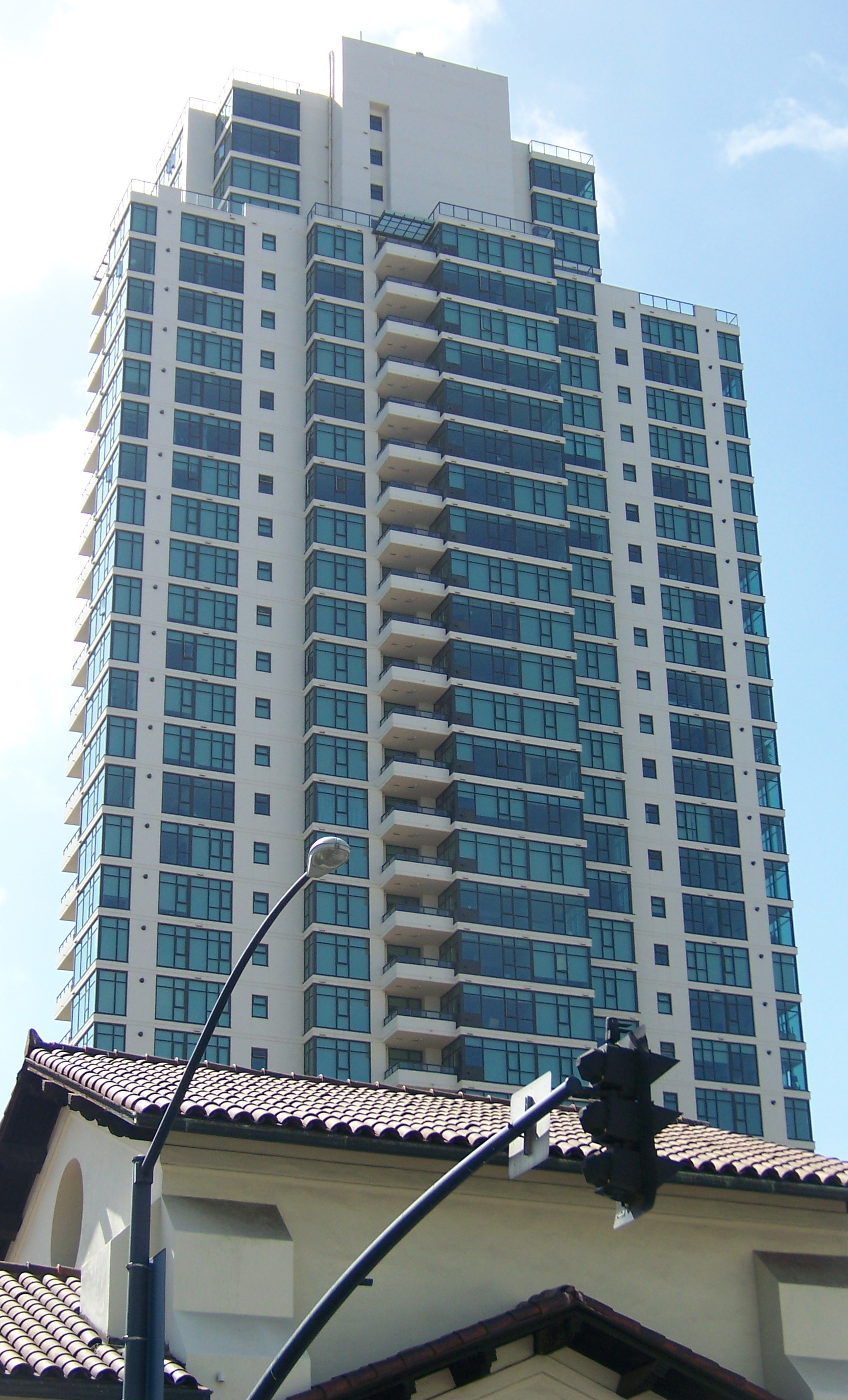
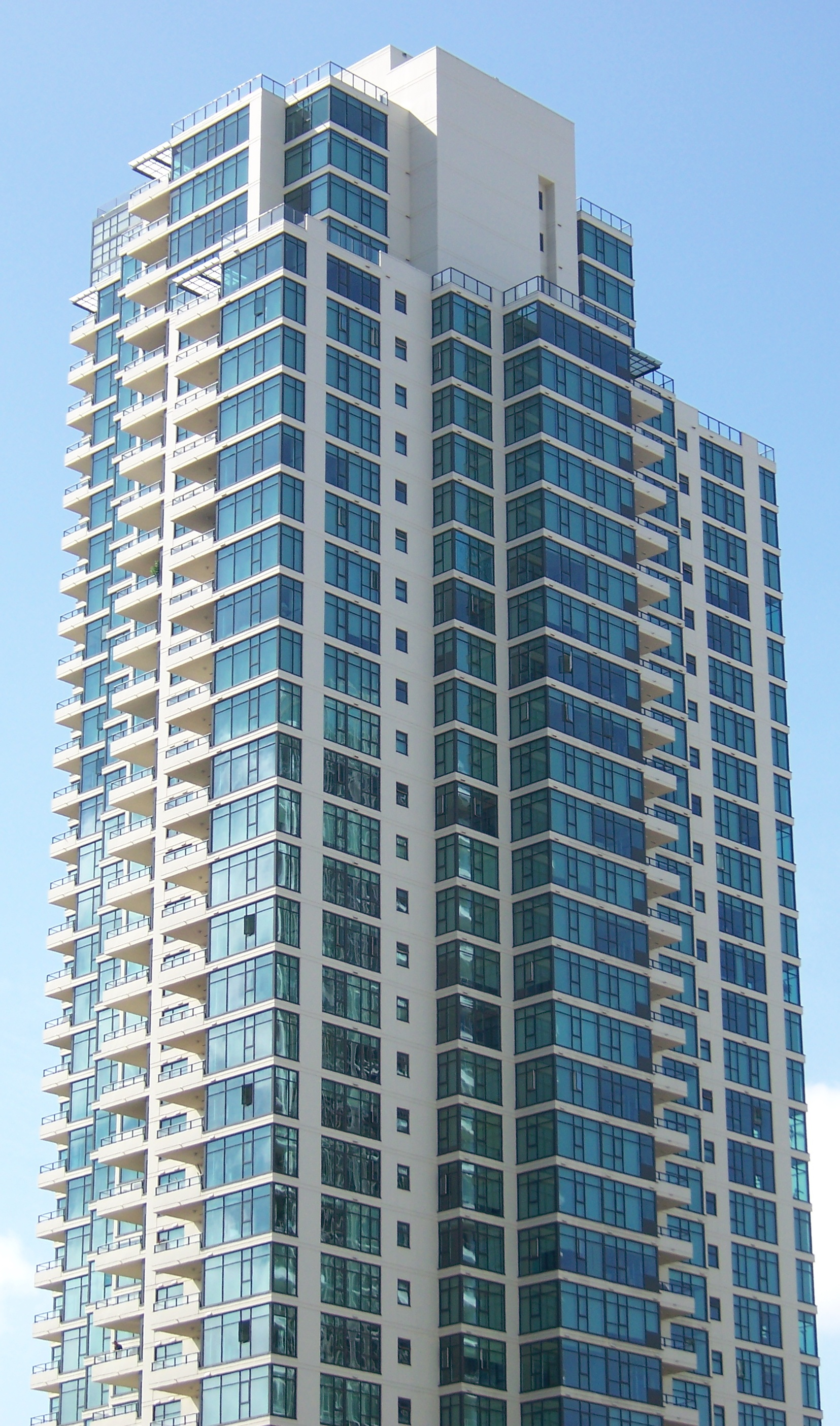
- North and South towers in April 2009
- Interactive map of the The Grande at Santa Fe Place area

General information
- Type: Residential
- Location: San Diego, California, U.S.
- Coordinates: 32°43′4″N 117°10′14″W
- Construction started: April 25, 2002 (South Tower); 2003 (North Tower)
- Completed: 2004 (South Tower); 2005 (North Tower)

Height
- Antenna spire: None
- Roof: 420 ft (130 m)

Technical details
- Floor count: 39
- Lifts/elevators: 4 (each tower)

Design and construction
- Architects: Perkins & Company Architecture and Urban Design Inc.
- Main contractor: BOSA Development Corp.

The Grande at Santa Fe Place is a high-rise residential building in San Diego, California, United States, composed of two towers of equal height. The 39-story towers have a height of 420 feet (130 m) and are a prominent fixture in San Diego's skyline. Located in the Core district of downtown San Diego, The Grande at Santa Fe Place was designed by the architect firm Perkins & Company Architecture and Urban Design Inc. The towers are currently tied with Vantage Pointe Condominium as the tenth-tallest buildings in San Diego.

== History ==
The two towers were constructed by Downtown San Diego's largest developer of residential property, BOSA Development Corp., and were designed by Perkins & Company Architecture and Urban Design Inc. Construction for the South Tower began on April 25, 2002 and was completed in 2004. The North Tower's construction began in 2003 and ended in 2005.

== Design ==
Each tower features 221 residential units, and is based on late-modernist architectural style.

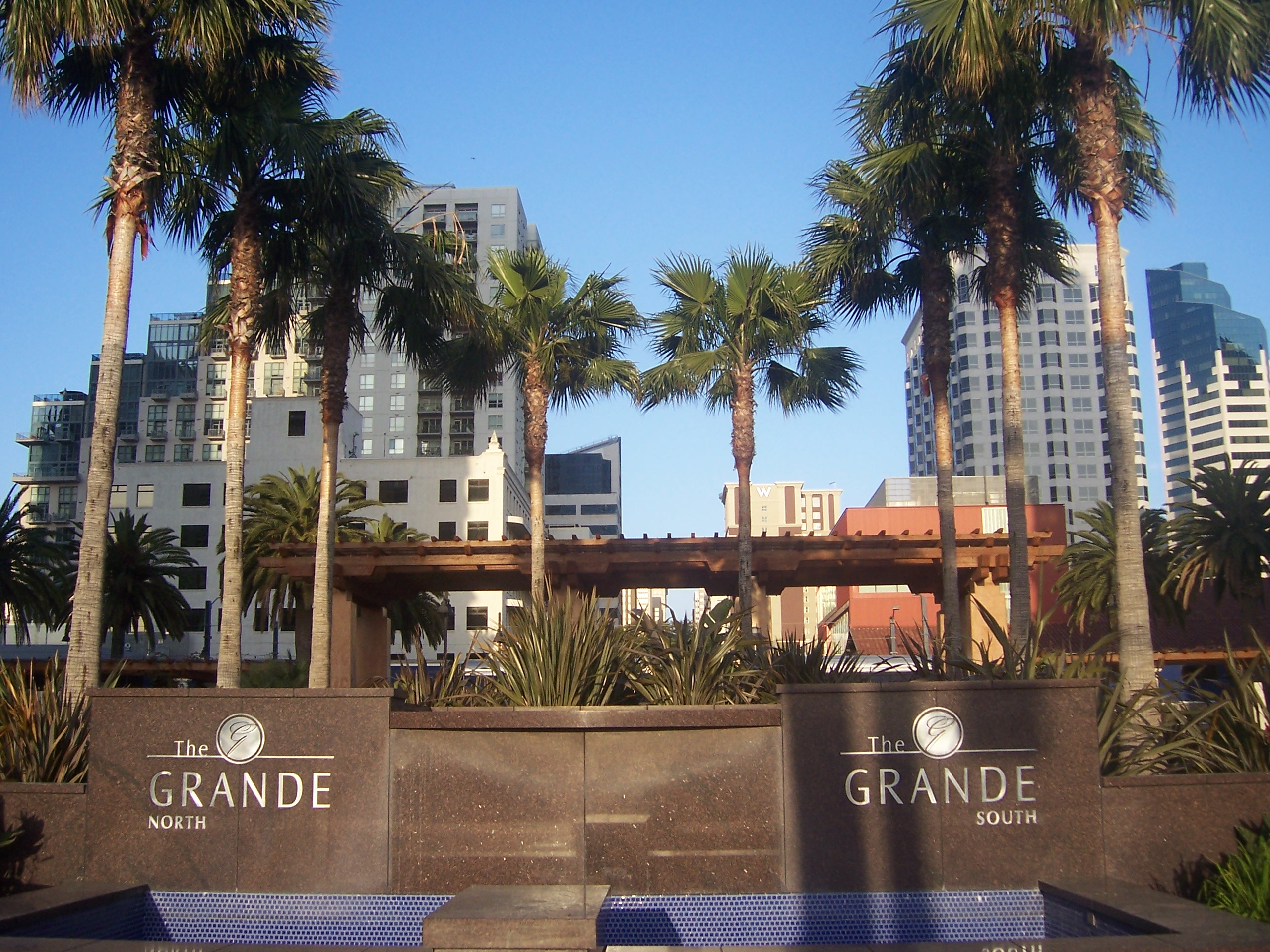
Entrance to the two towers.

== See also ==
- List of tallest buildings in San Diego
