= 530 B Street =

Skyscraper in San Diego, California

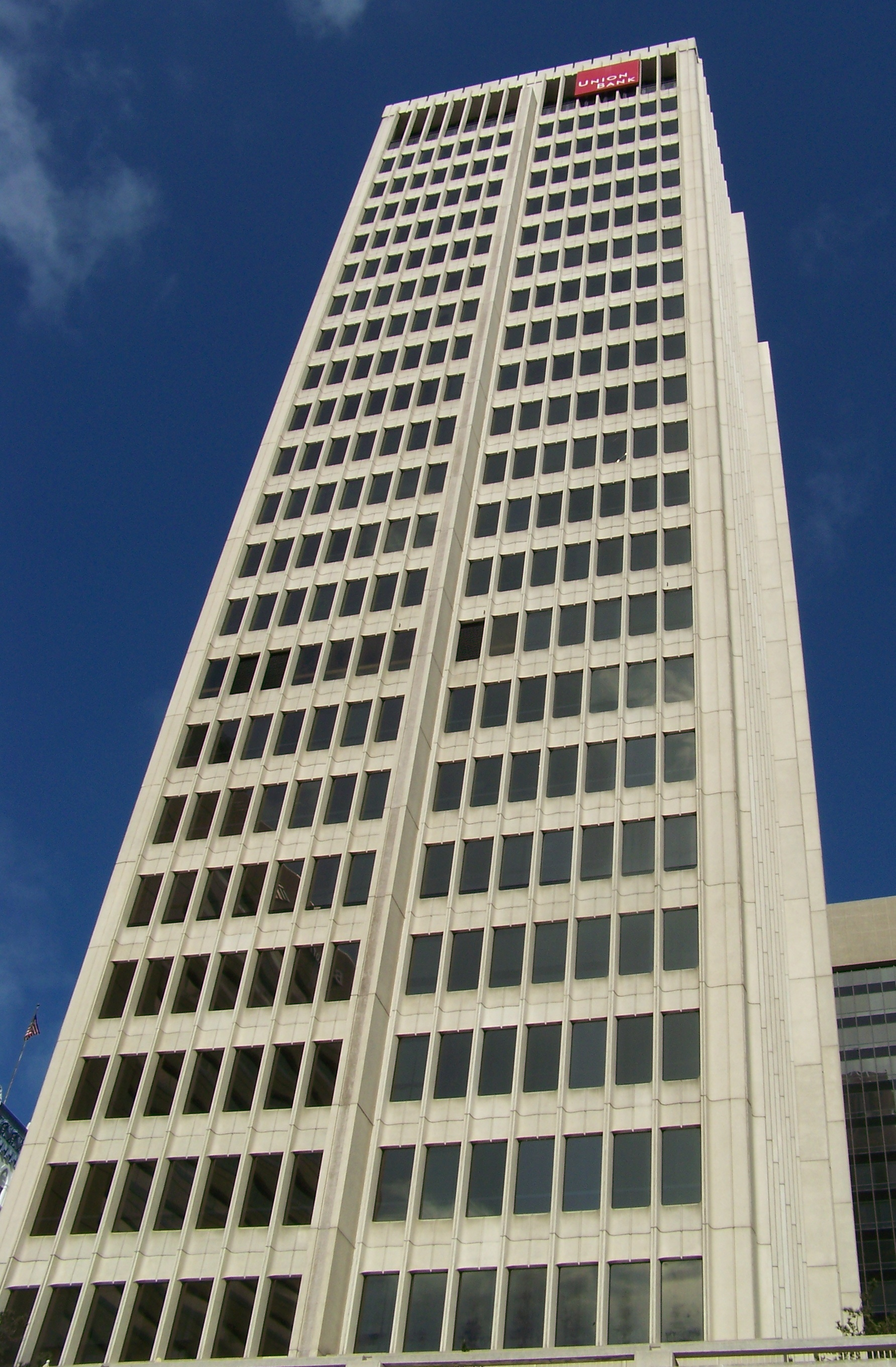
- 530 B St in 2009
- Alternative names: Southern California First National Bank Building; California First Bank Building; Union Bank of California Building

General information
- Type: Commercial offices
- Architectural style: International style
- Location: 530 B Street; San Diego, California
- Coordinates: 32.717514°N 117.159738°W
- Construction started: 1967
- Completed: 1969
- Owner: Ambient Communities

Height
- Roof: 388 ft (118 m)

Technical details
- Floor count: 24

Design and construction
- Architect: Tucker Sadler Noble Castro Architects

Other information
- Parking: 150

530 B Street (formerly known as the Union Bank of California Building) is a 27-story, 118.26-metre (388.0 ft) skyscraper in San Diego, California.

== History ==
Completed in 1969, for 20 years the tower stood as the tallest building in San Diego, until the completion of the Symphony Towers in 1989.

In 2014, Kearny Real Estate Co. acquired the property and undertook a $15 million renovation The renovation included updated restrooms and redesigned floor lobbies.

In 2016, Canadian-based Bosa Development purchased the building from Kearny. The tower was acquired by Ambient Communities in 2024 for approximately $27.5 million.

== See also ==
- List of tallest buildings in San Diego
