= Emerald Plaza =

Building in San Diego

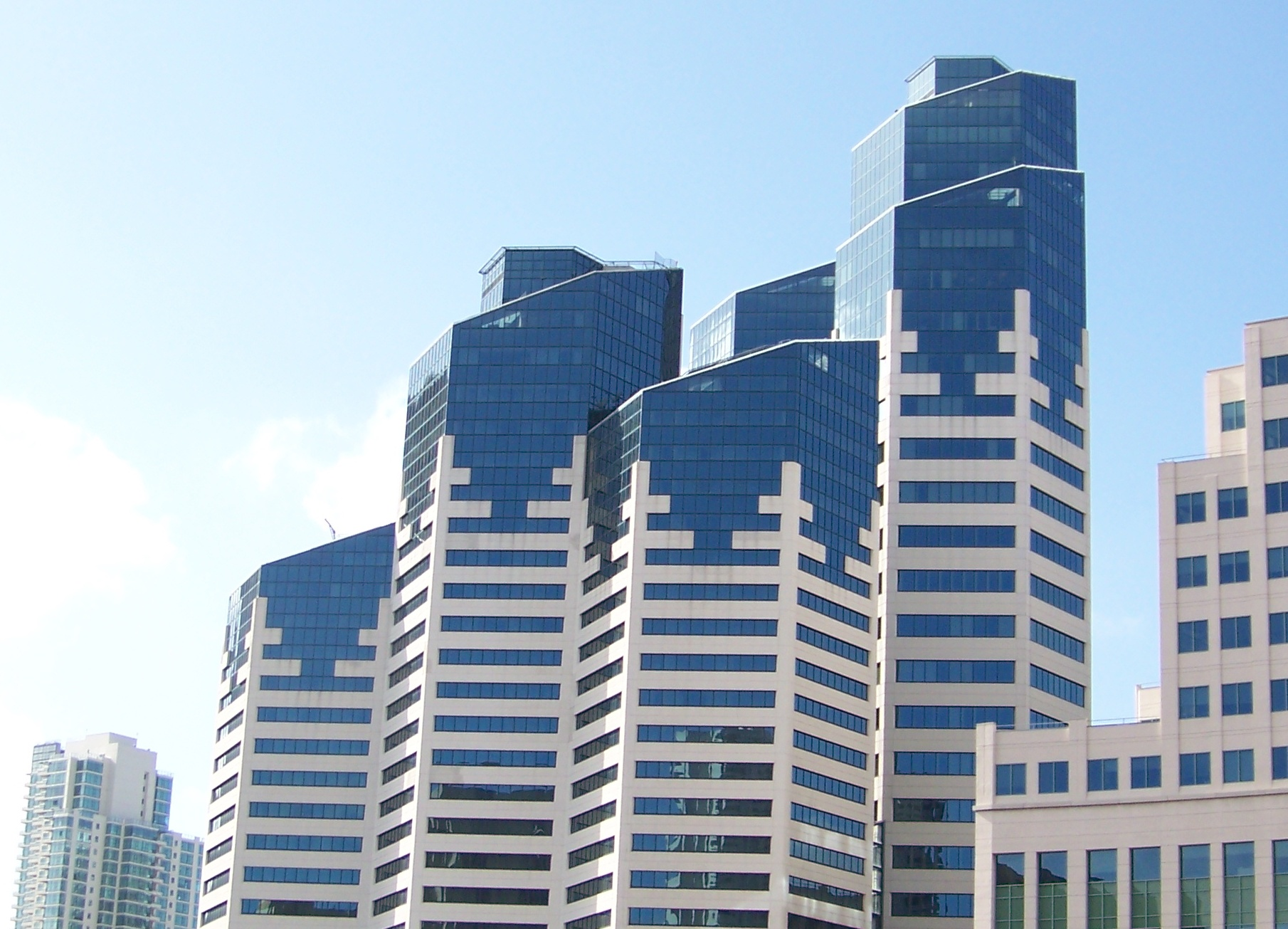
- Interactive map of the Emerald Plaza area

General information
- Type: Corporate Offices/Retail
- Location: San Diego, California, 402 W. Broadway
- Coordinates: 32°42′59″N 117°10′1″W
- Completed: 1990

Height
- Antenna spire: None
- Roof: 450 ft (140 m)

Technical details
- Floor count: 30

Design and construction
- Architects: C.W. Kim Architects & Planners

Emerald Plaza, originally known as the Emerald Shapery Center, is a skyscraper in San Diego, California. Tied with Pinnacle Marina Tower, it has a height of 450 ft (137 m). Located in the Columbia district of downtown San Diego, Emerald Plaza is a distinctive complex of eight hexagonal towers with the tallest reaching 30 stories. The building was developed by Sandor Shapery in partnership with Tokyu Corporation of Japan and designed in collaboration with C.W. Kim Architects & Planners.

== History and design ==
Emerald Plaza, originally known as the Emerald Shapery Center, finished construction in early 1990 and officially opened on April 10, 1990. The building was developed by Sandor Shapery in partnership with Tokyu Corporation of Japan and designed in collaboration with local architect C.W. Kim.

The distinctive design was conceived by Shapery, who first built a model of the project before partnering with C.W. Kim Architects & Planners to develop detailed drawings. Inspired by crystal formations, Shapery designed the building to resemble eight emerald crystals growing from bedrock. The hexagonal design was chosen both for its aesthetics and practical benefits, allowing more corner offices and views than conventional square buildings while minimizing wasted space.

The complex consists of eight hexagonal towers of varying heights, with the tallest reaching 30 stories and 450 feet. The building is situated on a 5-foot deep concrete mat foundation designed to allow movement during seismic events. The project consists of two separate buildings connected by a 100-foot glass atrium: the front section houses the hotel, while the rear five towers contain approximately 375,000 square feet of office space.

When the building was designed in the mid-1980s, downtown San Diego had a height limit of 500 feet above sea level due to the proximity of Lindbergh Field airport. This restriction influenced the building's distinctive profile and contributed to its unique design among San Diego skyscrapers.

The structure's angular rooftops are designed at 33 degrees to match San Diego's latitude, maximizing sunlight exposure. Additionally, the top and bottom of the window sills are slanted to allow for more reflected sunlight to penetrate adjacent rooms, enhancing natural lighting throughout the interior spaces. The building incorporated several innovative energy conservation measures for its time, including an ice storage air conditioning system that shifted energy consumption to off-peak hours, reducing utility costs by approximately 30%.

The $115 million building features a steel frame structure with an exterior combination of green-tinted glass and polished pink granite panels set in a custom green aluminum window framing system.

At the time of its construction, one architectural critic called it "pretentious" and "discordant" with the surrounding buildings, as well as writing the building "... looks like a futuristic experiment, which is a fine thing on the drafting board but may look peculiar along staid Broadway."

The building includes a 4,500 square foot penthouse with 1,000 square feet of outdoor terraces on the 26th and 27th floors, which was reserved by Sandor Shapery as part of the development agreement. The heliport is located directly above the penthouse.

== Ownership ==
In June 2004, the building, along with the Comerica Building and Golden Eagle Plaza were sold to Triple Net Properties. As part of the deal, Emerald Plaza was sold for $100.94 million. Without any renovation, the building was sold again in November 2005 when RREEF paid $123 million.

== Hotel ==
The Westin San Diego, originally opened as the Pan Pacific Hotel in April 1991 and was operated by Tokyu Corporation of Japan, Shapery's development partner. The 435-room hotel occupied the three front towers of the complex ranging from 16 to 27 stories in height.

It has a 100 feet (30 m) high glass atrium, which contains a large green glass sculpture named "Flying Emeralds". The hotel is served by The Grill, serving Californian cuisine, and the rooms start on the fourth floor up to the Presidential Suite on the 25th (since remodeled following acquisition by Westin). The ballroom and conference facilities cover an area of 22,000 square feet, and the hotel also contains a law library. On the third floor are the "war rooms", which contains executive conference rooms with space for administrative and paralegal staff.

== Recognition ==
Emerald Plaza has been featured on the covers of numerous publications including The New York Times and USA Today. The distinctive hexagonal design has made it a recognizable landmark in San Diego's skyline, often described as one of downtown's most iconic buildings. The penthouse has been used as a film location in over 20 movies and television shows.

In 1995, the building was sold to the Emerald Plaza Corporation of Phoenix for approximately $100 million.

== See also ==
- List of tallest buildings in San Diego
