= Pacific Gate by Bosa =

Pacific Gate
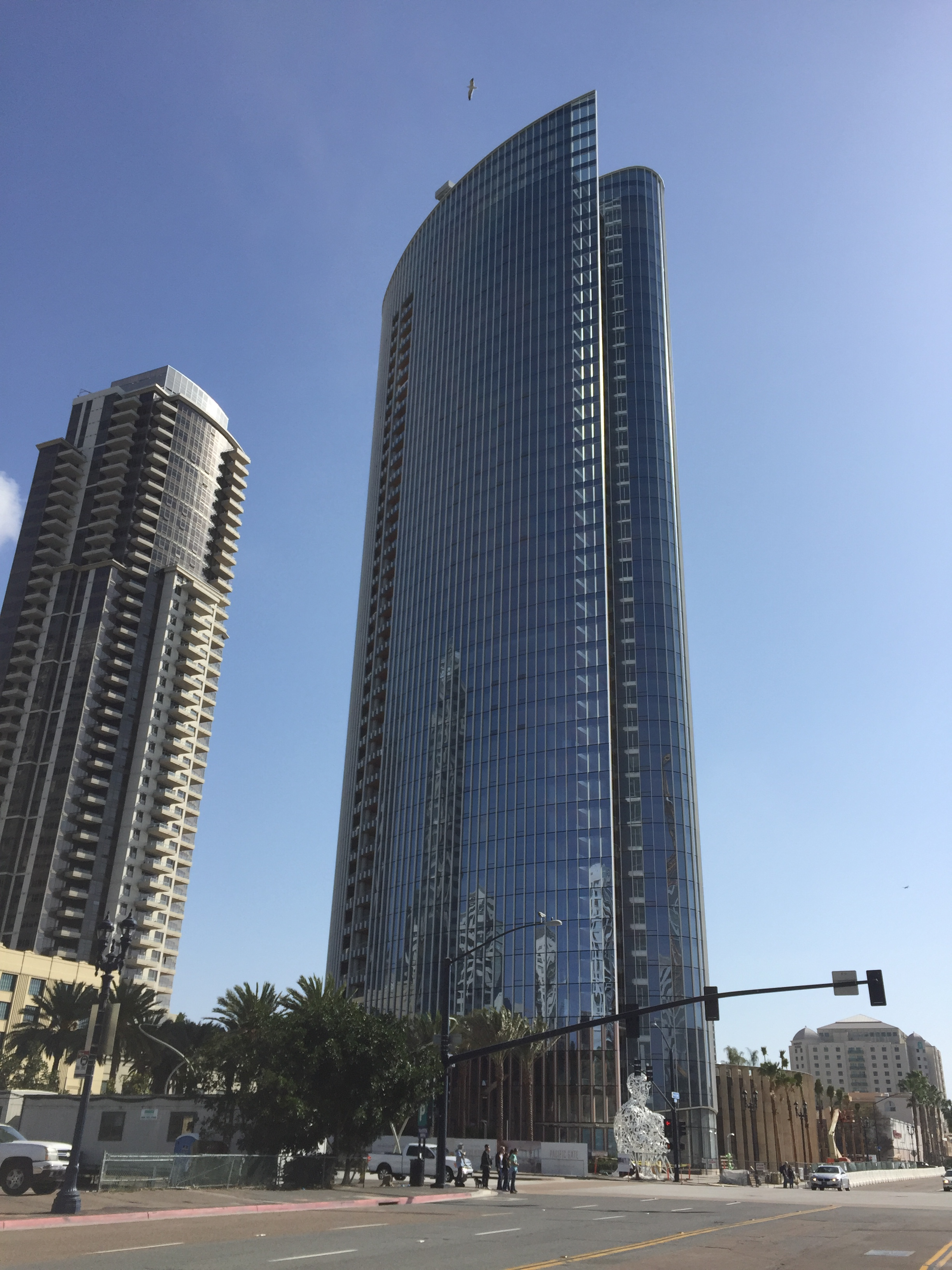
- Interactive map of the Pacific Gate area

General information
- Status: Topped-out
- Type: Residential
- Location: San Diego, California
- Coordinates: 32.7151°N 117.1706°W
- Construction started: 2015
- Completed: 2018

Height
- Roof: 450 ft (140 m)

Technical details
- Floor count: 41
- Floor area: 515,527 ft^{2} (47,894.0 m^{2})

Design and construction
- Architect: Kohn Pedersen Fox Associates
- Developer: Bosa Development Corporation, Inc.

Pacific Gate by Bosa Development is a luxury residential skyscraper in San Diego, California. The building is 458 ft (139.6 m) tall; it is the seventh tallest building in the city, tied with the Pinnacle Marina Tower. It was first proposed in 2012 and began construction in 2015. Pacific Gate contains 41 floors and 216 luxury residences. The building was completed in 2018.

== See also ==
- List of tallest buildings in San Diego
