= List of tallest buildings in San Diego =

Skyline of San Diego
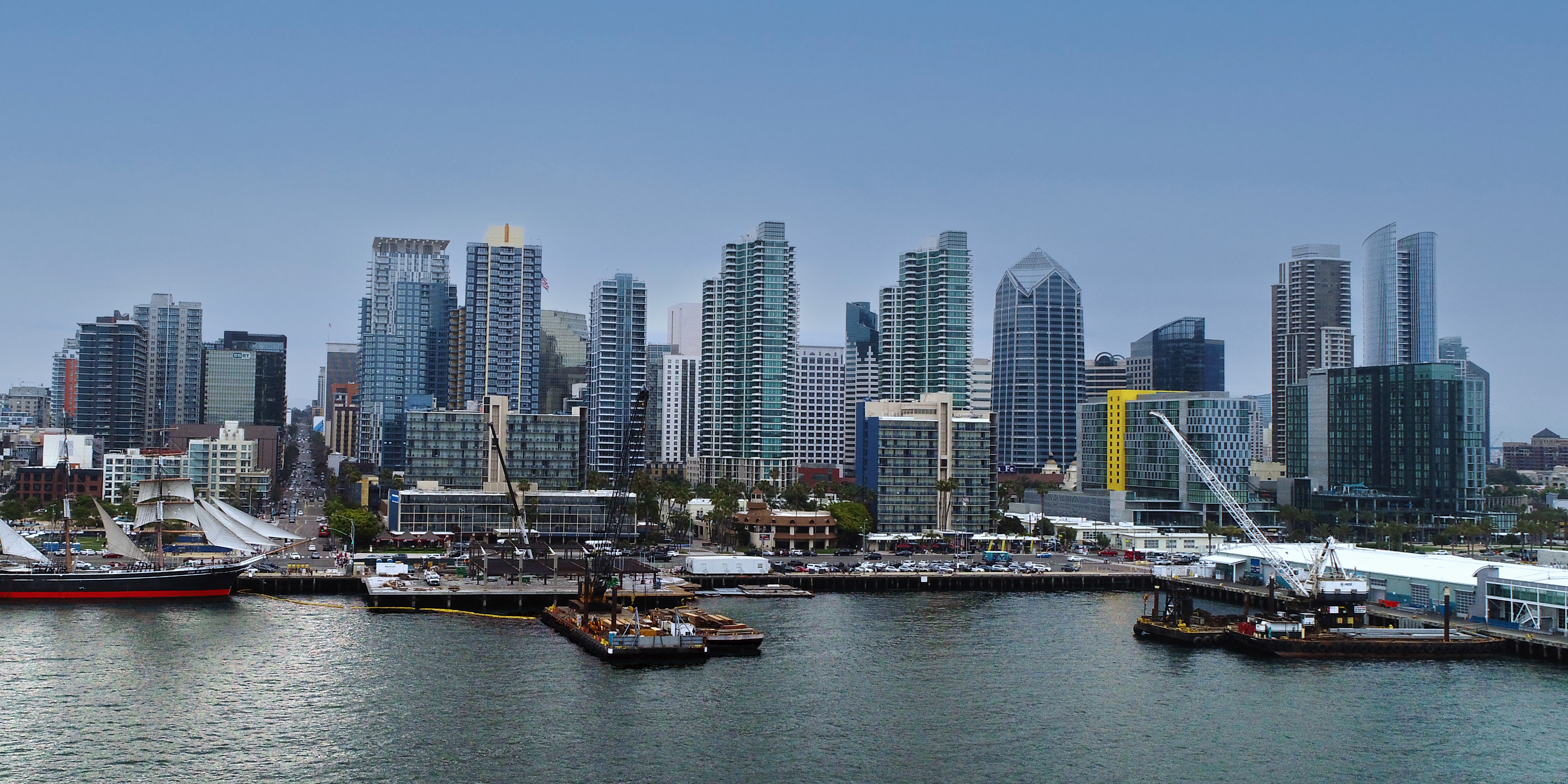
- Downtown San Diego in 2019
- Tallest building: One America Plaza (1991)
- Tallest building height: 500 ft (152.4 m)
- First 150 m+ building: Symphony Towers (1989)

Number of tall buildings (2026)
- Taller than 100 m (328 ft): 42
- Taller than 150 m (492 ft): 3

Number of tall buildings — feet
- Taller than 300 ft (91.4 m): 50

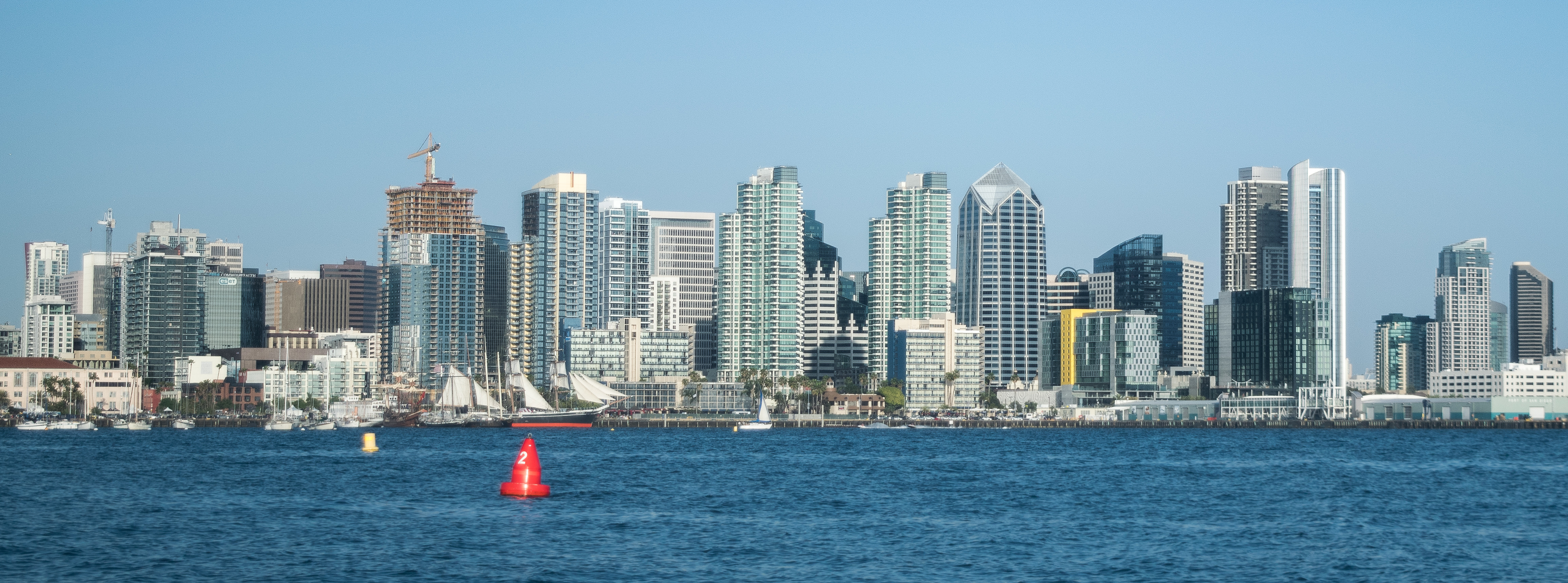
The skyline in 2018. The city's tallest building, the pyramid-topped One America Plaza, is in center-right.

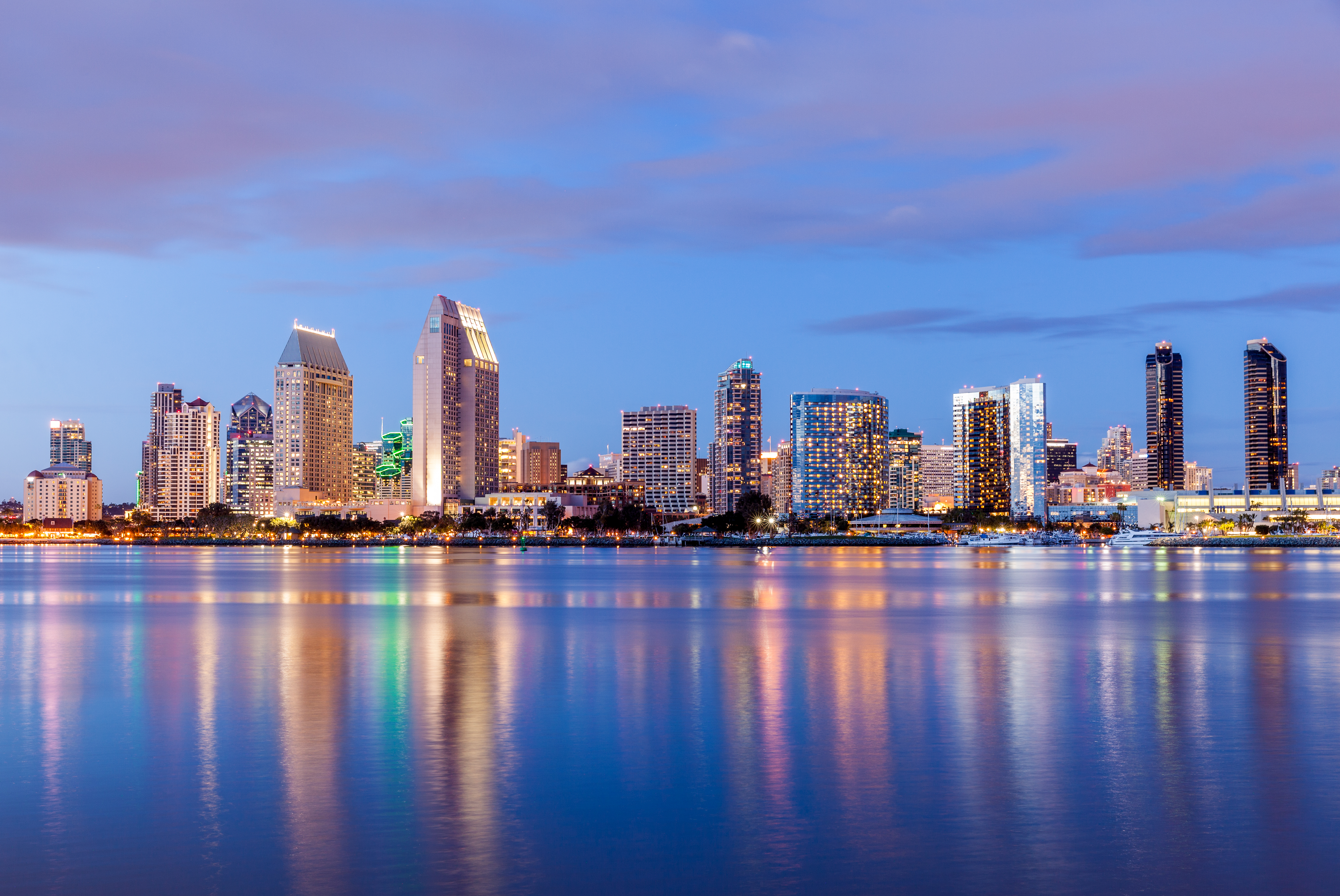
San Diego from Coronado Island in 2015

San Diego, a major coastal city in Southern California, has over 200 high-rises mainly in its central business district. The city currently has 50 buildings that stand taller than 300 feet (91 m), the third-most in California after San Francisco and Los Angeles. In the 1970s, the Federal Aviation Administration (FAA) began restricting downtown building height to a maximum of 500 feet (152 m) within a 2.3-mile (3.7 km) radius from San Diego International Airport. (Note: Information on the Federal Aviation Administration's reasoning behind building height limitations can be read in their Advisory Circular, AC 150/5190-4A – A Model Zoning Ordinance to Limit Height of Objects Around Airports) As a result, Downtown San Diego has no buildings beyond that height, and only three buildings are taller than 492 ft (150 m). The tallest building in the city is the 34-story One America Plaza, completed in 1991 which stands at 500 ft (152 m) tall.

The history of skyscrapers in San Diego began with the completion of the U.S. Grant Hotel in 1910. Standing at 211 ft (64 m), it was the tallest building in the city for 17 years, symbolizing early 20th century economic growth and urban development. In 1927, the El Cortez Hotel surpassed it with a height of 310 ft (94 m), becoming a prominent landmark and reflecting the city's expanding ambitions during the Roaring Twenties. For much of the mid-20th century, high-rise development in San Diego remained modest compared to other major American cities, largely due to the city's size and geographic constraints. A significant shift occurred in 1969 when 530 B Street was completed, reaching 388 ft (118 m) and holding the title of tallest building for two decades. This period marked the beginning of more modern office towers and a move toward vertical urbanization.

An uptick in construction took place from the 1980s to the early 1990s, which saw the emergence of major skyscrapers such as the Symphony Towers, completed in 1989 at 499 feet (152 m), and One America Plaza, which overtook it in 1991. All three buildings that surpassed 492 ft (150 m) in height were completed between 1989 and 1992. The late 1990s and 2000s onwards saw a surge in new high-rise construction, particularly residential skyscrapers, which introduced twin tower designs and modern architectural styles to the city. This era coincided with broader urban renewal efforts aimed at revitalizing downtown neighborhoods and accommodating a growing population seeking urban living. In contrast to Los Angeles and San Francisco, over half of the city's 300-foot buildings were completed after 2000.

The FAA's height restrictions created a skyline that is relatively uniform in height, compared to other American cities. As a result, San Diego's skyline is often noted for its integration with the natural coastal environment, preserving sight lines to the bay and surrounding hills. While most tall buildings are located in the downtown area, there are also a number of residential high-rises in the University City neighborhood. South of the Mexico–United States border is the Mexican city of Tijuana, which has a significant skyline of its own. San Diego and Tijuana form the San Diego–Tijuana trans border agglomeration, which together has nearly 50 buildings taller than 100 m (328 ft).

== History ==
Number of buildings by height in San Diego by the end of each year. Click on the legend to toggle a specific height on or off. View chart definition.

After the completion of Cortez Hotel in 1927, it remained the tallest building in San Diego for 36 years, until it was surpassed by the Executive Complex in 1963.

The FAA's height restrictions—introduced in the 1970s due to the proximity of San Diego International Airport—limited downtown building heights to a maximum of 500 feet (152 m). This restriction has significantly influenced the architectural character and scale of San Diego's skyline, resulting in a cluster of buildings that generally adhere to the 500-foot limit. This has created a relatively uniform skyline height compared to other major cities, with an emphasis on horizontal spread and mid-rise development in surrounding neighborhoods. The late 1990s and 2000s saw a surge in new high-rise construction, particularly residential skyscrapers, which introduced twin tower designs and modern architectural styles to the city. This era coincided with broader urban renewal efforts aimed at revitalizing downtown neighborhoods and accommodating a growing population seeking urban living.

I believe that our skyline is a collective composition of many buildings. We don't have to have one landmark like the Empire State Building or Petronas towers. I think the landmark is the entire Downtown.

— Garry Papers, manager of architecture and planning for the Center City Development Corporation

As of January 2026, there have been 10 buildings that have been proposed, approved, undergoing review, or are currently undergoing construction which will join the tallest buildings in San Diego (over 300 feet).

== Cityscape ==
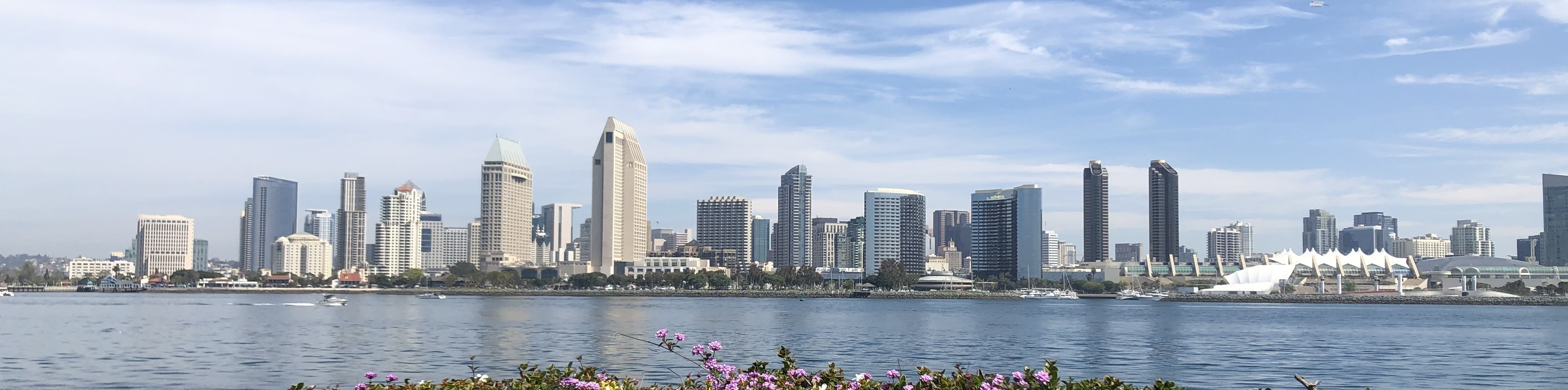
San Diego skyline from Coronado Island in 2021, looking northeast (Click or hover over image to identify buildings)

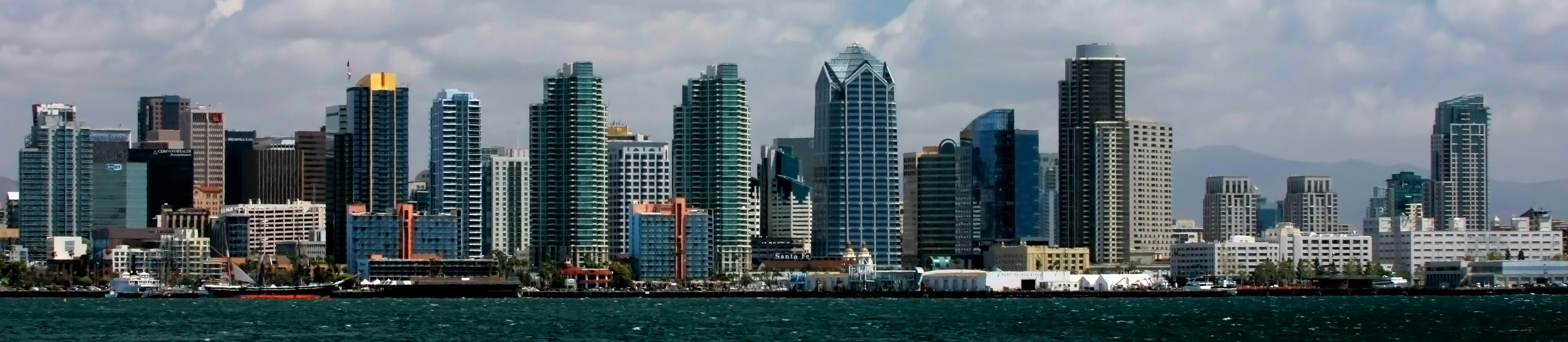
Downtown San Diego skyline in 2009, looking eastwards towards the northern part of the Embarcadero.

== Map of tallest buildings ==
The map below shows the location of buildings taller than 300 feet (61 m) in San Diego. Each marker is numbered by height and colored by the decade of the building's completion.

Buildings taller than 300 ft (91 m) in San Diego
- 1950s and below
- 1960s
- 1970s
- 1980s
- 1990s
- 2000s
- 2010s
- 2020s
1 One America Plaza
2 Symphony Towers
3 Manchester Grand Hyatt Tower I
4 Pinnacle on the Park I
5 Pinnacle on the Park II
6 Electra
7 Pacific Gate
8 Pinnacle Marina Tower
9 Emerald Plaza
10 Manchester Grand Hyatt Tower II
11 Diega South Tower
12 800 Broadway
13 West
14 Harbor Club West
15 Harbor Club East
16 The Grande South at Santa Fe Place
17 The Grande North at Santa Fe Place
18 Vantage Pointe Condominium
19 Savina San Diego Condominiums
20 The Lindley
21 655 West Broadway
22 Simone Little Italy
23 Park 12
24 Bayside at the Embarcadero
25 530 B Street
26 San Diego Central Courthouse
27 Hilton San Diego Bayfront
28 The Mark
29 1 Columbia Place
30 Sapphire Tower
31 Omni San Diego Hotel
32 Meridian Condominiums
33 Marriott Marquis San Diego Marina Tower I
34 Marriott Marquis San Diego Marina Tower II
35 The Merian
36 Imperial Bank Tower
37 Tower 180
38 101 W Broadway
39 600 B Street
40 James M. Carter and Judith N. Keep United States Courthouse
41 Wells Fargo Plaza
42 525 B Street
43 11th and Broadway Tower 2
44 El Cortez
45 11th and Broadway Tower 1
46 Rise
47 225 Broadway
48 The Rey
49 Marriott Vacation Club Pulse

== Tallest buildings ==
This list ranks San Diego skyscrapers that stand at least 300 feet (91 m) tall as of 2026, based on standard height measurement. This includes spires and architectural details but does not include antenna masts. The "Year" column indicates the year in which a building was completed

Was the tallest building in San Diego upon completion

Rank	Name	Image	Location	Height ft (m)	Floors	Year	Purpose	Notes
1	One America Plaza		32°42′57″N 117°10′7″W	500 (152.4)	34	1991	Office	Tallest building in the city since 1991; tallest building in California outside of Los Angeles and San Francisco.
2	Symphony Towers	Symphony Towers	32°43′6″N 117°9′28″W	499 (152)	34	1989	Mixed-use	Tallest building in San Diego from 1989 to 1991. Mixed-use office and hotel building.
3	Manchester Grand Hyatt San Diego		32°42′34″N 117°10′4″W	497 (151.5)	40	1992	Hotel	Tallest building on the waterfront on the West Coast of the United States. Tallest hotel building in San Diego.
4	Pinnacle on the Park I	Pinnacle on the Park I	32°42′35″N 117°09′03″W	479 (146)	45	2015	Residential	Tallest residential tower in San Diego together with the Pinnacle II tower.
5	Pinnacle on the Park II	Pinnacle on the Park II	32°42′36.7″N 117°09′02.9″W	479 (146)	45	2019	Residential	Tallest residential tower in San Diego together with the Pinnacle I tower. Also known as Spire San Diego.
6	Electra	Electra	32°42′54.8″N 117°10′10.5″W	475 (144.8)	43	2008	Residential	
7	Pacific Gate by Bosa	Pacific Gate	32°42′54″N 117°10′14″W	458 (139.6)	41	2017	Residential	
8	Pinnacle Marina Tower	Pinnacle Marina Tower	32°42′39″N 117°9′54″W	455 (138.7)	36	2005	Residential	
9	Emerald Plaza	Emerald Plaza	32°42′58″N 117°10′1″W	450 (137.2)	30	1990	Mixed-use	Mixed-use office and hotel building with retail.
10	Manchester Grand Hyatt Seaport	Manchester Grand Hyatt Seaport	32°42′37″N 117°10′6″W	446 (135.9)	34	2003	Hotel	
11	The Torrey	–	32°43′6″N 117°9′55″W	445 (136)	34	2026	Mixed-use	
12	Diega South Tower	–	32°42′57.2″N 117°09′28.5″W	440 (134.1)	41	2020	Residential	
13	800 Broadway	–	32°42′58″N 117°9′25″W	440 (134)	40	2024	Residential	Contains retail units.
14	West	–	32°42′58.9″N 117°9′54.4″W	425 (129.4)	37	2024	Mixed-use	Mixed-use residential and office building with retail. The project also included $80 million tunnel. Also known as Courthouse Commons.
15	Harbor Club West	Harbor Club West	32°42′32″N 117°9′46″W	424 (129.2)	41	1992	Residential	
16	Harbor Club East	Harbor Club East	32°42′31″N 117°9′44″W	424 (129.2)	41	1992	Residential	
17	The Grande South at Santa Fe Place	The Grande South at Santa Fe Place	32°43′2″N 117°10′13″W	420 (128)	39	2004	Residential	
18	The Grande North at Santa Fe Place	The Grande North at Santa Fe Place	32°43′5″N 117°10′13″W	420 (128)	39	2005	Residential	
19	Vantage Pointe Condominium	Vantage Pointe Condominium	32°43′6″N 117°9′21″W	420 (128)	41	2009	Residential	
20	Savina San Diego Condominiums	Savina by Bosa	32°43′10″N 117°10′10″W	415 (126.5)	36	2018	Residential	
21	The Lindley	–	32°43′9″N 117°10′2″W	415 (126.5)	37	2024	Residential	Contains retail units.
22	655 West Broadway	First Allied Plaza	32°42′55″N 117°10′7″W	413 (126)	23	2005	Mixed-use	Formerly known as Advanced Equities Plaza from 2007 to 2012, and First Allied Plaza from 2012 to 2024. Mixed-use residential and office building with retail.
23	Simone Little Italy	–	32°43′12″N 117°09′55″W	409 (124.7)	36	2023	Residential	Also known as Union & Ash.
24	Park 12		32°42′23.3″N 117°9′18.4″W	402 (122.5)	36	2018	Residential	Also known as Ballpark Village. Contains retail units.
25	Bayside at the Embarcadero		32°43′9″N 117°10′14″W	395 (120.4)	36	2009	Residential	
26	530 B Street	530 B Street	32°43′5.7″N 117°9′35.1″W	388 (118.3)	27	1969	Office	Tallest building in San Diego from 1969 to 1989. Formerly known as the Union Bank of California Building until 2022.
27	San Diego Central Courthouse	San Diego Central Courthouse	32°43′2″N 117°9′58″W	387 (118)	22	2017	Office	
28	Hilton San Diego Bayfront		32°42′11″N 117°9′31″W	385 (117.3)	32	2008	Hotel	
29	The Mark	The Mark	32°42′40″N 117°9′25″W	381 (116.1)	33	2007	Residential	
30	1 Columbia Place	One Columbia Place	32°43′5″N 117°10′1″W	381 (116)	27	1982	Office	Also known as First National Bank Center.
31	Sapphire Tower		32°43′6″N 117°10′10″W	380 (115.8)	32	2008	Residential	
32	Omni San Diego Hotel		32°42′25.6″N 117°9′32″W	375 (114.3)	34	2004	Hotel	
33	Meridian Condominiums	Meridian Condominiums	32°42′47″N 117°9′54″W	371 (113.1)	28	1985	Residential	
34	Marriott Marquis San Diego Marina Tower I	Marriott Hotel and Marina Tower I	32°42′28″N 117°9′54″W	361 (110)	25	1984	Hotel	Completed three years earlier than its twin counterpart. Operated as the Inter-Continental San Diego until 1987.
35	Marriott Marquis San Diego Marina Tower II	Marriott Hotel and Marina Tower II	32°42′30″N 117°9′57″W	361 (110)	25	1987	Hotel	
36	The Merian	–	32°42′43.7″N 117°9′15.9″W	358 (109)	34	2020	Residential	
37	Imperial Bank Tower	Imperial Bank Tower	32°43′2″N 117°9′28″W	354 (108)	24	1982	Office	
38	Tower 180	Executive Complex	32°42′57″N 117°9′47″W	350 (106.7)	25	1963	Office	Tallest building in San Diego from 1963 to 1969.
39	101 W Broadway	AT&T Building	32°42′54″N 117°9′51″W	348 (106.1)	20	1982	Office	Formerly known as the AT&T Building.
40	600 B Street		32°43′5″N 117°9′31″W	339 (103.3)	23	1974	Office	Formerly known as the San Diego Union Tribune Building until 2023.
41	James M. Carter and Judith N. Keep United States Courthouse	James M. Carter and Judith N. Keep United States Courthouse	32°42′54″N 117°9′57″W	333 (101.5)	16	2012	Office	
42	Wells Fargo Plaza	Wells Fargo Plaza	32°43′2″N 117°9′38″W	331 (100.9)	23	1984	Office	
43	525 B Street		32°43′03″N 117°09′35″W	322 (98) (Note: Sources do not state the exact height of this building. This figure was determined using Google Earth by subtracting the altitude of the building entrance from the highest architectural point.)	22	1969	Office	Also known as the Procopio Tower and formerly known as Golden Eagle Plaza.
44	11th and Broadway Tower 2	–	32°42′55″N 117°09′16″W	319 (97.2)	32	2024	Residential	Part of the Broadway Towers development. Contains retail units.
45	El Cortez		32°43′13.4″N 117°9′28.6″W	310 (94.5)	14	1927	Residential	Tallest building in San Diego from 1927 to 1963.
46	11th and Broadway Tower 1	–	32°42′54″N 117°09′15″W	310 (94.5)	31	2024	Residential	Part of the Broadway Towers development. Contains retail units.
47	Rise	–	32°42′52″N 117°10′18″W	307 (94)	15	2024	Office	Part of the IQHQ's Research and Development District (RaDD)
48	225 Broadway	225 Broadway	32°42′54″N 117°9′44″W	306 (93)	22	1975	Office	
49	The Rey	–	32°43′6″N 117°9′55″W	305 (93)	25	2016	Residential	
50	Marriott Vacation Club Pulse		32°43′07″N 117°09′29″W	300 (91.5)	27	1990	Hotel	Formerly the Sheraton Suites. Part of the Symphony Towers complex.

== Tallest under construction or proposed ==
=== Under construction ===
This lists buildings that are under construction in San Diego and are planned to rise at least 300 feet (91 meters) as of 2026. The "year" column indicates the estimated year of completion.

Name	Coordinates	Height ft (m)	Floors	Year	Purpose	Notes
Andia	32°43′3″N 117°9′24″W	410 (125)	40	2027	Residential	Andia will be a 40-story luxury condominium tower with 393 units and ground-floor retail. Will become the tallest building in San Diego upon completion.
Le Méridien	32°43′7″N 117°10′4″W	448 (137)	39	2027	Mixed-use	Le Méridien will be a 39-story condo and hotel tower.

=== Proposed ===
This lists ranks proposed buildings in San Diego that are planned to be taller than 300 ft (91 m). A dash "–“ indicates information about the building is unknown or has not been released.

Name	Coordinates	Height ft (m)	Floors	Year	Purpose	Status	Notes
1st and Island	32°42′36″N 117°9′48″W	410 (125)	35	–	Residential	Under Review	Planned 35-story residential tower, replacing a parking lot in the Gaslamp Quarter. Will be situated next to the Harbor Club towers.
444 West Beech	32°43′16″N 117°10′11″W	–	39	–	Mixed-use	Under Review	444 West Beech is a proposed 39-story mixed-use tower by Endeavor Real Estate Group, planned for the north side of Beech Street between Columbia and State in downtown San Diego. The project would include 491 apartments (37 affordable units) and about 6,938 sq. ft. of ground-floor retail.
Kettner Crossing Phase 2	32°43′16″N 117°10′11″W	–	33	–	Residential	Under Review	Phase 2 of Kettner Crossing is the next development stage of a mixed-use project in San Diego's Little Italy neighborhood. This phase includes additional residential units and retail spaces.
1950 India Street	32°43′30″N 117°10′9″W	–	26	–	Residential	Under Review	A planned mixed-use tower in Little Italy, expected to bring 444 units of residential space and 33,752 sq. ft. of retail space. The spot is currently a vacant building.
Après Little Italy	32°43′27″N 117°10′8″W	–	25	–	Residential	Under Review	Another planned mixed-use tower coming to the Little Italy area. It will feature over 150 apartments and 9,289 sq. ft. of retail space.

== Timeline of tallest buildings ==
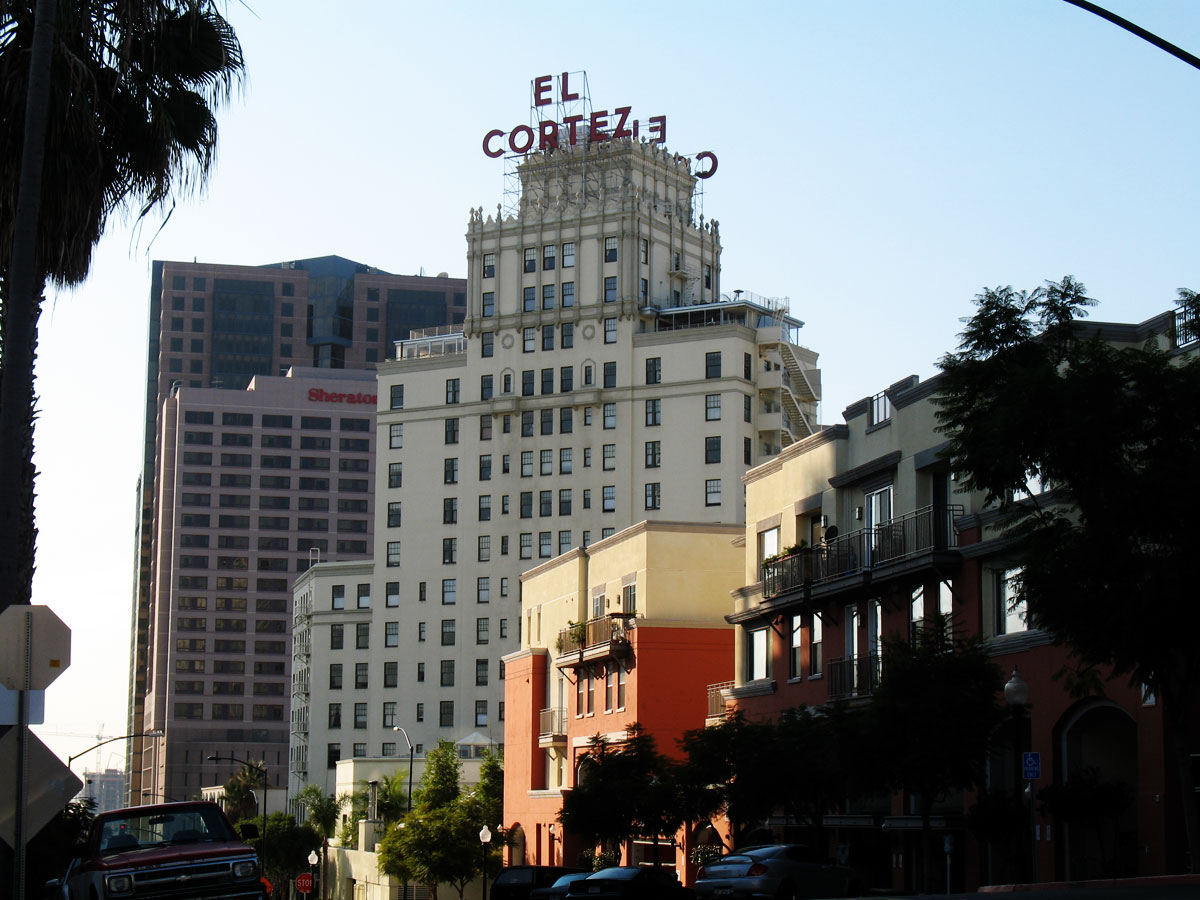
The El Cortez Building stood as the tallest building in San Diego for 36 years, from 1927 until 1963.

These are the list of buildings that have held the title of tallest building in San Diego.

Name	Image	Height ft (m)	Floors	Years as tallest	Notes
U.S. Grant Hotel	530 B Street	211 (64)	11	17 years (1910–1927)	
El Cortez Hotel	El Cortez Hotel	310 (94)	16	36 years (1927–1963)	
Tower 180	Executive Complex	350 (110)	25	6 years (1963–1969)	
530 B Street	530 B Street	388 (118)	27	20 years (1969–1989)	
Symphony Towers	Symphony Towers	499 (152)	34	2 years (1989–1991)	
One America Plaza	One America Plaza	500 (150)	34	35 years (1991–present)	

== See also ==
- List of tallest buildings in the United States
- List of tallest buildings in California
- List of tallest buildings in Los Angeles
- List of tallest buildings in San Francisco
- List of tallest buildings in Tijuana
- List of Gaslamp Quarter historic buildings
