= Symphony Towers =

Development in San Diego, California

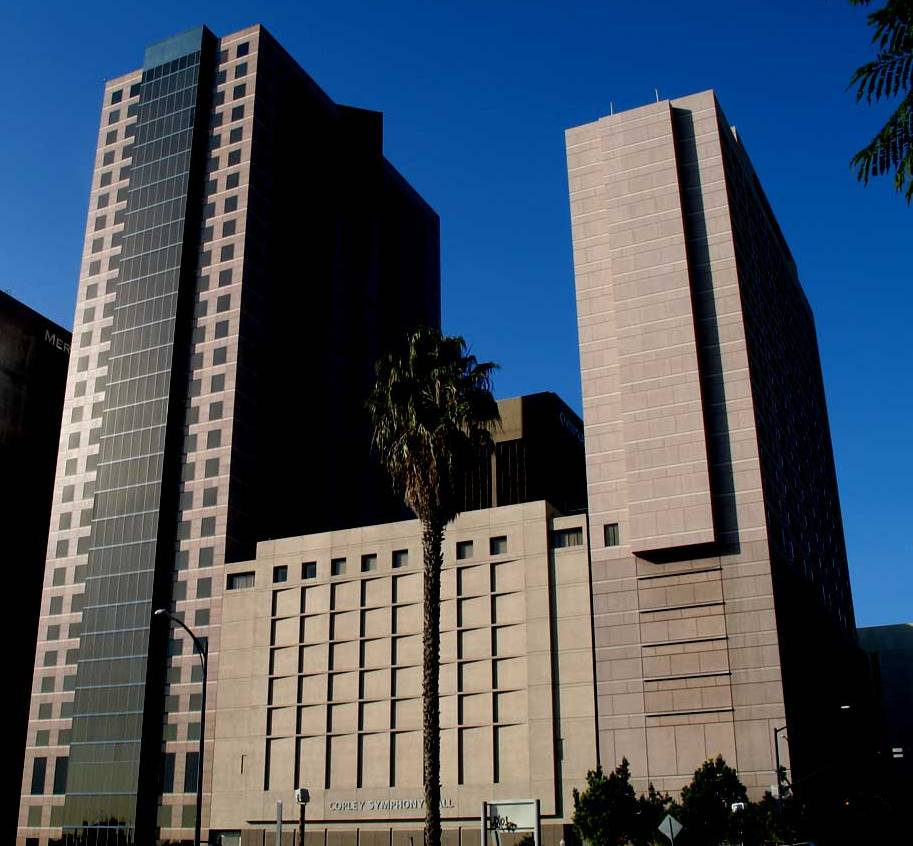
- Interactive map of the Symphony Towers area

General information
- Type: Commercial offices, hotel
- Location: 750 B Street; San Diego, California
- Coordinates: 32.718307°N 117.157855°W
- Construction started: 1986
- Completed: 1989
- Owner: Formosa, Ltd

Height
- Roof: 499 ft (152 m)

Technical details
- Floor count: 34
- Floor area: 559,000 sq ft (51,900 m^{2})

Design and construction
- Architect: Skidmore, Owings and Merrill
- Structural engineer: Skidmore, Owings and Merrill

Symphony Towers is a 1.2-million-square-foot late modernist two-tower hotel and office complex in San Diego, California, located in the historic Financial District of downtown San Diego. The mixed-use, high-rise building includes a 34-story office building with 530,000 square feet of rentable space, the 264-room Marriott Vacation Club Pulse San Diego, a five-level parking structure and the 2,255-seat Jacobs Music Center. In addition, the penthouse floor houses the exclusive University Club, and the tower has a helipad on the roof.

At 152 m (499 ft), Symphony Tower building is the second tallest skyscraper in San Diego, only one foot under One America Plaza, the city's tallest at 152.4 m (500 ft).

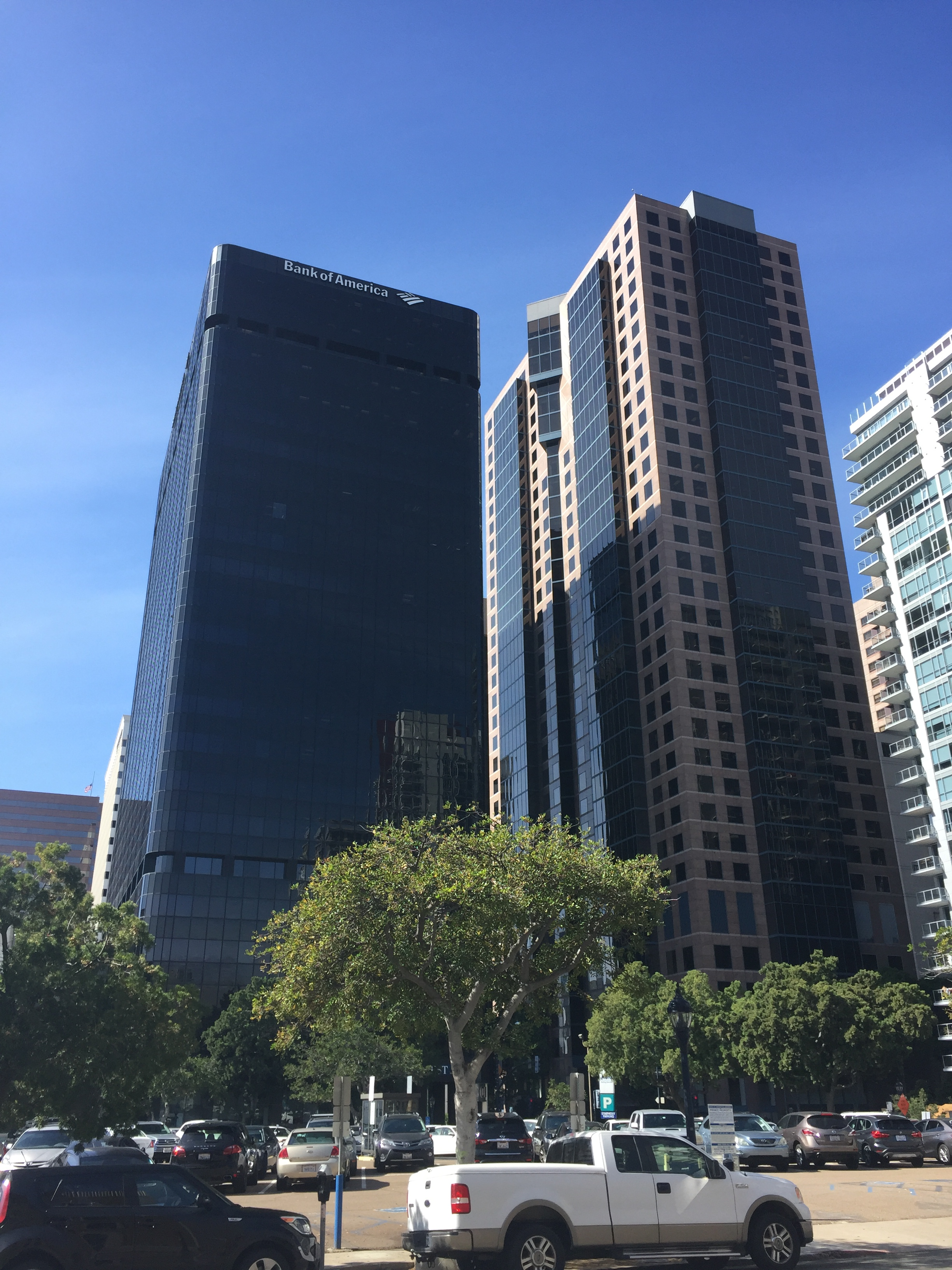
Symphony Towers and neighboring Imperial Bank Tower

Douglas P. Wilson, current chairman and C.E.O. of Douglas Wilson Companies (DWC), partnered with Charlton Raynd Ventures to develop the project which opened in 1989. In 1988, during the course of construction, the project stalled and was acquired by London & Edinburgh Investment, Inc, a subsidiary of London-listed London & Edinburgh Trust PLC. The construction was completed and the office building fully leased. The project was retained by LEI and Charlton Raynd as an investment for several years. Designed by Skidmore, Owings and Merrill, Symphony Towers is widely seen as one of downtown's premier locations.

== See also ==
- List of tallest buildings in San Diego
