= Wells Fargo Plaza (San Diego) =

Office building in California, US

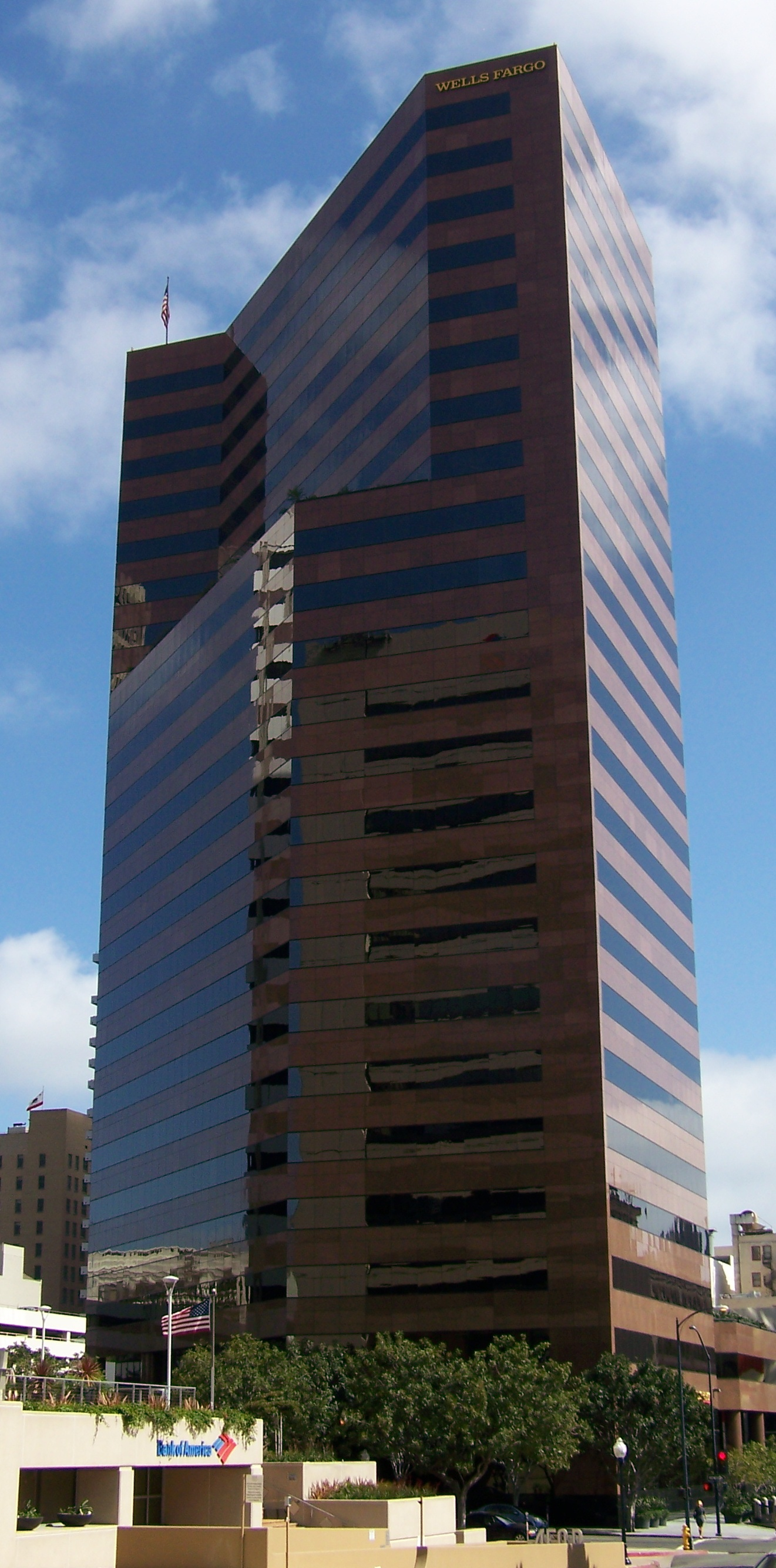
- April 2009
- Interactive map of the Wells Fargo Plaza area

General information
- Type: Office
- Location: San Diego, California
- Coordinates: 32°43′02.41″N 117°09′38.41″W
- Completed: 1984
- Owner: Prebys Foundation

Height
- Antenna spire: None
- Roof: 331 ft (101 m)

Technical details
- Floor count: 23
- Floor area: 471,976 sq ft (43,848.0 m^{2})

Design and construction
- Architect: Carrier Johnson Architects

Wells Fargo Plaza is the 26th tallest building in San Diego, California, and is a prominent fixture in San Diego's skyline. The 23-story skyscraper has a height of 339 ft (103 m) and is located in the Core district of downtown San Diego. The skyscraper utilizes a modern architectural style and was designed by the architect firm Carrier Johnson Architects.

== History ==
The building was purchased by the Irvine Company in November 2004 for $148 million.

== See also ==
- List of tallest buildings in San Diego
