= Meridian Condominiums =

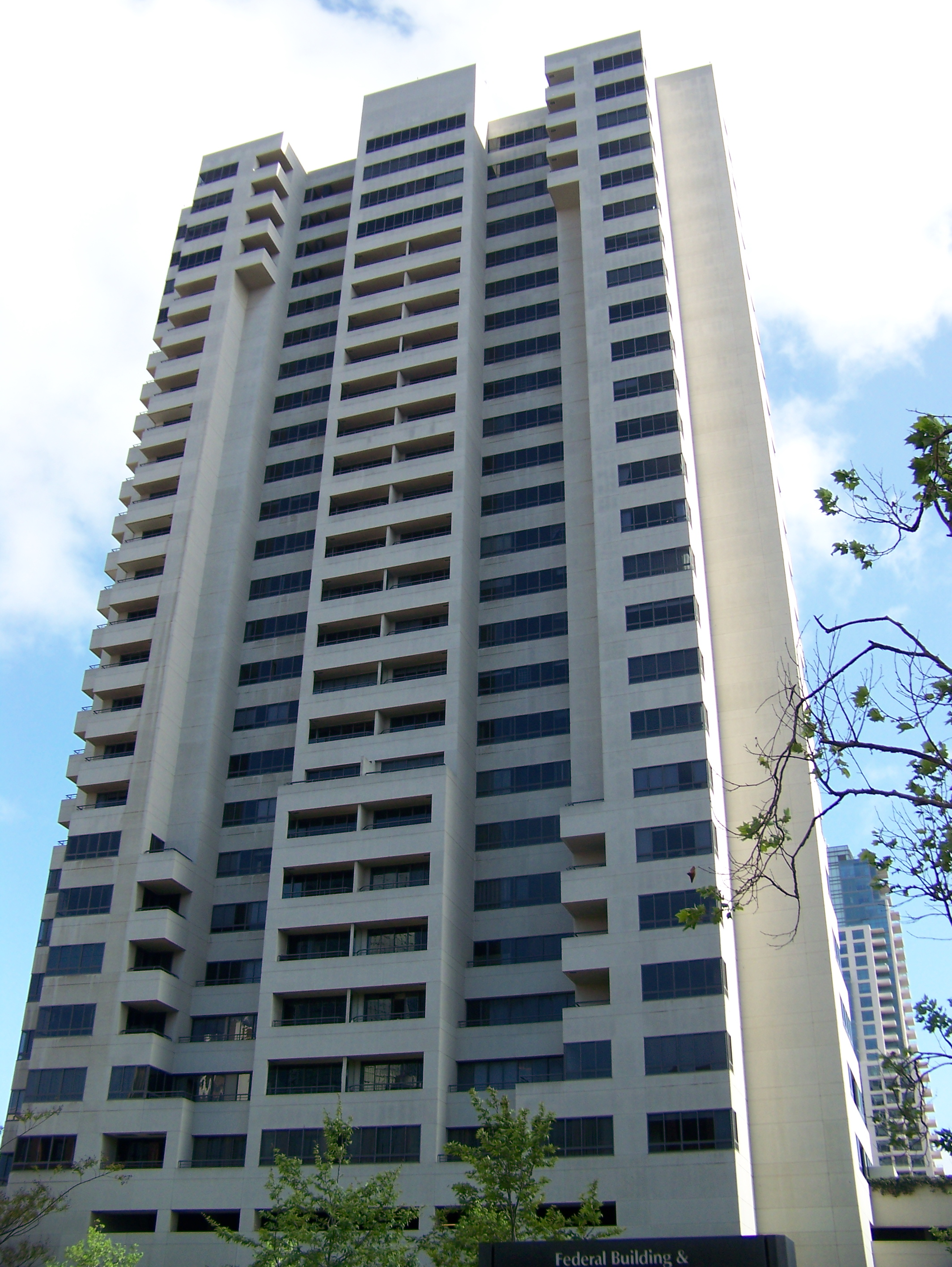
- April 2009
- Interactive map of the Meridian Condominiums area

General information
- Type: Residential
- Location: San Diego, California
- Coordinates: 32°42′48″N 117°9′55″W
- Completed: 1985
- Cost: $71.1 million

Height
- Antenna spire: None
- Roof: 371 ft (113 m)

Technical details
- Floor count: 28

Design and construction
- Architects: Maxwell Starkman & Associates
- Developer: Walter Smyk's Meridian Co. Ltd.

Meridian Condominiums is the 19th tallest building in San Diego, California, and is a prominent fixture in San Diego's skyline. It has a height of 371 ft (113 m) and contains 172 units. Located at 700 Front Street in the Horton Plaza district of downtown San Diego, Meridian Condominiums is a 28-story building that utilizes a modern architectural style. It was designed by the architect firm Maxwell Starkman & Associates. The skyscraper was built at a cost of $71.1 million.

== See also ==
- List of tallest buildings in San Diego
