= The Mark (San Diego) =

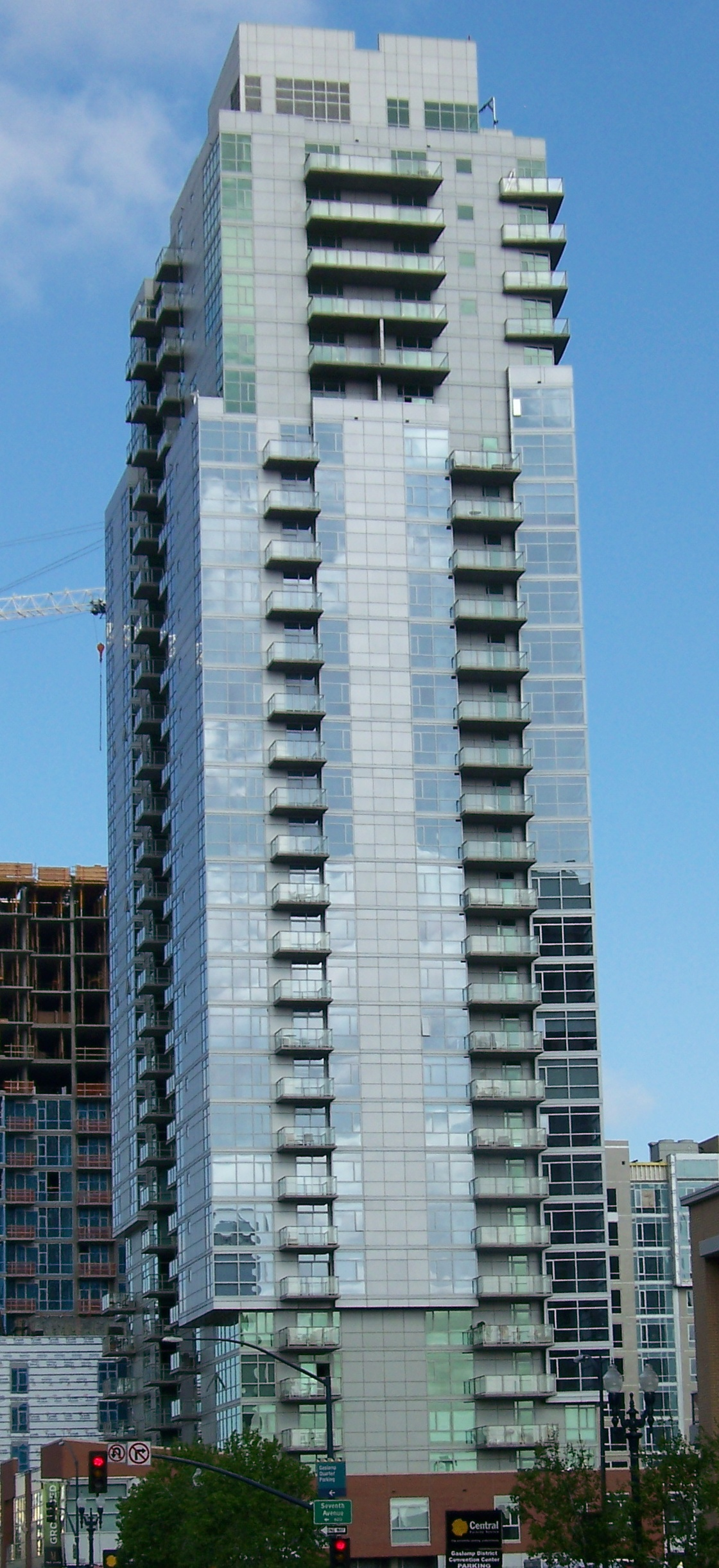
- April 2009
- Interactive map of the The Mark area

General information
- Type: Residential
- Location: San Diego, California
- Coordinates: 32°42′40″N 117°9′25″W
- Construction started: 2004
- Completed: 2007
- Opening: July 14, 2007

Height
- Antenna spire: None
- Roof: 381 ft (116 m)

Technical details
- Floor count: 33

Design and construction
- Architects: Martinez & Cutri Corp. Shears Adkins Architects, LLC
- Developer: Douglas Wilson; Douglas Wilson Companies

The Mark is a building in San Diego, California, and is a prominent fixture in San Diego's skyline. It has a height of 381 ft (116 m) and 259 units. Located in the East Village district of downtown San Diego, The Mark is a 33-story building that utilizes the postmodern architectural style and was designed by the architect firms Martinez & Cutri Corp. and Shears Adkins Architects, LLC.

== See also ==
- List of tallest buildings in San Diego
