= Harbor Club Condominiums =

Skyscraper in California, United States

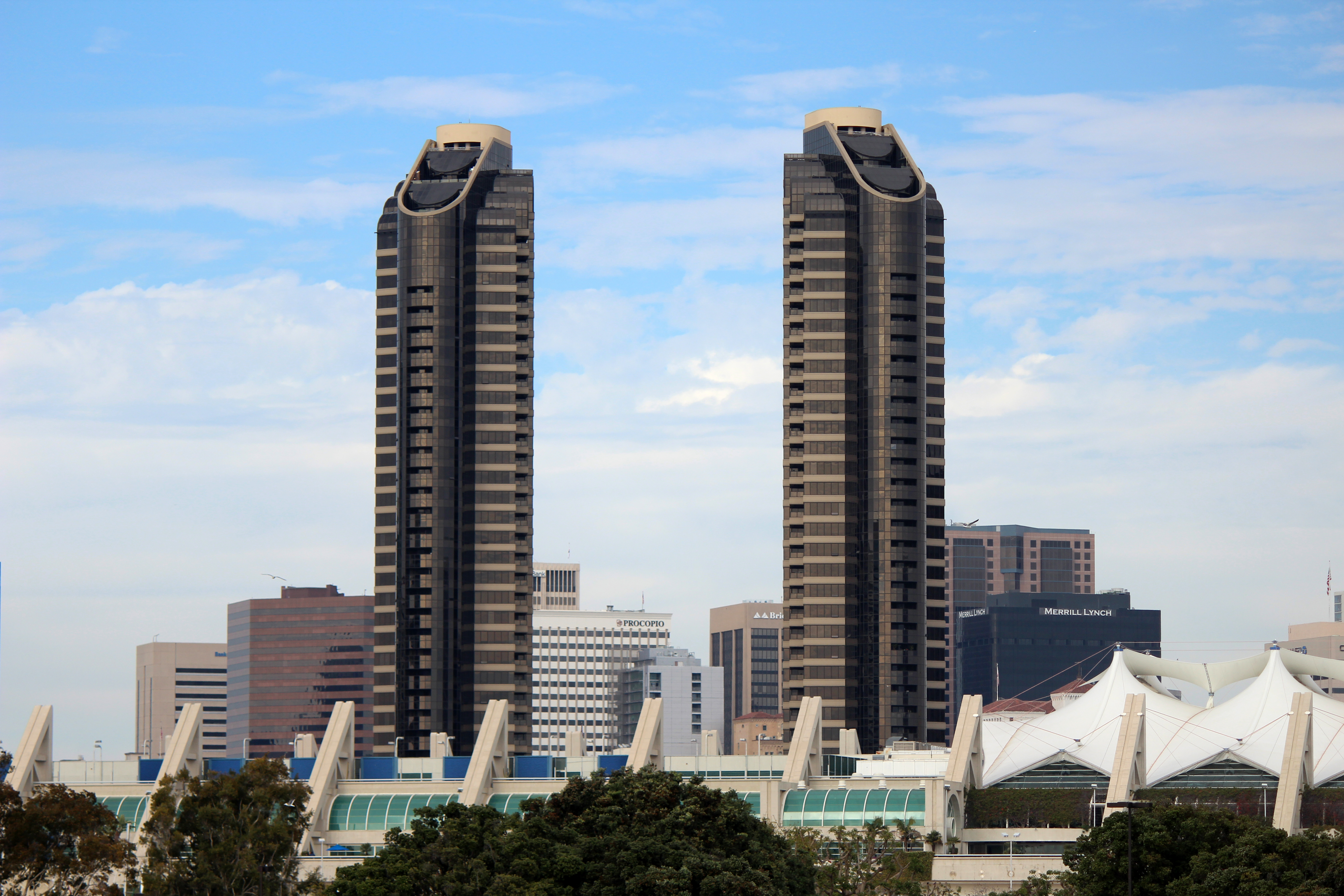
- West and East towers in February 2014
- Interactive map of the Harbor Club Condominiums area

General information
- Type: Residential
- Location: San Diego, California, U.S.
- Coordinates: 32°42′32.11″N 117°9′45.29″W
- Completed: 1992
- Cost: $96 million
- Owner: Leucadia National Corporation

Height
- Antenna spire: None
- Roof: 424 ft (129 m)

Technical details
- Floor count: 41

Design and construction
- Architect: BPA Architecture Planning Interiors

Harbor Club Condominiums is a high-rise residential building in San Diego, California, United States, composed of two towers of equal height. The 41-story towers have a height of 424 feet (129 m) and are a prominent fixture in the city's skyline. Located in the Marina district of downtown San Diego, Harbor Club was designed by architects BPA Architecture Planning Interiors. The condos are located near the San Diego Convention Center and Petco Park. The towers are currently the tenth-tallest buildings in San Diego.

== History ==
Construction of the towers was completed in 1992 at a cost of $96 million.

== See also ==
- List of tallest buildings in San Diego
