= Sapphire Tower (San Diego) =

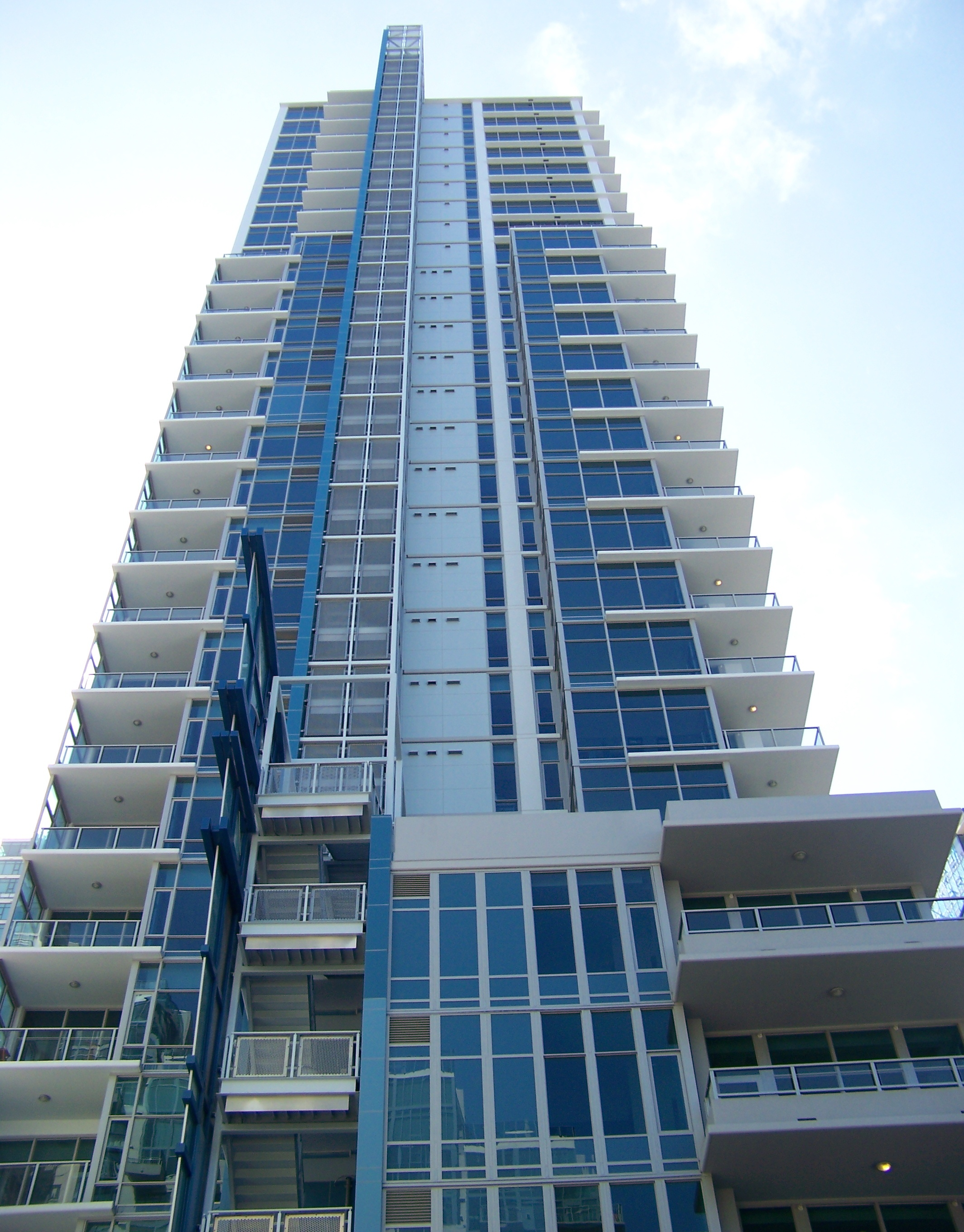
- April 2009
- Interactive map of the Sapphire Tower area

General information
- Type: Residential
- Location: San Diego, California
- Coordinates: 32°43′09.03″N 117°10′09.21″W
- Construction started: 2006
- Completed: 2008
- Cost: $66.6 million

Height
- Antenna spire: None
- Roof: 380 ft (120 m)

Technical details
- Floor count: 32

Design and construction
- Architect: Austin Veum Robbins Parshalle

Sapphire Tower is a building in San Diego, California, and is a prominent fixture in San Diego's skyline. It has a height of 380 ft (116 m) and contains 97 units. Located at the southwest corner of Kettner Boulevard and A Street in the Core district of downtown San Diego, Sapphire Tower is a 32-story building that utilizes the late-modernist architectural style and was designed by the architect firm Austin Veum Robbins Parshalle.

== See also ==
- List of tallest buildings in San Diego
