= 101 W Broadway =

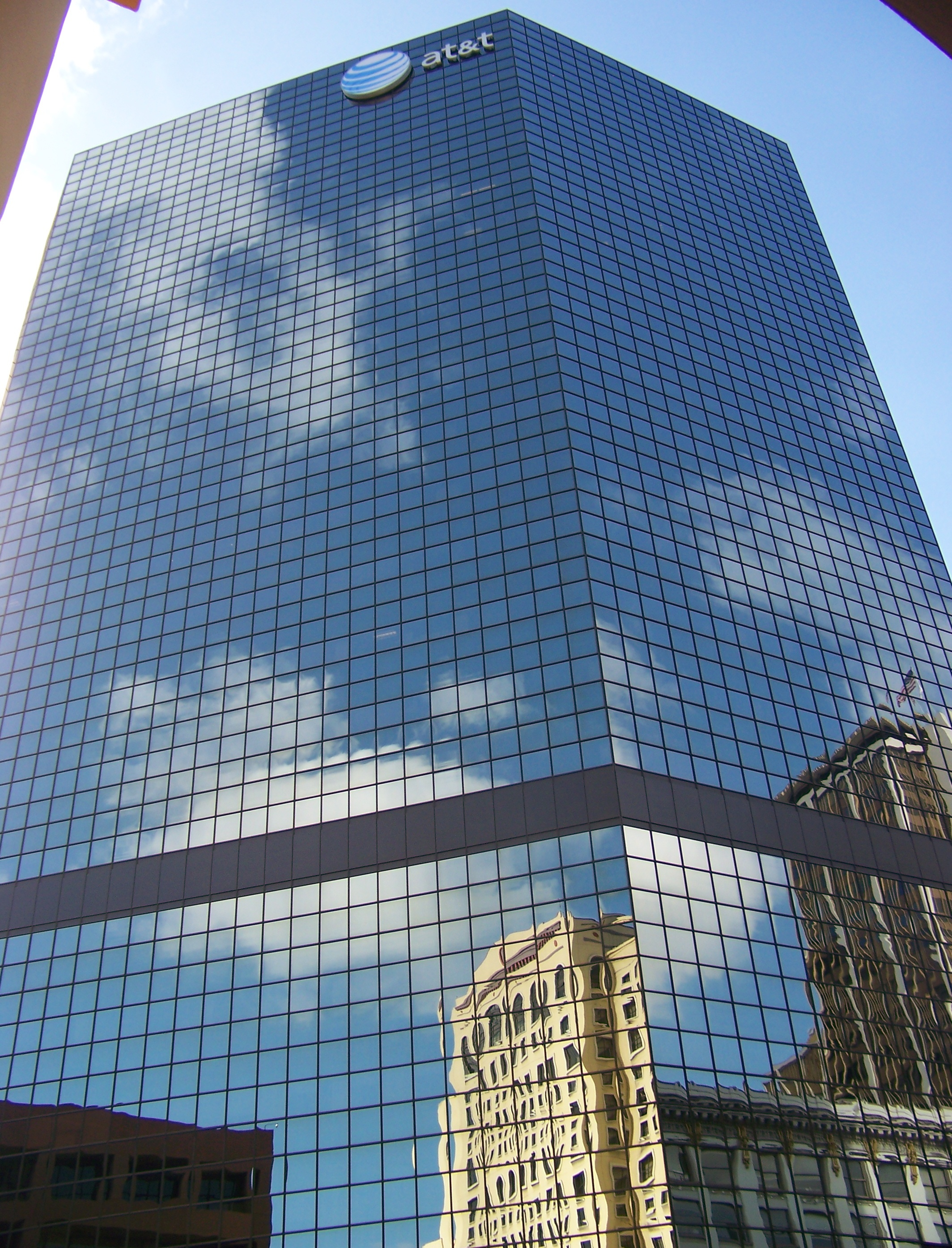
- April 2009

General information
- Type: Office
- Location: San Diego, California
- Coordinates: 32°42′54.09″N 117°9′51.37″W
- Completed: 1982

Height
- Antenna spire: None
- Roof: 348 ft (106 m)

Technical details
- Floor count: 20

Design and construction
- Architect: Langdon Wilson

101 W Broadway is the 24th tallest building in San Diego, California. The 20-story skyscraper has a height of 355 ft (108 m) and is located in the Horton district of downtown San Diego. It was constructed in 1982 and was designed by architect Langdon Wilson.

== History ==
In May 2008, after a pipe bomb exploded in front of the Edward J. Schwartz Federal Courthouse, shrapnel hit the building eight stories up.

== See also ==
- List of tallest buildings in San Diego
