= Electra (San Diego) =

Residential skyscraper in San Diego, California

Coordinates: 32°42′54″N 117°10′11″W

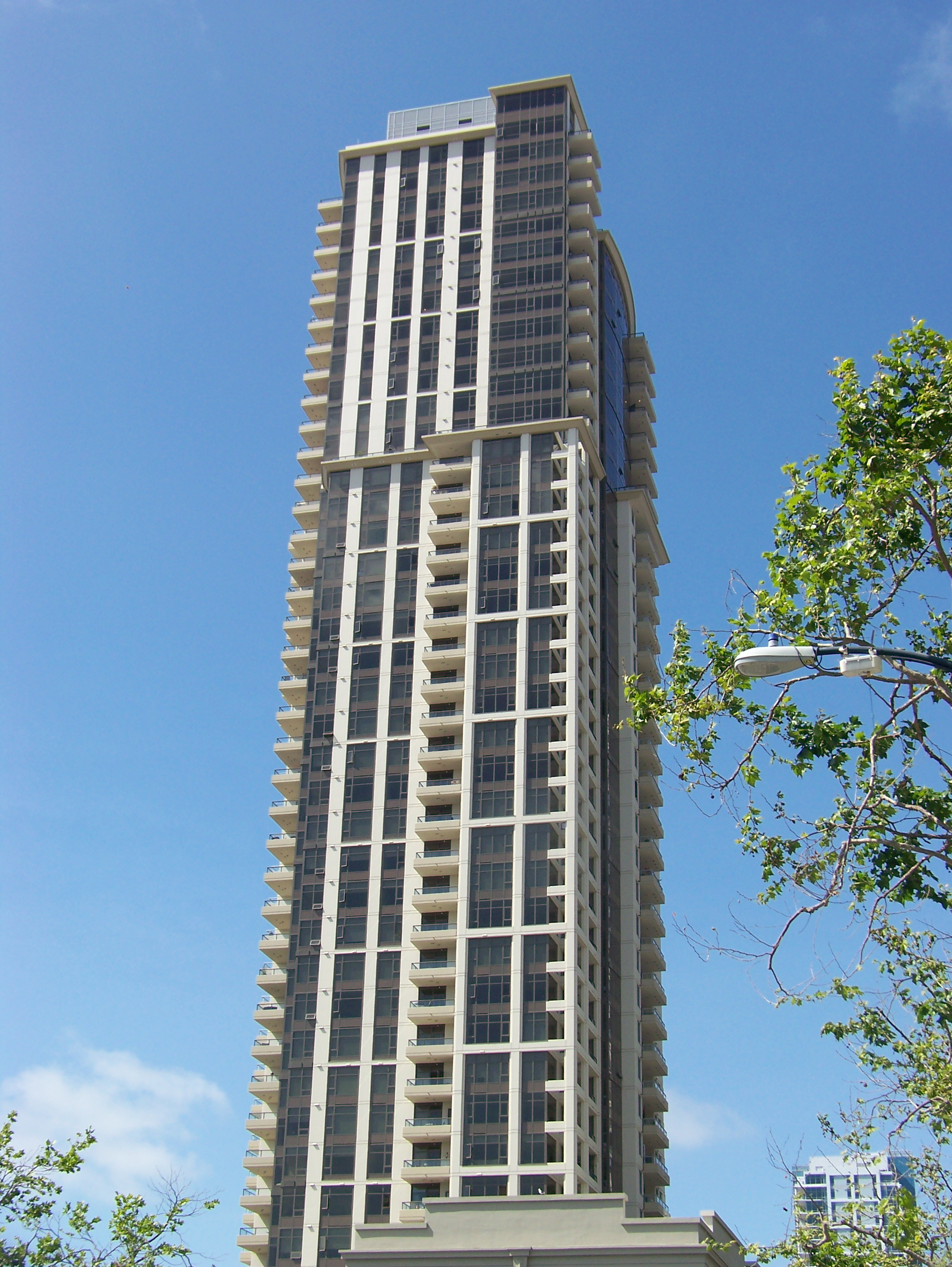
- Electra in April 2009
- Interactive map of the Electra area

General information
- Type: Residential
- Architectural style: Postmodern
- Location: 700 W E St., San Diego, California, United States
- Completed: 2008
- Owner: The Electra Home Owners Association

Technical details
- Structural system: Poured In Place Concrete

Design and construction
- Architect: Chris Dikeakos Architects Inc.
- Main contractor: Bosa Development CA

Electra is a residential skyscraper building in San Diego, California, United States. It is the tallest condominium community and was until 2014 the tallest residential building in San Diego, with a height of 144.8 meters. It comprises 43 floors and 248 rooms, and was completed in 2008. The historic San Diego Gas & Electric Company building is located in the base of the building.

== See also ==
- List of tallest buildings in San Diego
