= Fallbrook Center =

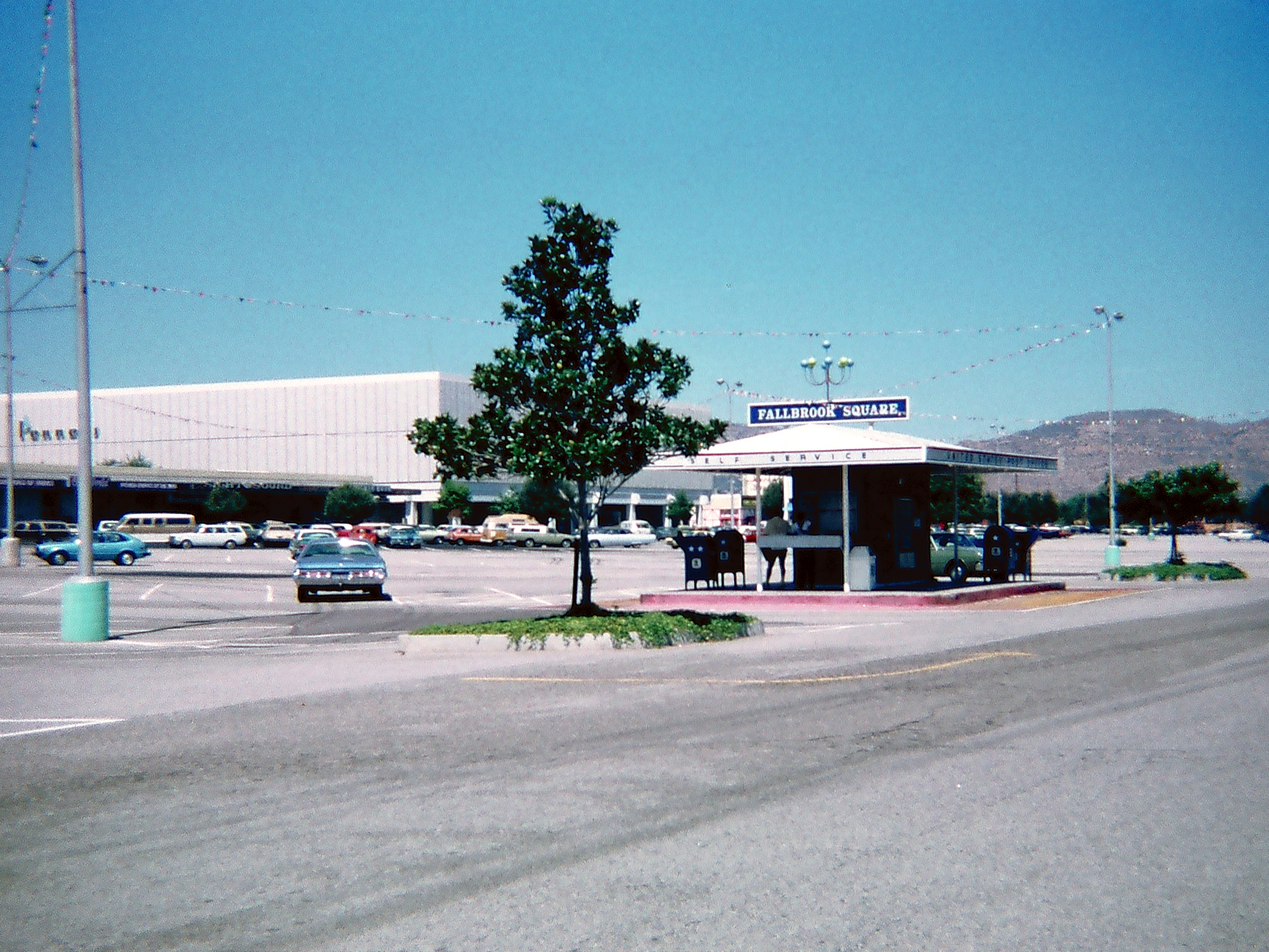
- East parking lot of Fallbrook Square, with a self-service post office in the foreground, 1978
- Location: West Hills, Los Angeles, California, United States
- Coordinates: 34.190169°N 118.625619°W
- Address: 6633 Fallbrook Avenue
- Opened: 12 November 1963
- Developer: Joseph K. Eichenbaum
- Manager: Retail Opportunity Investments Corp.
- Owner: Retail Opportunity Investments Corp.
- Architect: Maxwell Starkman and Associates
- Num. of stores: 42
- Num. of anchor tenants: 6
- Floor area: 880,000 sq ft (82,000 m^{2})
- Floors: 1
- Parking: 5,300
- Website: www.fallbrookcenter.com

Fallbrook Center, originally Fallbrook Square, is a shopping center located on Fallbrook Avenue between Victory Boulevard and Vanowen Street in West Hills, Los Angeles, California.

== History ==
The complex, originally known as Fallbrook Square, opened between November 1963 and November 1966. Housing eighty stores and services in an open-air format, it was anchored by large Sears and JCPenney locations and included F.W. Woolworth, Harris & Frank, Ontra Cafeteria, House of Sight and Sound, Karl's Toys, Nibblers Restaurant, and a Market Basket supermarket.

An enclosing renovation was done between April 1984 and July 1986. Target and Mervyn's anchors were added and the complex was renamed Fallbrook Mall. Damaged by the 1994 Northridge earthquake, and in decline by the late 1990s, the shopping venue was redeveloped between August 2001 and November 2003, emerging as the 1.2-million-square-foot (110,000 m^{2}) Fallbrook Center of today.

The existing Penney's structure, vacated in April 2001, was retenanted by Kohl's. The Sears, which had re-opened at the nearby Westfield Topanga in 1996, was divided between Big Kmart (upper level) and Burlington Coat Factory (lower level); these opened in 1997. The Big Kmart closed in 2002 and reopened as a Walmart in January 2004.

Mervyn's closed in 2008. Sprouts Farmers Market and Ulta Beauty replaced the former Mervyn's in the form of a shared space in 2013. However, Ulta Beauty closed its Fallbrook Center location and moved to a new space in Canoga Park in 2021. Kohl's closed in June 2016 as a part of closing 18 stores nationwide.

The Fallbrook Square sign and marquee can be seen in the 1974 drag racing documentary "Funny Car Summer" when a bicycle drag race event was held there.

Fallbrook Center was used as the exterior location of the "Burbank Buymore" on Warner Brothers and NBC's Chuck.
