= Maxwell Starkman =

Canadian architect

- Born: November 17, 1921; Toronto, Ontario, Canada
- Died: December 29, 2003 (aged 82); Los Angeles, California, U.S.
- Education: University of Manitoba
- Occupation: Architect
- Practice: Maxwell Starkman Associates
- Buildings: Museum of Tolerance

Maxwell Starkman (November 17, 1921 – December 29, 2003) was a Canadian architect based in Los Angeles, California.

== Biography ==
=== Early life ===
Maxwell Starkman was born in 1921 in Toronto, Canada. He served in England, France, Belgium and Germany during World War II. He graduated from the University of Manitoba.

=== Career ===
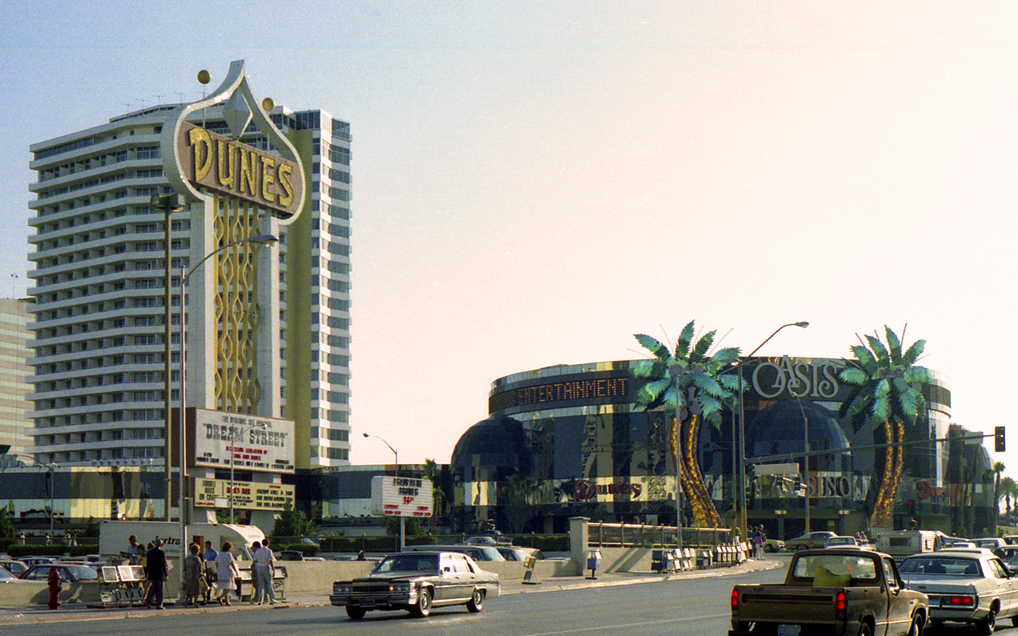
The Dunes hotel and casino in Las Vegas, Nevada.

He moved to Los Angeles, California in 1950. Shortly after, he started working for Richard J. Neutra. In 1953, he started Reichl and Starkman Architects with fellow architect Fritz Reichl. After Reichl died in 1954, he established Maxwell Starkman Associates, an architectural firm. He mostly built tract homes for returning G.I.s.

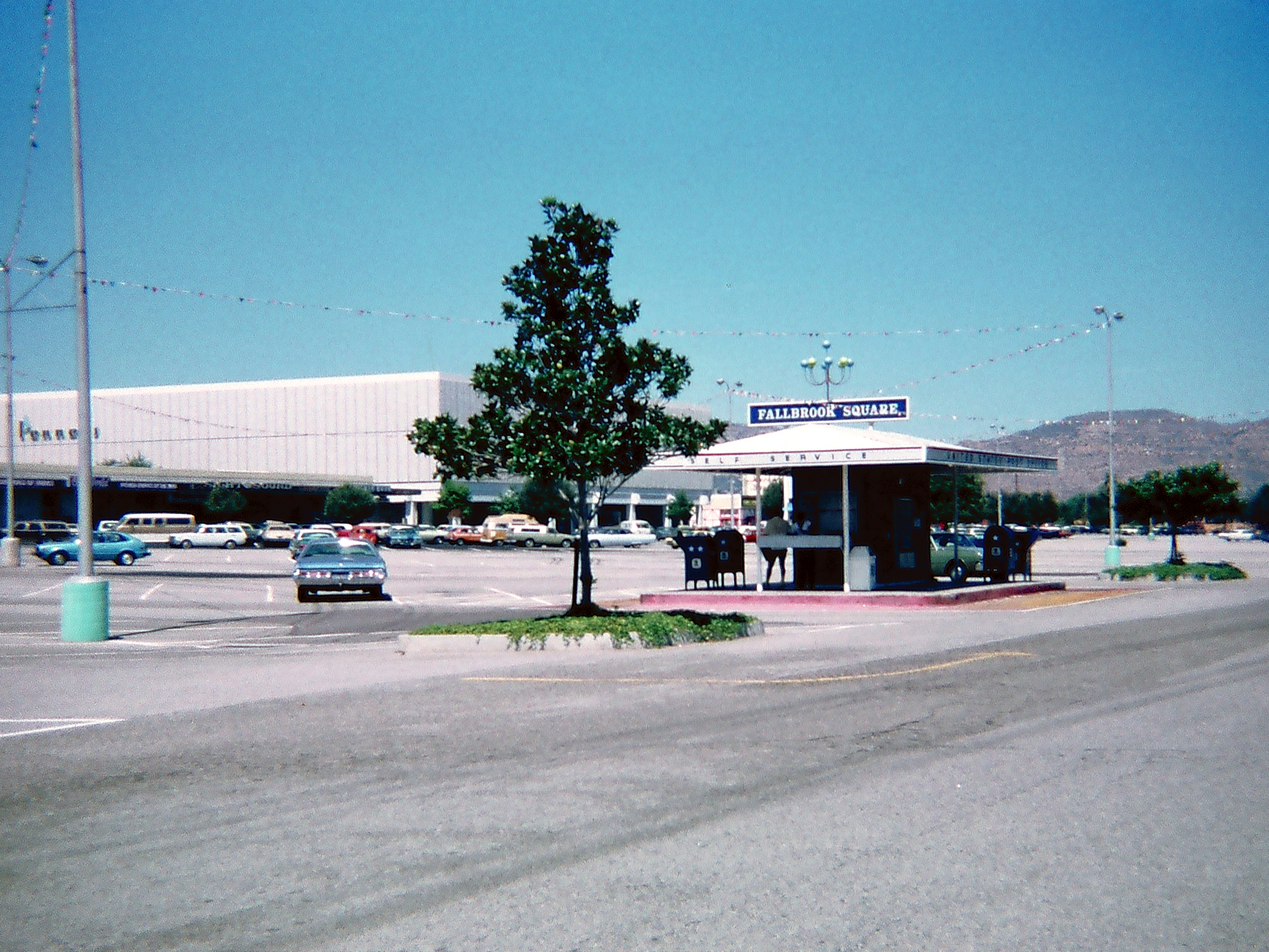
The Fallbrook Center in West Hills, Los Angeles, California.

Later, he built commercial buildings such as shopping malls and drugstores. For example, he designed the Park Place Shopping Center and the Sunrise City Shopping Center along the Maryland Parkway in Las Vegas, Nevada. He also designed the Fallbrook Center in West Hills and some student housing at California State University, Los Angeles. Later in the 1960s, he designed the Melodyland Theater in Anaheim. Additionally, Starkman designed the Dunes hotel and casino, which was later demolished and replaced with the Bellagio.

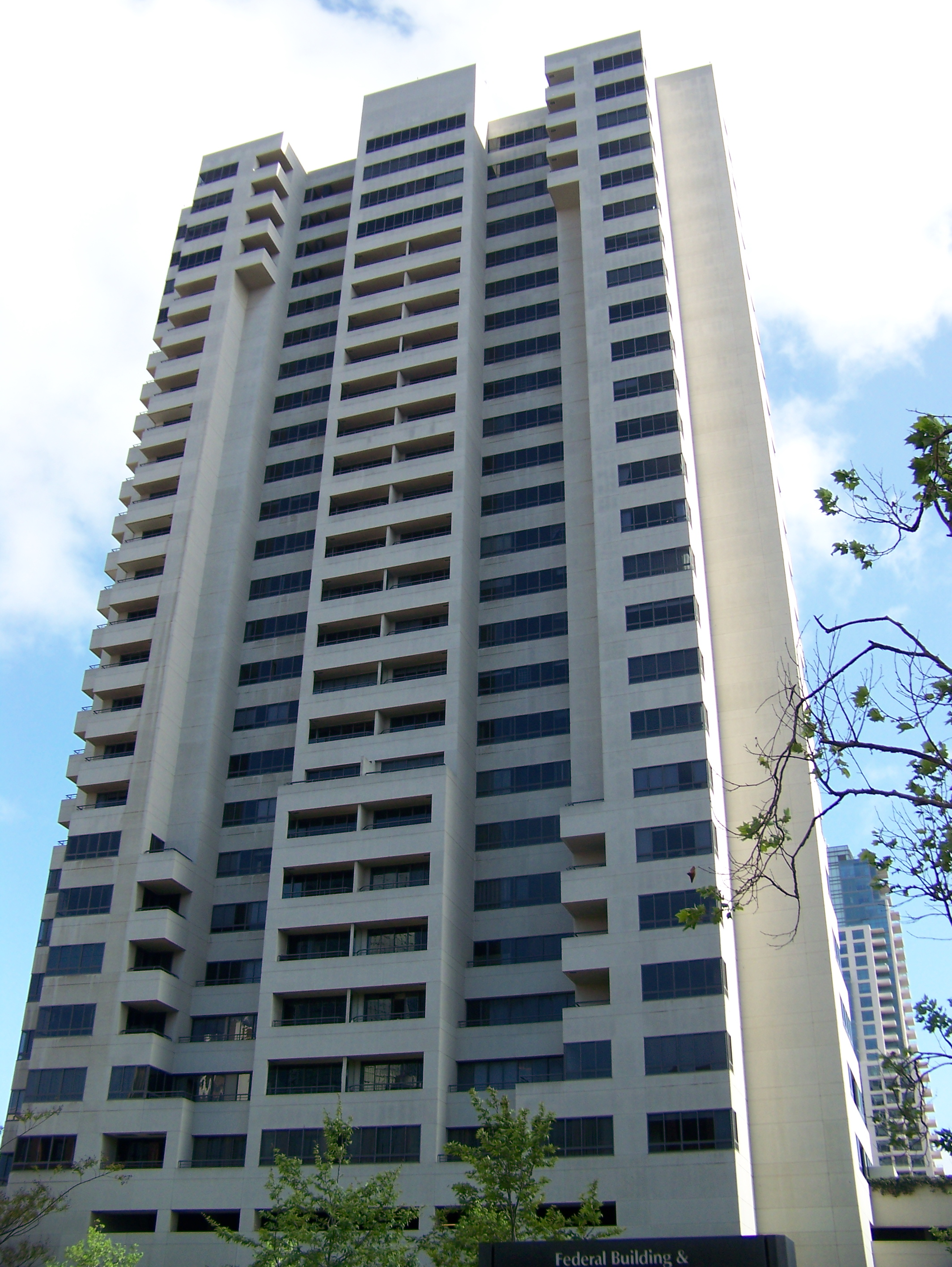
The Meridian Condominiums in San Diego, California.

In 1972, he designed the Zenith Tower located at 6300 on Wilshire Boulevard, near Carthay Circle. It was built for the Zenith National Insurance as a sixteen-story skyscraper. Later, he designed the Sony Pictures Plaza. He also designed the Meridian Condominiums, a skyscraper in San Diego. His last design was the Museum of Tolerance.

He retired in 1987.

=== Personal life ===
He was married to Gloria Starkman. They had three sons and one daughter: sons David, Laurence, Robert, and Nancy. He became a widower when his wife died in 1992.

=== Death ===
He died on December 29, 2003.

== Legacy ==
The Maxwell Starkman Scholarship in Architecture at the University of Manitoba is named in his honor.
