= Imperial Bank Tower =

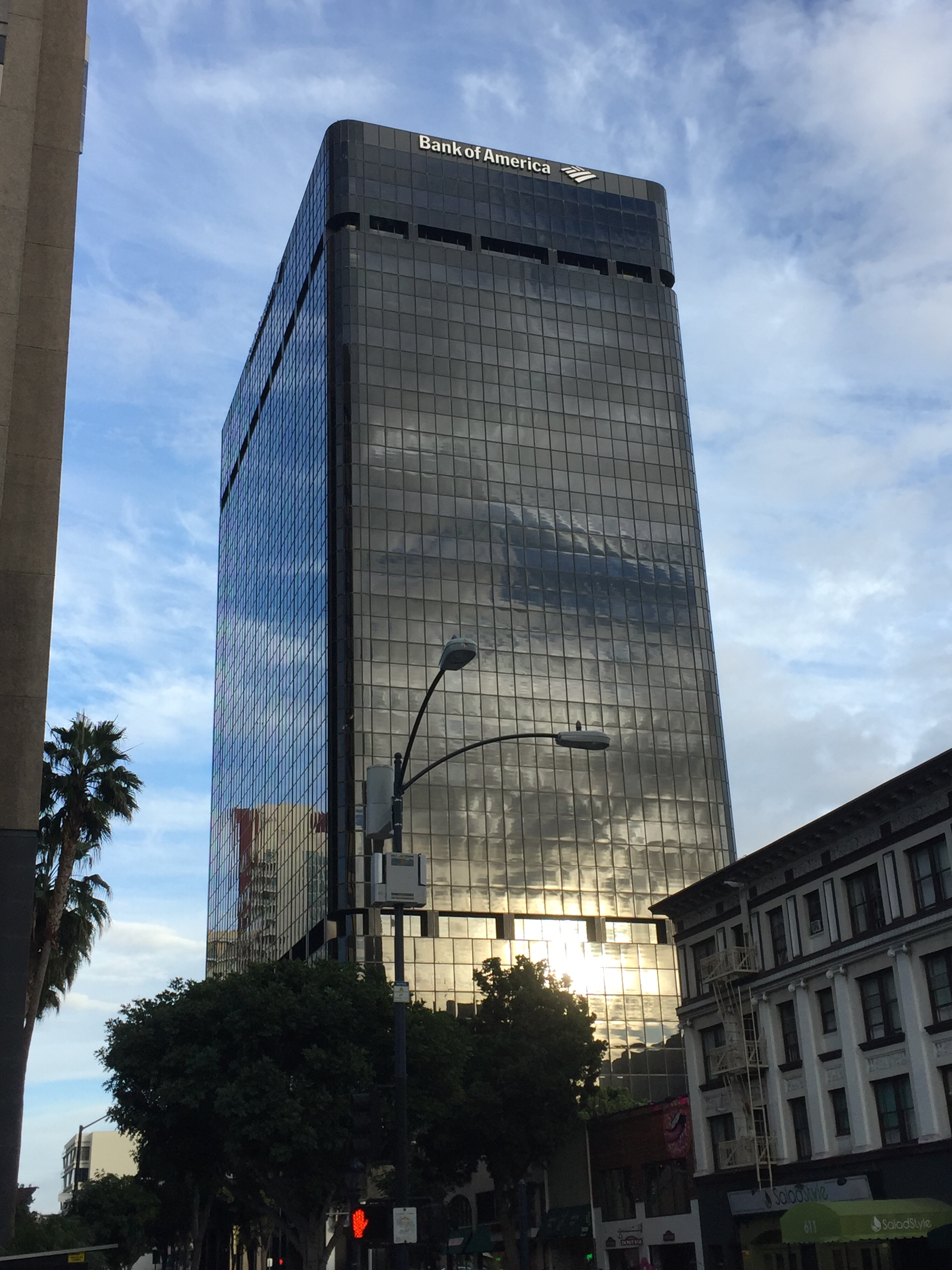
- February 2018
- Interactive map of the Imperial Bank Tower area

General information
- Type: Office
- Location: San Diego, California
- Coordinates: 32°43′3″N 117°9′28″W
- Completed: 1982

Height
- Antenna spire: None
- Roof: 355 ft (108 m)

Technical details
- Floor count: 24

Design and construction
- Architects: Ware and Malcomb

Imperial Bank Tower, also known as 701B, is the 25th tallest building in San Diego, California, and is a prominent fixture in San Diego's skyline. The 24-story skyscraper has a height of 355 ft (108 m) and is located in the Core district of downtown San Diego. It was constructed in 1982.

== See also ==
- List of tallest buildings in San Diego
