= Wereldhave =

Wereldhave N.V.
- Type: Naamloze vennootschap
- Traded as: Euronext: WHA
- Industry: Property
- Founded: 1930
- Headquarters: Schiphol, Netherlands
- Key people: Matthijs Storm (CEO), Dennis de Vreede (CFO), Ruud van Maanen (Director IR & Corporate Development)
- Products: Commercial property
- Operating income: €133.8 million (2010)
- Net income: €88.7 million (2010)
- Total assets: €3.122 billion (end 2010)
- Total equity: €1.728 billion (end 2010)
- Number of employees: 184 (2017, in fte)
- Website: www.wereldhave.com

Wereldhave N.V. is a Dutch real estate investment company founded in 1930, headquartered in the World Trade Center at Amsterdam Airport Schiphol. The company focuses on investments in commercial property. In 2010 the firm recorded a profit of €89 million, against a market capitalisation of around €1.6 billion. Real estate properties are located predominantly in the Netherlands, Finland, United Kingdom, United States, Belgium, France, and Spain. Wereldhave is listed at Euronext Amsterdam and forms part of the AMX index.
