= Vantage Pointe Condominium =

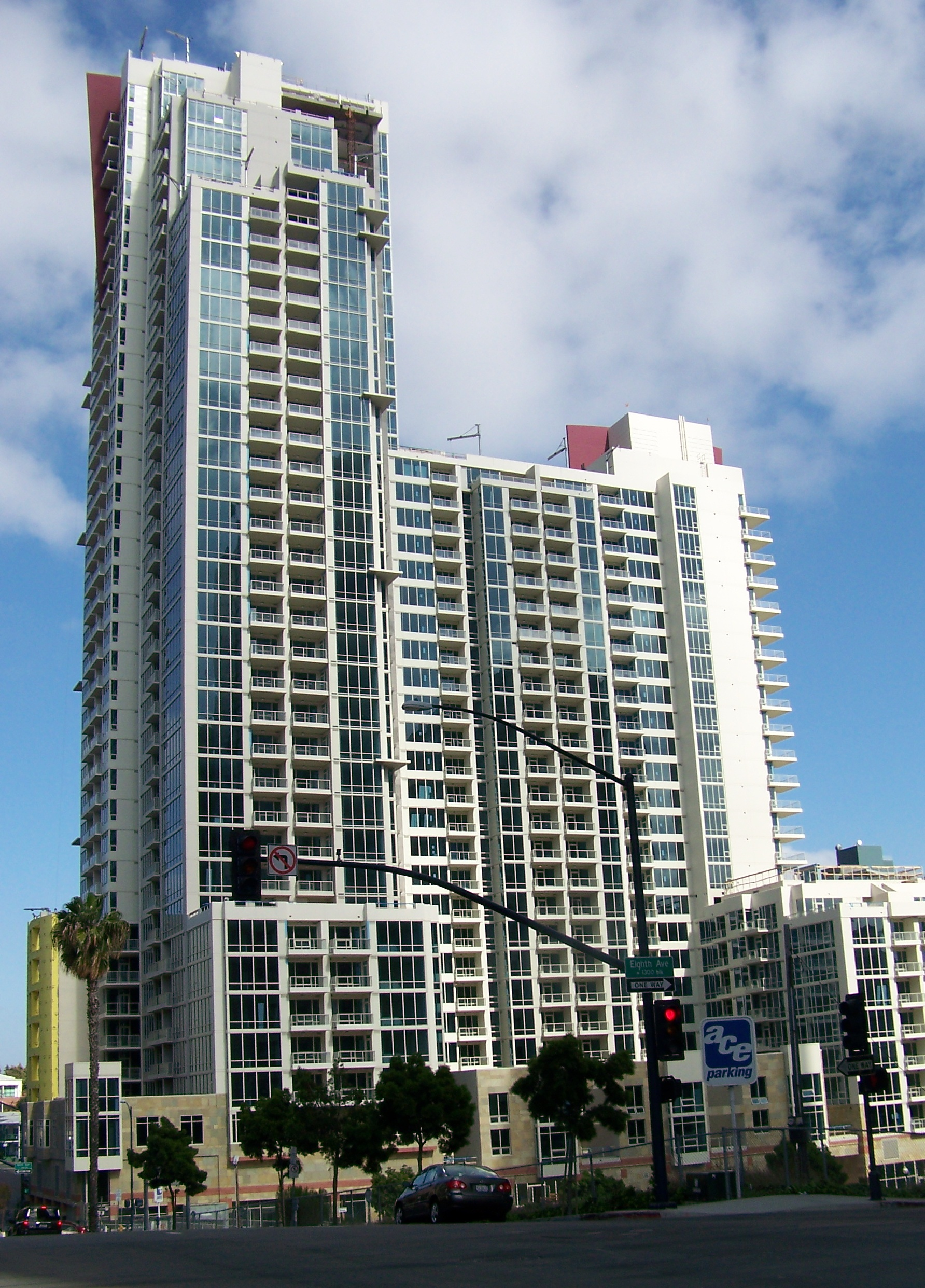

General information
- Status: Completed
- Type: Residential
- Location: San Diego, California
- Coordinates: 32°43′05.61″N 117°09′21.60″W

Height
- Antenna spire: None
- Top floor: 420 ft (130 m)

Technical details
- Floor count: 41

Design and construction
- Architect: S2 Architecture

Vantage Pointe Condominium is a high-rise 40 story building in San Diego, California. Construction began in 2006 and ended in 2008. It is one of downtown San Diego's largest apartment buildings, surpassed only by the Pinnacle West Tower by about 60 feet. In 2009, the building's owners announced they will refund all the purchase deposits made for its units.

Architect critics have criticized the building's lack of "human-scale relationship at street level," thus earning it the "Grand Onion" award by the San Diego Architectural Foundation.

After many years of being managed by Equity Residential now Vivmark Residential the building was sold to Brookfield Properties, now BGRE but was recently turned over to LyvWell management, apparently an arm of Brookfield. Residents report chronic negative maintenance issues revolving around water outages, HVAC outages, and elevators in a chronic state of disrepair, as well as lack of management responsiveness to ongoing issues such as lease violations by other residents (e.g., smoking, noise, pet, trash, speeding in the parking garage). Several catastrophic failures have occurred, including water main breakages that have flooded elevator shafts and destroyed the lobby ceiling, both needing major, long-term repairs. Some elevator outages left residents above the 26th floor needing to climb stairs to access their apartments on floors 27-40.

Making matters worse is the fact the management at this property is reticent about significant issues affecting the whole community.

On July 13, 2026, the class action lawsuit regarding Vantage Pointe Apartments in San Diego, Fogy v. BPREP Vantage Pointe LLC et al. (Case No. 25-CV-622 TWR (VET)) in the U.S. District Court for the Southern District of California was decided in favor of the plaintiff. The case was brought because of all the major chronic maintenance problems at this property, which adversely affected quality of life here. Payouts to class members have begun.

== See also ==
- List of tallest buildings in San Diego
