= Tower 180 =

Skyscraper in San Diego, California

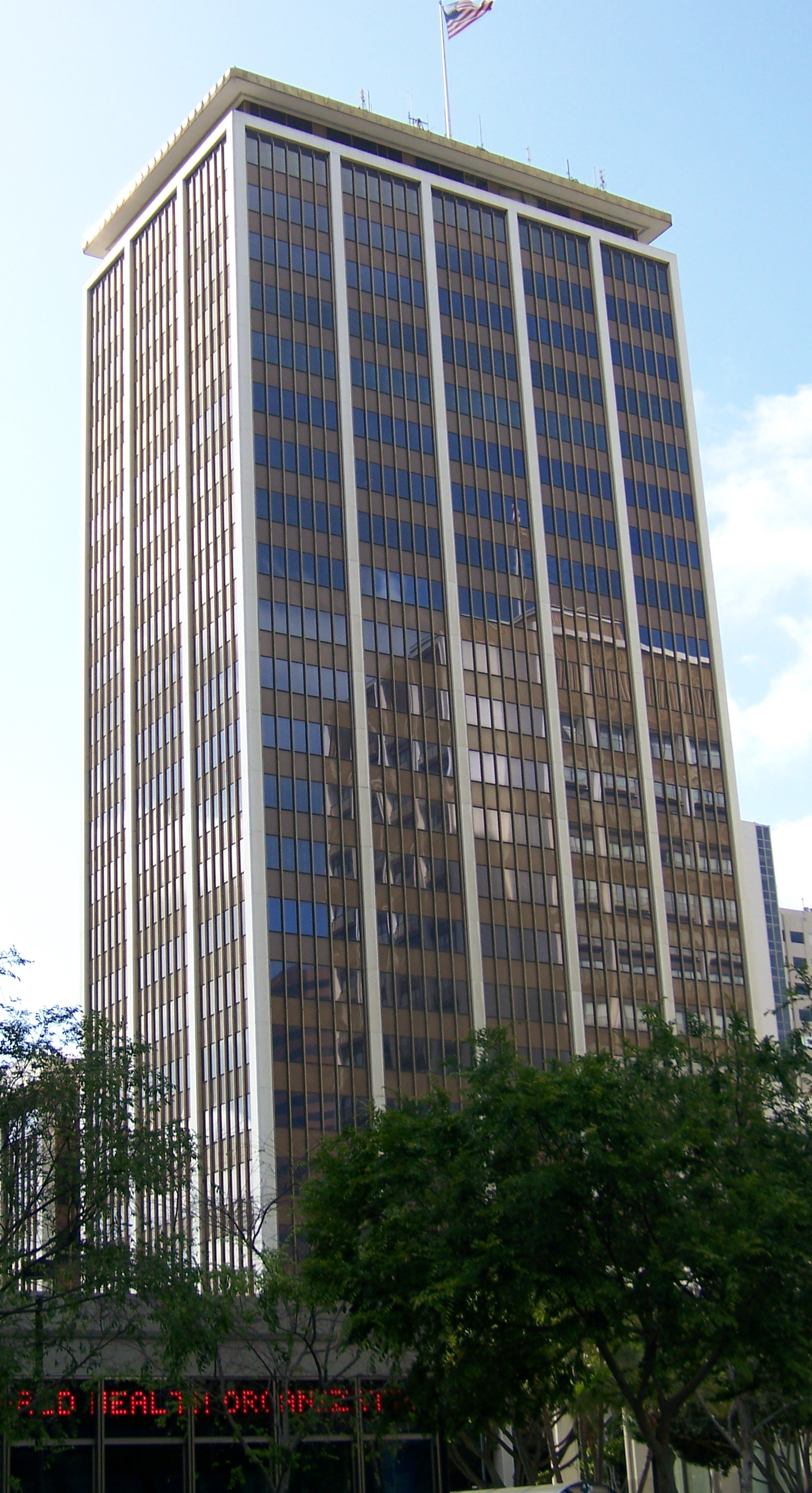
- Tower 180 before renovations in 2009
- Interactive map of the Tower 180 area
- Alternative names: United States National Bank Building; Wickes Building

General information
- Type: Commercial offices
- Location: 1010 Second Avenue; San Diego, California, US
- Coordinates: 32.7160°N 117.1631°W
- Completed: 1963

Height
- Antenna spire: 121 m (397 ft)
- Roof: 106.68 m (350.0 ft)

Technical details
- Floor count: 25
- Floor area: 346,343 sq ft (32,176.3 m^{2})

Design and construction
- Architect: Raymond Harry Ervin

Tower 180, formerly the Executive Complex, is a 25-story building located at 180 Broadway in San Diego, California, United States. Upon completion in 1963, the 106.68 m (350.0 ft) building was the tallest in the city until 1969.

== History ==
The building at 180 Broadway in Downtown San Diego was completed in 1963 as the United States National Bank Building, serving as a major financial office tower in the city’s central business district. An additional eight-story annex was constructed in 1973, expanding the complex and increasing office capacity. The tower remained in continuous use as office space for several decades. In 2014, the building underwent a significant renovation that updated the lobby, elevators, and façade, aiming to modernize the aging structure and retain tenants in a competitive downtown market.

By the early 2020s, however, the office market in downtown San Diego faced high vacancy rates, and Tower 180 gradually lost tenants. In 2023, it was purchased by developer J Street Space, which announced plans to convert the 25-story tower into a dual-branded Hyatt hotel combining Hyatt Place and Hyatt House brands. The adaptive-reuse project includes several hundred guest rooms, meeting space, and ground-floor retail, representing a significant shift from office to hospitality use in downtown San Diego. The project is currently under review and construction is expected to begin early 2026.
