= Pinnacle Marina Tower =

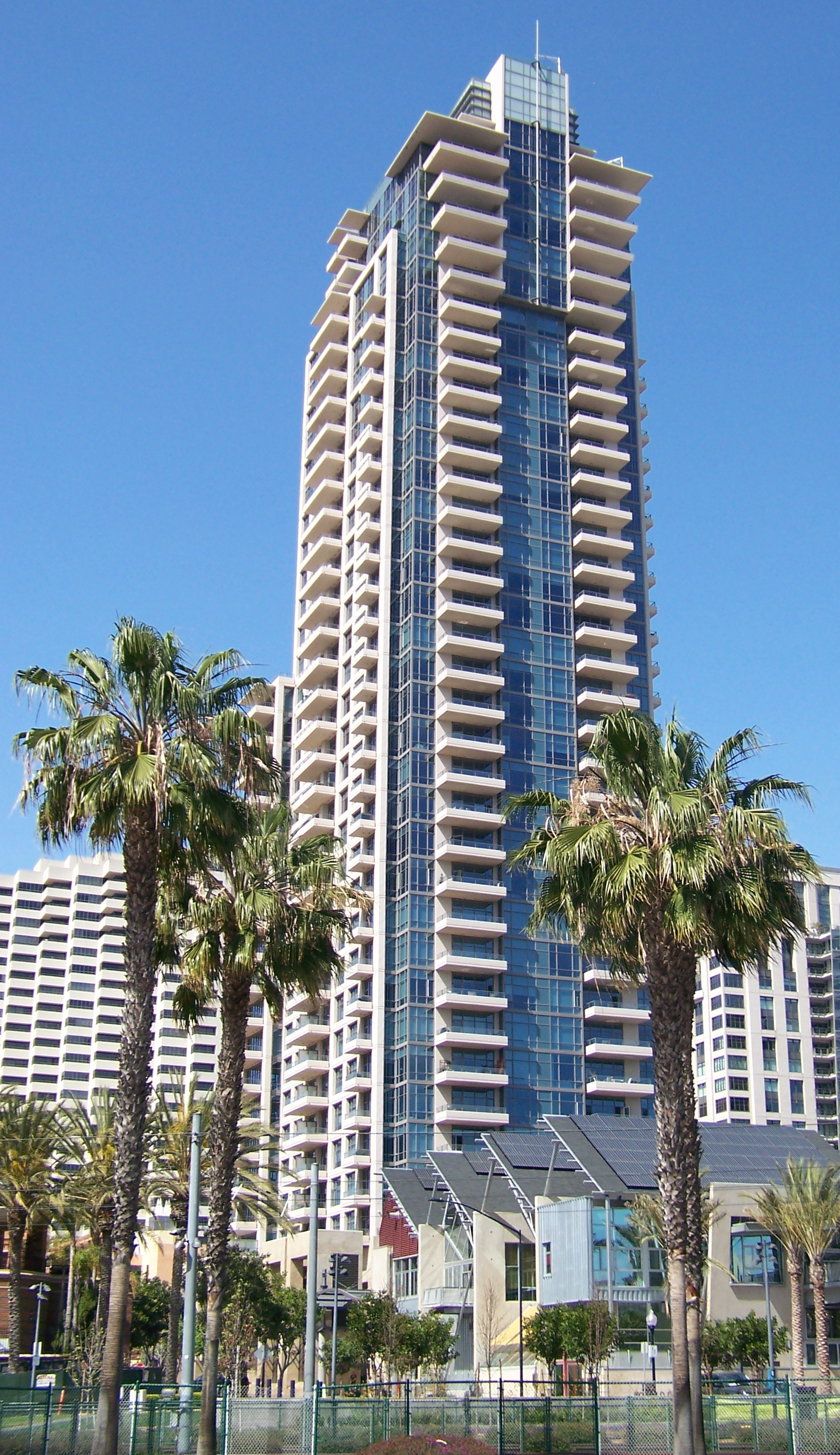
- Interactive map of the Pinnacle Marina Tower area
- Former names: Pinnacle Museum Tower

General information
- Type: Residential condominium
- Architectural style: Postmodernism
- Location: 550 Front Street; San Diego, California, United States
- Coordinates: 32.7101°N 117.1650°W
- Construction started: 2003
- Completed: 2005
- Cost: $150 million
- Operator: The Prescott Companies

Height
- Roof: 137.2 m (450 ft)

Technical details
- Floor count: 36
- Lifts/elevators: 5

Design and construction
- Architects: Austin Veum Robbins Parshalle; Hancock Brückner Eng + Wright
- Structural engineer: Glotman Simpson Group
- Main contractor: Pinnacle International Development, Inc.

Pinnacle Marina Tower is a high rise building in San Diego, California, United States. It was completed in 2005 as the Pinnacle Museum Tower, and is the second tallest residential building in the city with a height of 449 feet (137 m). The building has 36 floors, a three-floor parking garage, 182 residential units and nine commercial units. It is situated in the Marina district of downtown San Diego.

== See also ==
- San Diego's tallest buildings
