= List of tallest buildings in California =

This list ranks skyscrapers/high rise buildings and structures in the US State of California by height. Buildings and structures in seven cities are included in this list; Los Angeles, San Francisco, San Diego, Long Beach, Sacramento, Burbank and Oakland each have buildings taller than 400 feet (120 m).

The tallest building is the Wilshire Grand Center at 1,100 feet (340 m). All of the buildings and structures taller than 500 feet (150 m) are in Los Angeles and San Francisco. The tallest building in San Diego rises exactly 500 feet due to restrictions imposed by the Federal Aviation Administration (FAA) in the 1970s, because of the downtown's proximity to San Diego International Airport.

== Buildings over 500 feet ==
Was the tallest building in California upon completion
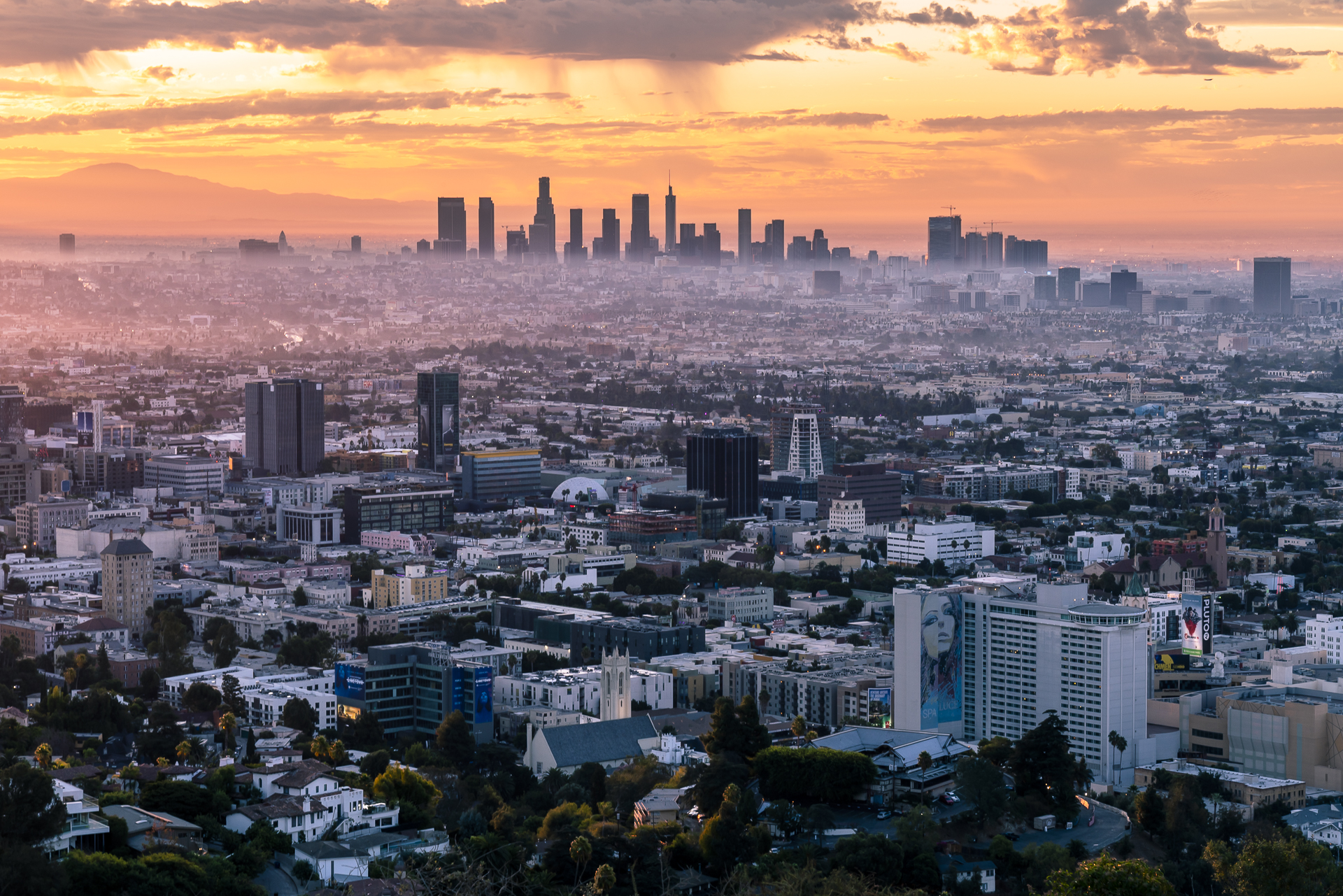
Los Angeles Skyline in 2019

Rank	Name	Image	Height ft / (m)	Floors	Year	City	Rank in its city	Notes
1	Wilshire Grand Center		1,100 (340)	73	2017	Los Angeles	1	Topped-out in 2016, and officially opened in June 2017. The tower is the tallest building in Los Angeles and the West Coast of the United States as measured by structural height, which includes a 295-foot spire. When measured by roof height, the tower is 934 ft. tall, which is 84 ft. shorter than the US Bank Tower roof.
2	Salesforce Tower		1,070 (330)	61	2018	San Francisco	1	124th-tallest building in the world, 17th-tallest building in the United States, 2nd-tallest building on the West Coast, tallest building in San Francisco since 2018.
3	U.S. Bank Tower		1,018 (310)	73	1989	Los Angeles	2	161st-tallest building in the world, 23rd-tallest building in the United States, tallest building on the West Coast of the United States when measured by roof height. Only building in California whose roof height exceeds 1,000 ft. Tallest structure in a major active seismic region from 1989 to 2010; Taipei 101 now holds this title. Tallest building constructed in Los Angeles in the 1980s. Formerly known as Library Tower.
N/A	Sutro Tower		977 (298)		1973	San Francisco	N/A	Tallest non-building radio tower in San Francisco since 1973. Because it sits atop a hill, the tower actually reaches a height of 1,814 ft (553 m) above sea level.
N/A	KCBS Tower		972 (296)		1986	Mount Wilson	N/A	2nd tallest non-building radio tower in California. Because it sits atop a mountain, the tower actually reaches a height of 6,631 ft (2,021 m) above sea level.
4	Aon Center		858 (262)	62	1973	Los Angeles	3	60th-tallest building in the United States. Tallest building constructed in Los Angeles in the 1970s.
5	Transamerica Pyramid		853 (260)	48	1972	San Francisco	2	Tallest building in San Francisco from 1972-2017; 61st-tallest in the United States, and 473rd-tallest in the world; tallest building on the West Coast from 1972 until 1974; tallest building constructed in San Francisco in the 1970s
6	181 Fremont		803 (245)	56	2017	San Francisco	3	San Francisco headquarters of Facebook and Instagram.
7	555 California Street		779 (237)	52	1969	San Francisco	4	Tallest building on the West Coast from 1969 to 1972; formerly known as Bank of America Center; tallest building constructed in the city in the 1960s
8	Two California Plaza		750 (230)	54	1992	Los Angeles	4	121st-tallest building in the United States (tied). Tallest building constructed in Los Angeles in the 1990s.
9	Gas Company Tower		749 (228)	52	1991	Los Angeles	5	127th-tallest building in the United States.
10	Bank of America Center		735 (224)	55	1974	Los Angeles	6	144th-tallest building in the United States (tied). Originally known as Security Pacific Bank Plaza, then as ARCO Plaza, then BP Plaza.
11	777 Tower		725 (221)	52	1991	Los Angeles	7	
12	Wells Fargo North Tower		723 (220)	54	1983	Los Angeles	8	
13	Figueroa at Wilshire		717 (219)	53	1990	Los Angeles	9	Formerly known as the Sanwa Bank Building.
14=	City National Tower		699 (213)	52	1972	Los Angeles	10 =	This building and Paul Hastings Tower stand as the tallest twin towers in Los Angeles. Formerly known as the Bank of America Tower.
14=	Paul Hastings Tower		699 (213)	52	1972	Los Angeles	10 =	This building and City National Tower stand as the tallest twin towers in Los Angeles. Formerly known as ARCO Tower.
16 =	The Beaudry		695 (212)	52	2023	Los Angeles	12	Tallest all residential building in California.
16 =	345 California Center		695 (212)	48	1986	San Francisco	5	Tallest mid-block skyscraper in San Francisco; tallest building constructed in the city in the 1980s
18	Oceanwide Plaza Tower 1		677 (206)	49	2020	Los Angeles	13	Topped out, interior unfinished.
19	LA Live Hotels & Condominiums		667 (203)	54	2010	Los Angeles	14	
20	Metropolis Tower D		647 (197)	58	2019	Los Angeles	15	
21	Millennium Tower		645 (197)	58	2009	San Francisco	6	Tallest building constructed in the city in the 2000s
22	One Rincon Hill South Tower		641 (195)	60	2008	San Francisco	7	Tallest all-residential building in the city
23	820 Olive		636 (194)	49	2019	Los Angeles	16	Alternatively called 825 Hill. Construction started in 2016 and completed in 2019.
24	Citigroup Center		625 (191)	48	1979	Los Angeles	17	Formerly known as the 444 Flower Building.
25	611 Place		620 (190)	42	1967	Los Angeles	18	Tallest building constructed in Los Angeles in the 1960s.
26	The Avery		618 (188)	66	2019	San Francisco	8	
27	Wells Fargo South Tower		606 (185)	42	1984	Los Angeles	19	
28	Park Tower at Transbay		605 (184)	43	2018	San Francisco	9	
29 =	Century Plaza Hotel Residential Tower North		600 (180)	46	2021	Los Angeles	20 =	This building and the identical south tower stand as the tallest buildings in California outside the CBDs of Los Angeles and San Francisco.
29 =	Century Plaza Hotel Residential Tower South		600 (180)	46	2021	Los Angeles	20 =	
29 =	Salesforce West		600 (180)	43	1985	San Francisco	10=	
29 =	101 California Street		600 (180)	48	1982	San Francisco	10=	
33	One California Plaza		578 (176)	42	1985	Los Angeles	22	
34	Market Center		573 (175)	40	1975	San Francisco	12	
35=	Century Plaza Tower I		571 (174)	44	1975	Los Angeles	23 =	Designed by Minoru Yamasaki. The towers resemble Yamasaki's iconic work, the original World Trade Center in New York City, with their twin configuration, vertical black and gray lines, and aluminum exteriors.
35=	Century Plaza Tower II		571 (174)	44	1975	Los Angeles	23 =	
37	Four Embarcadero Center		570 (170)	45	1982	San Francisco	13	
38	One Embarcadero Center		569 (173)	45	1971	San Francisco	14	
39	44 Montgomery Street		565 (172)	43	1967	San Francisco	15	
40	Spear Tower		564 (172)	43	1976	San Francisco	16	
41	KPMG Tower		560 (170)	45	1983	Los Angeles	25	
42	One Sansome Street		550 (170)	39	1984	San Francisco	17	
43	One Rincon Hill North Tower		541 (165)	49	2014	San Francisco	18	
44	One Front Street		538 (164)	38	1979	San Francisco	19	
45	Ernst & Young Plaza		534 (163)	41	1985	Los Angeles	26	
46	SunAmerica Center		533 (162)	39	1990	Los Angeles	27	
47 =	Oceanwide Plaza Tower II		530 (160)	40	2020	Los Angeles	28 =	Topped off, interior left unfinished.
47 =	Oceanwide Plaza Tower III		530 (160)	40	2020	Los Angeles	28 =	Topped off, interior left unfinished.
49 =	First Market Tower		529 (161)	39	1973	San Francisco	20=	
49 =	McKesson Plaza		529 (161)	38	1969	San Francisco	20=	
49 =	Hope+Flower Tower 1		529 (161)	40	2019	Los Angeles	30 =	
49 =	Fig+Pico Tower 1		529 (161)	42	2023	Los Angeles	30=	
53	425 Market Street		525 (160)	38	1973	San Francisco	22	
54	The Grand By Gehry		522 (159)	39	2022	Los Angeles	32	Designed by Frank Gehry.
55	TCW Tower		517 (158)	39	1990	Los Angeles	33	
56	Union Bank Plaza		516 (157)	40	1968	Los Angeles	34	
57	Four Seasons Private Residences at 706 Mission Street		510 (160)	43	2020	San Francisco	23	
58	10 Universal City Plaza		506 (154)	36	1984	Los Angeles	35	Tallest building in the San Fernando Valley.

== Buildings from 400 to 500 feet ==
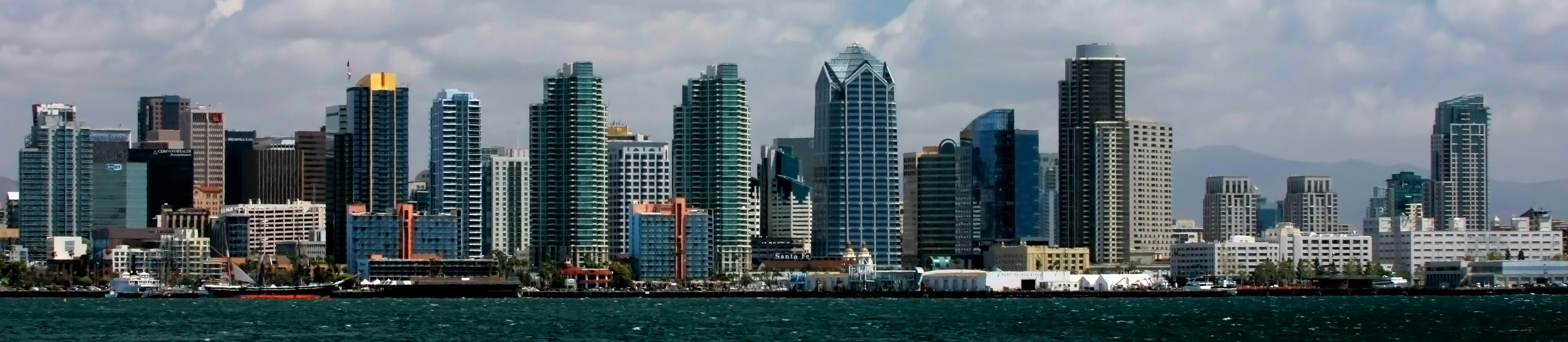
San Diego skyline in April 2009

Rank	Name	Image	Height ft (m)	Floors	Year	City	Notes
59=	One America Plaza		500 (152)	34	1991	San Diego	Tallest building in San Diego; tallest building in California outside of Los Angeles and San Francisco; tallest building constructed in the 1990s
59=	Telesis Tower		500 (152)	38	1982	San Francisco	
61	Symphony Towers		499 (152)	34	1989	San Diego	
62	Manchester Grand Hyatt Hotel		497 (151)	40	1992	San Diego	Tallest building on the waterfront on the West Coast
63	1100 Wilshire		496 (151)	35	1987	Los Angeles	Known for its large above ground parking garage.
64	333 Bush Street		495 (151)	43	1986	San Francisco	
65=	Hilton San Francisco Tower I		493 (150)	46	1971	San Francisco	Tallest building used exclusively as a hotel in the city
65=	Fox Plaza		493 (150)	34	1987	Los Angeles	Known as Nakatomi Plaza from the 1988 Die Hard film.
67	Pacific Gas & Electric Building		492 (150)	34	1971	San Francisco	
68	MGM Tower/Constellation Place		491 (150)	35	2003	Los Angeles	The first high rise to be completed in the 21st century in Century City.
69=	555 Mission Street		487 (148)	33	2008	San Francisco	
69=	50 California Street		487 (148)	37	1972	San Francisco	
71	St. Regis San Francisco		484 (148)	42	2005	San Francisco	
72	Ten Thousand		483 (147)	40	2017	Los Angeles	Designed by Handel Architects.
73	The Century		478 (146)	42	2009	Los Angeles	
74=	100 Pine Center		476 (145)	33	1972	San Francisco	
74=	45 Fremont Street		476 (145)	34	1978	San Francisco	
76	Electra		475 (145)	43	2007	San Diego	Tallest residential tower in San Diego
77	333 Market Street		472 (144)	33	1979	San Francisco	
78	650 California Street		466 (142)	34	1964	San Francisco	Also known as the Hartford Building.
79	ARCO Tower/1055 West Seventh		462 (141)	33	1989	Los Angeles	
80	The Tower Burbank		460 (140)	32	1988	Burbank	Tallest building in Burbank, CA.
81	555 Mission Street		458 (140)	33	2008	San Francisco	
82=	Los Angeles City Hall		454 (138)	32	1928	Los Angeles	Tallest building constructed in Los Angeles in the 1920s. Tallest base-isolated structure in the world.
82=	Equitable Life Building		454 (138)	34	1969	Los Angeles	
84	South Park Center		452 (138)	32	1965	Los Angeles	
85	Metropolis Tower C		451 (137)	40	2018	Los Angeles	
86	LUMINA I		450 (137)	43	2015	San Francisco	
87	The Pinnacle Museum Tower		450 (137)	36	2005	San Diego	
88	The Infinity I		450 (137)	41	2008	San Francisco	
89	AT&T Switching Center		448 (137)	17	1961	Los Angeles	
90	100 First Plaza		447 (136)	27	1988	San Francisco	
91	Manchester Grand Hyatt Seaport		446 (136)	34	2003	San Diego	
92	5900 Wilshire		443 (135)	32	1971	Los Angeles	
93	Metropolis Tower B		442 (135)	38	2017	Los Angeles	Indigo Hotel
94=	399 Fremont Street		440 (134)	42	2016	San Francisco	
94=	340 Fremont Street		440 (134)	43	2019	San Francisco	
94=	500 Folsom		440 (134)	40	2016	San Francisco	
97	Hallasan Tower		439 (134)	38	2023	Los Angeles	
98	One California		438 (134)	32	1969	San Francisco	
99	San Francisco Marriott		436 (133)	39	1989	San Francisco	
100=	Russ Building		435 (133)	32	1927	San Francisco	Tied as the tallest building constructed in the city in the 1920s
100=	140 New Montgomery		435 (133)	26	1925	San Francisco	Tied as the tallest building constructed in the city in the 1920s
102	Jasper		430 (131)	39	2015	San Francisco	
103	Rancho Seco Nuclear Generating Station		425 (130)		1974	Sacramento	Two cooling towers at the decommissioned nuclear facility are the tallest buildings in the Central Valley.
104=	Harbor Club West		424 (129)	41	1992	San Diego	
104=	Harbor Club East		424 (129)	41	1992	San Diego	
106	Wells Fargo Center		423 (129)	30	1992	Sacramento	Tallest building in Sacramento.
107	MIRA		422 (129)	39	2020	San Francisco	
108	Hope+Flower Tower II		421 (128)	31	2019	Los Angeles	
109=	The Grande South at Santa Fe Place		420 (128)	39	2004	San Diego	
109=	The Grande North at Santa Fe Place		420 (128)	39	2005	San Diego	
109=	Vantage Pointe Condominium		420 (128)	41	2009	San Diego	
109=	JPMorgan Chase Building		420 (128)	31	2002	San Francisco	
109=	The Paramount		420 (128)	40	2002	San Francisco	
109=	The Infinity II		420 (128)	41	2009	San Francisco	
115=	Shoreline Gateway East Tower		417 (127)	35	2021	Long Beach	Tallest building in Long Beach.
115=	Providian Financial Building		417 (127)	30	1981	San Francisco	
117	Warner Center Plaza II		415 (126)	25	1991	Los Angeles	
118	MCI Center		414 (126)	33	1973	Los Angeles	
119=	Three Embarcadero Center		413 (126)	31	1977	San Francisco	
119=	Two Embarcadero Center		413 (126)	30	1974	San Francisco	
121	Advanced Equities Plaza		412 (126)	23	2005	San Diego	
122	595 Market Street		410 (125)	30	1979	San Francisco	
123	123 Mission Street		407 (124)	29	1986	San Francisco	
124=	101 Montgomery		404 (123)	28	1984	San Francisco	
124=	Embarcadero West		404 (123)	34	1989	San Francisco	
124=	Ordway Building		404 (123)	28	1970	Oakland	Tallest building in Oakland and in the Bay Area outside of San Francisco.
127	US Bank Tower		402 (123)	25	2008	Sacramento	This building topped out in 2007 to become the city's second tallest building.
128=	100 Van Ness Avenue		400 (122)	29	1974	San Francisco	
128=	LUMINA II		400 (122)	38	2015	San Francisco	
128=	Atlas		400 (122)	40	2020	Oakland	
128=	Fifteen Fifty		400 (122)	40	2020	San Francisco	
128=	Circa Tower I		400 (122)	35	2018	Los Angeles	Moxy Hotel
128=	Circa Tower II		400 (122)	35	2018	Los Angeles	

== Timeline of tallest buildings in California ==
Name	Years as tallest	Height	Floors	City	Notes
Montgomery Block	1853–1854	15 m (49 ft)	4	San Francisco	
Old Saint Mary's Cathedral	1854–1874	27 m (89 ft)		San Francisco	
California State Capitol	1874–1890	64 m (210 ft)	6	Sacramento	
Chronicle Building	1890–1898	66 m (217 ft)		San Francisco	
Call Building	1898–1914	96 m (315 ft)		San Francisco	
Oakland City Hall	1914–1922	98 m (322 ft)	18	Oakland	
Standard Oil Building	1922–1925	100 m (330 ft)		San Francisco	
Pacific Telephone Building	1925–1928	133 m (436 ft)		San Francisco	
Russ Building	1927–1928	133 m (436 ft)	32	San Francisco	
Los Angeles City Hall	1928–1965	138 m (453 ft)	32	Los Angeles	
Hartford Building	1965–1967	142 m (466 ft)	34	San Francisco	
44 Montgomery Street	1967–1969	172 m (564 ft)	43	San Francisco	
555 California Street	1969–1972	237 m (778 ft)	52	San Francisco	Then known as Bank of America Center
Transamerica Pyramid	1972–1973	260 m (850 ft)	48	San Francisco	
Aon Center	1973–1990	262 m (860 ft)	62	Los Angeles	
US Bank Tower	1990–2017	310 m (1,020 ft)	73	Los Angeles	Formerly Library Tower
Wilshire Grand Center	2017–present	335 m (1,099 ft)	73	Los Angeles	

== See also ==
- List of tallest buildings in Los Angeles
- List of tallest buildings in San Francisco
- List of tallest buildings in Sacramento
- List of tallest buildings in Oakland
- List of tallest buildings in Long Beach
- List of tallest buildings in San Diego
- List of tallest buildings in San Jose
