= Wilshire Grand Center =

Skyscraper in Los Angeles, California

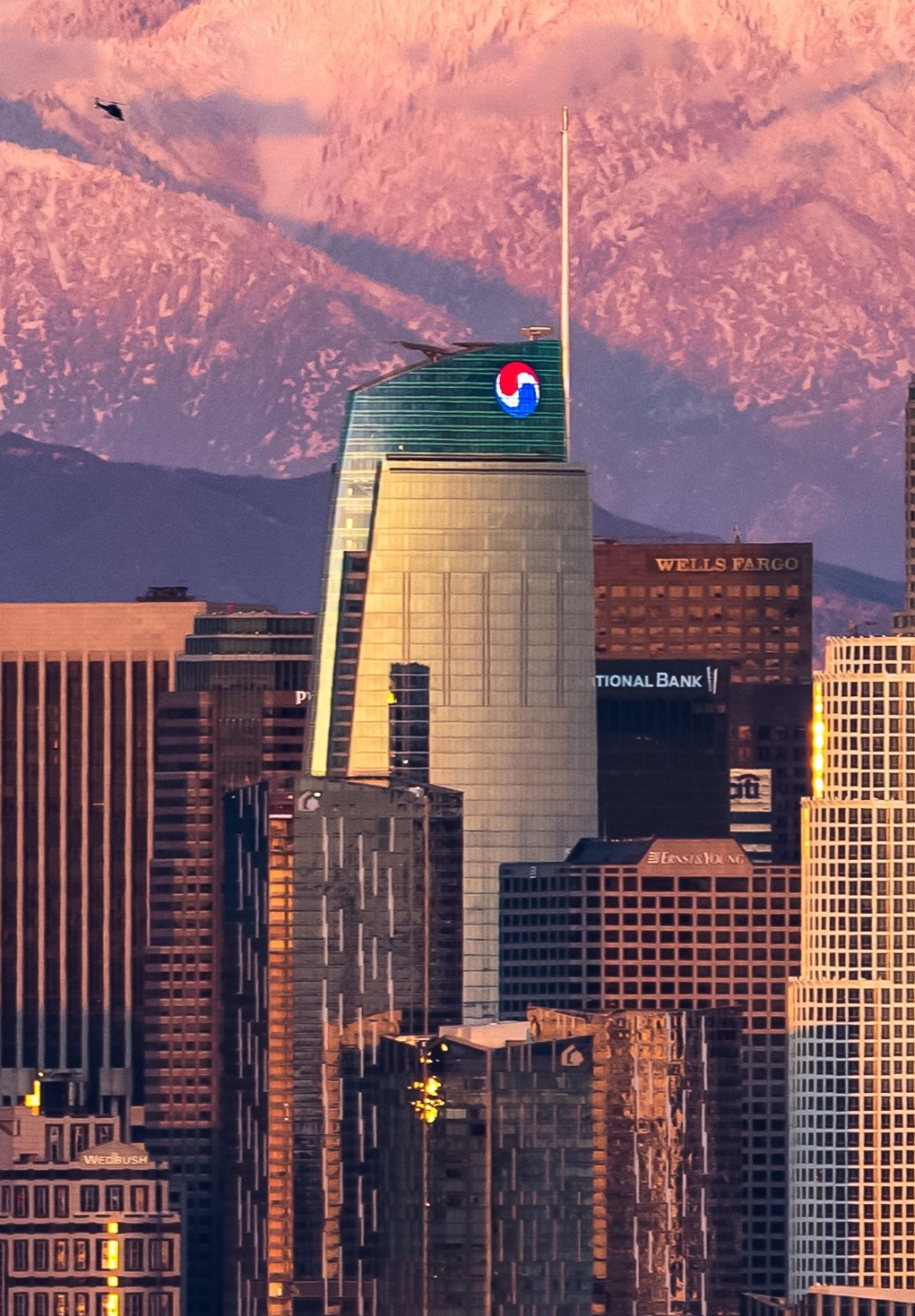
- WGC with LED disk display featuring the Korean Air logo

- Location within the Los Angeles metropolitan area Location within California Location within the United States
- Alternative names: Wilshire Grand Tower
- Hotel chain: InterContinental Los Angeles Downtown

Record height
- Tallest in California since 2017^{[I]}
- Preceded by: U.S. Bank Tower

General information
- Type: Hotel, restaurants, retail, offices, and observatory
- Architectural style: Metamodern
- Location: 900 Wilshire Boulevard; Los Angeles, California
- Coordinates: 34.0500°N 118.2593°W
- Construction started: February 15, 2014: 11 years ago
- Completed: June 23, 2017: 8 years ago
- Cost: US$900 million
- Owner: Hanjin Group; IJNR Investments Inc. Plant Holdings NA, Inc.
- Operator: Martin Project Management

Height
- Architectural: 1,100 ft (335.3 m)
- Roof: 928 ft (283 m)

Technical details
- Floor count: 73
- Floor area: 1,500,005 sq ft (139,355.0 m^{2})
- Lifts/elevators: 16

Design and construction
- Architect: AC Martin Partners
- Developer: Thomas Properties Group, LLC
- Structural engineer: Brandow & Johnston, Inc. Thornton Tomasetti; Cosentini Associates
- Services engineer: Glumac (MEP); Simpson Gumpertz & Heger (Fire)
- Main contractor: Turner Construction
- Known for: First skyscraper in L.A. without a flat roof

Other information
- Number of rooms: 889
- Number of restaurants: 6
- Number of bars: 4
- Public transit: Grand Avenue Arts/Bunker Hill

Website
- wilshiregrandcenter.com

Wilshire Grand Center is a 1,100-foot (335.3 m) skyscraper in the financial district of downtown Los Angeles, California, occupying the entire city block between Wilshire Boulevard and 7th, Figueroa, and Francisco streets. Completed in 2017, it is the tallest building (if including the spire) in the United States west of Chicago. Though the structural top (in this case, the 300-ft spire) of the Wilshire Grand surpasses L.A.'s U.S. Bank Tower by 82 ft (25 m) and the Salesforce Tower in San Francisco by 30 ft (9.1 m), the roofs of both the U.S. Bank Tower and the Salesforce Tower are higher than the roof of the Wilshire Grand. The Skyscraper Center lists the Wilshire Grand Center as the 15th-tallest building in the U.S. and the 95th-tallest in the world. It won the Structural Engineering Award 2019 Award of Excellence from the Council on Tall Buildings and Urban Habitat.

The building is part of a mixed-use hotel, retail, observation decks, shopping mall, and office complex. The Wilshire Grand Center includes 67,000 square feet (6,225 m^{2}) of retail, 677,000 square feet (62,895 m^{2}) of Class A office space, and the 889-room InterContinental Los Angeles Downtown. The hotel features the tallest open-air bar in the Western Hemisphere. The development of the complex is estimated to cost $1.2 billion.

== History ==
The original Wilshire Grand Hotel opened in 1952 as the Hotel Statler, on the site of the new Wilshire Grand. In 1950, the city of Los Angeles issued the largest single building permit at the time for the construction of the hotel, which cost over $15 million. The hotel quickly became a landmark of downtown Los Angeles, and over its 59-year lifespan attracted famous guests including President John F. Kennedy and Pope John Paul II.

In 1954, two years after its opening, Hilton Hotels & Resorts purchased the Statler Hotels chain, renaming the hotel the Statler Hilton in 1958. In 1968 Hilton completed a $2.5 million renovation of the hotel and renamed it the Los Angeles Hilton, and later the Los Angeles Hilton and Towers. Reliance Group later purchased the hotel in 1983 and invested $30 million in renovations. Korean Air purchased the Los Angeles Hilton from Reliance in 1989. They changed the hotel's management and it became the Omni Los Angeles Hotel in 1995 and then later the Wilshire Grand Hotel in 1999. Among the major events hosted, this included the 1952 Emmy Awards, the HQ for the 2006 Miss Universe Pageant.

Seeking to revive the Wilshire Grand as a landmark and icon of Los Angeles, chairman and CEO Cho Yang-ho of Hanjin Group conceived the idea of developing a new complex which would include the tallest building in Los Angeles, at 1,099 feet (335 m). It is also part of an urban development effort to revitalize the Figueroa Street corridor of downtown Los Angeles as a vibrant light-and-sign district, similar to New York's Times Square.

The original hotel closed on December 31, 2011. Demolition of the original building began on October 23, 2012, and continued for over a year until November 21, 2013, when a bottoming-out ceremony was held in the 106-foot pit (32 m) excavated for the towers.

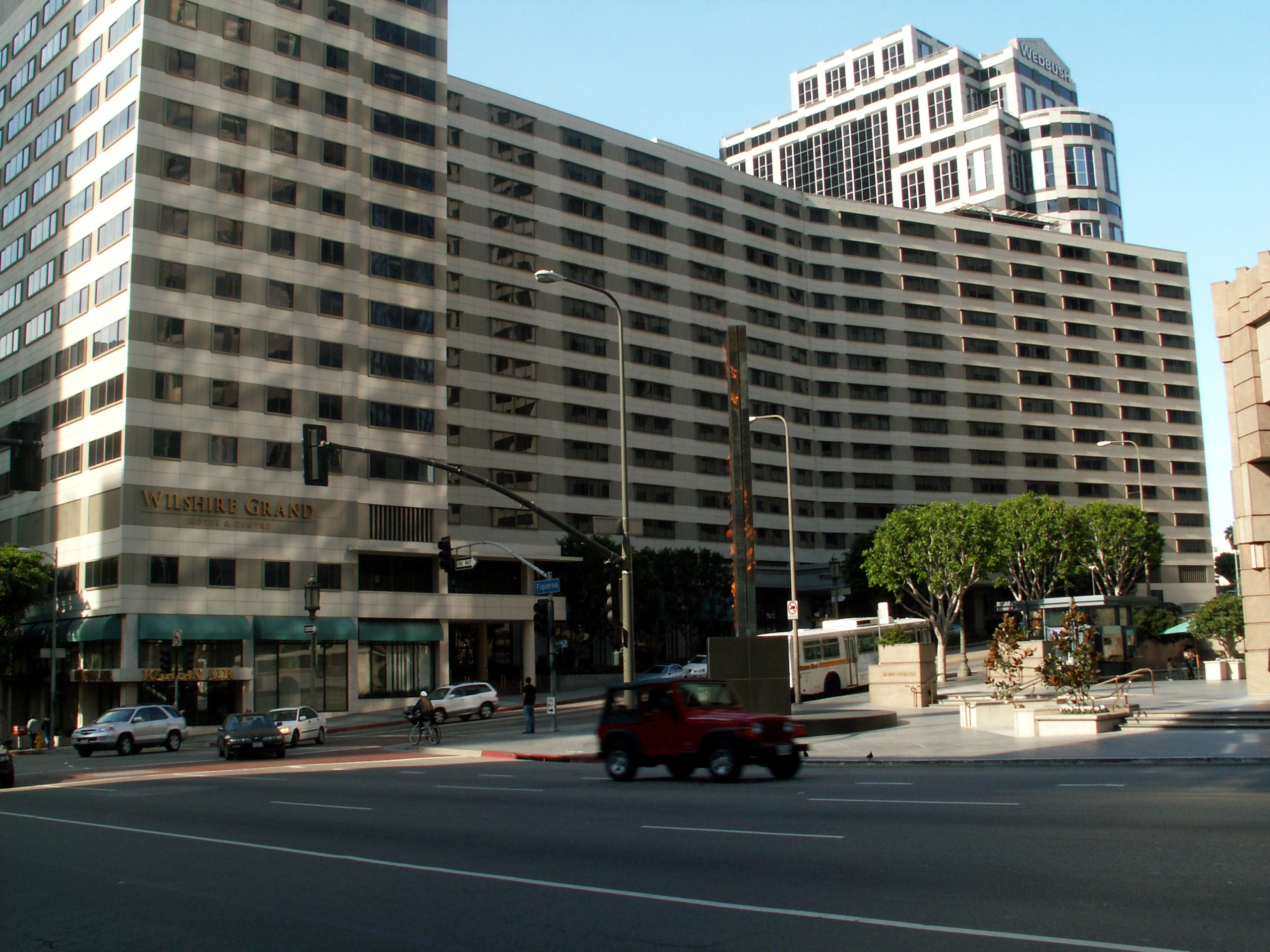
Wilshire Grand Hotel, 2006

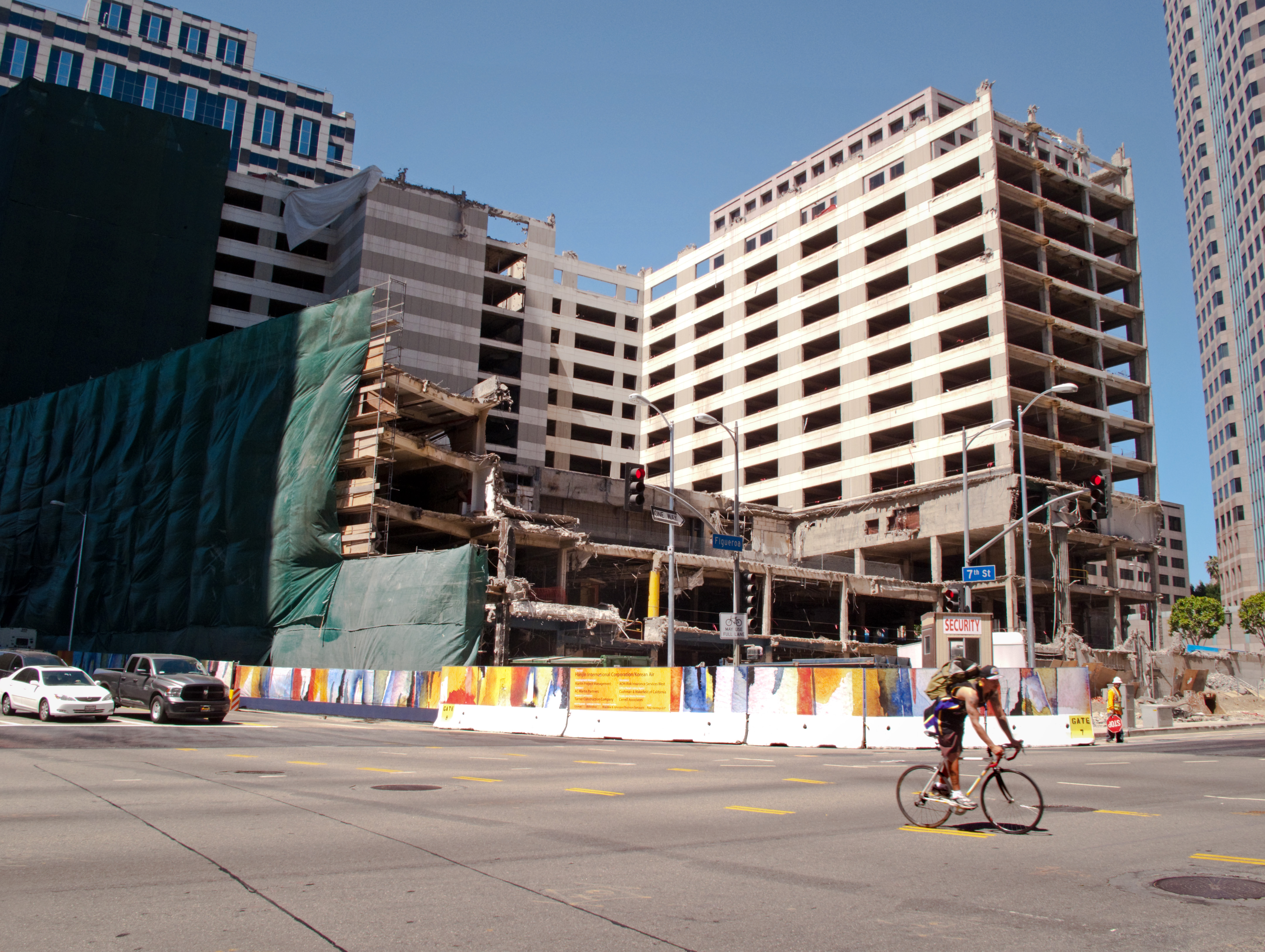
Wilshire Grand Hotel demolition, 2013

== Design ==
Originally envisioned as two towers, the taller of which would have been 1,250 feet (380 m) tall, the complex is now a single 1,100-foot (335 m), 73-story tower consisting of the 889-room InterContinental Los Angeles Downtown hotel, retail, observation deck and office space. The Los Angeles–based architectural firm, A.C. Martin Partners, oversaw the project and prepared the current design. They took over from Thomas Properties, which managed the early proposals, but which was replaced when the owners became dissatisfied with their approach.

A distinctive feature of the building is its sail-shaped crown which is illuminated with LED lighting at night. The giant LED configuration in the crown has displayed the Korean Air logo (a subsidiary of Hanjin, owner of the Wilshire Grand Center), the Intercontinental Hotel logo, operator of the tower's hotel, LA Rams logo, and LA28's colors. The LED lighting has a 60-hertz refresh rate, with any color, to do high-speed, pulsating color light shows. The crown has two street level LED 42 by 60 feet displays, of 250 million pixels each, nearly a fifth of a mile up in the sky, atop Los Angeles' tallest building, and the building itself is also covered in roughly 2.5 miles of LEDs running up and down the building’s spine.

The tower will spearhead part of a new planned light and sign district that will extend along the Figueroa Corridor down to L.A. Live. According to recent renderings, it is unclear however to what extent LED lighting and advertising will be applied. Lead designer David C. Martin said that the spire and the entire exterior skin of the tower will be filled with programmable LED lighting. The spire weighs 200,000 pounds (91,000 kg) and adds 294 feet (90 m) in height to the building.

The skyscraper is a distinctive part of the Los Angeles skyline, as it is the first building over 75 feet tall built since 1974 to not feature a "flat roof" design, an integral part of buildings in Los Angeles today. The pattern of buildings in Los Angeles to feature these "flat roofs" was the result of a 1974 fire ordinance which required all tall buildings in the city to include rooftop helipads in response to the Joelma Fire in São Paulo, Brazil, in which helicopters could not be used to effect rescues from the rooftop of the building because of the lack of a landing spot, and could otherwise have prevented many deaths. The Wilshire Grand was granted an exception by the Los Angeles City Fire Department however, as the building includes advances in fire safety and building technology (such as a reinforced concrete central core) which exceeds the city's current fire code. The building nevertheless has a helipad, but it is smaller than the uniform standard used in the city, and, like all helipads, can only be used in emergencies. The helipad is still big enough for a smaller rescue or fire helicopter to land onto.

The elevators in Wilshire Grand Center are supplied by Otis Elevator Company. The four double-deck express cars servicing the hotel's main lobby on the 70th floor travel at 1,600 feet per minute (490 m/min).

== Construction ==
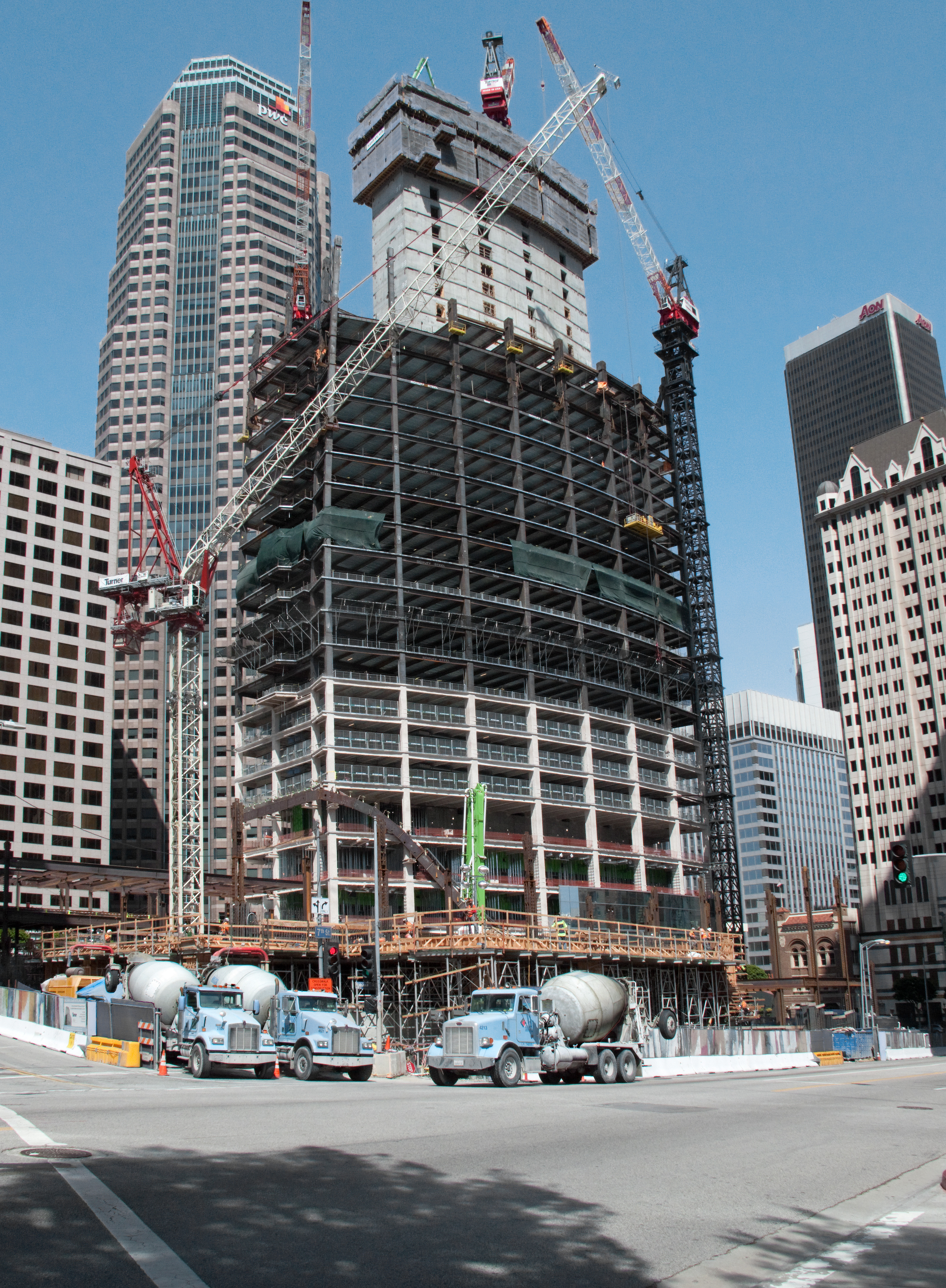
Construction of Wilshire Grand Center, May 2015

Turner Construction received the contracts for both the demolition of the former hotel and the construction of the new tower. The latter began on February 15, 2014, with a record 21,600 cu yd (16,500 m^{3}) pour of concrete in just 20 hours, (Note: On February 16, 2014, Guinness World Records announced that 21,200 cubic yards (16,200 m^{3}) of concrete, or 82 million lb (37 million kg), was poured at the site the previous day, breaking a prior record of 21,000 cubic yards (16,000 m^{3}) of concrete poured in one continuous pour, which was set in 1999 during the construction of The Venetian hotel in Las Vegas.) creating an 18-foot-thick (5 m) base for what would become the tallest building west of the Mississippi.

The foundation is set on bedrock known as the Fernando Formation; this siltstone has been compressed by an ocean that formerly covered the area and is a good base for a building.

The topping out ceremony was held on March 8, 2016, and when the spire was placed on September 3, the Wilshire Grand became the tallest building in Los Angeles at 1,100 feet. The supertall building opened on June 23, 2017.

The building, while recognized as "tallest" in the city by the Council on Tall Buildings and Urban Habitat, achieves this recognition through the height of its decorative sail and spire rather than highest occupiable floor space. From the ground, due to local topography, the Wilshire Grand sits visibly lower than other surrounding buildings. From the vantage of the building's 73rd floor observation deck, the US Bank Tower is markedly higher in elevation, and remains downtown Los Angeles' most prominent visual landmark.

== Ownership ==
This building is owned by the Hanjin Group (through its subsidiary Hanjin International), a South Korean conglomerate that also owns Korean Air. In 2020, Hanjin negotiated a refinancing of the building's debt ($900 million), which came with the condition of selling of the property in the future. Because of the COVID-19 pandemic, the value of the building dropped from $1.1 billion to $573 million. From 2011 to 2017, Hanjin received $60 million in tax breaks from the City of Los Angeles.

== Major tenants ==
=== Finance ===
- PacWest Bancorp (former)

=== Government ===
- Southern California Association of Governments

=== Hospitality ===
- InterContinental

=== Real estate ===
- Cushman & Wakefield

=== Transportation ===
- Metrolink

== Gallery ==
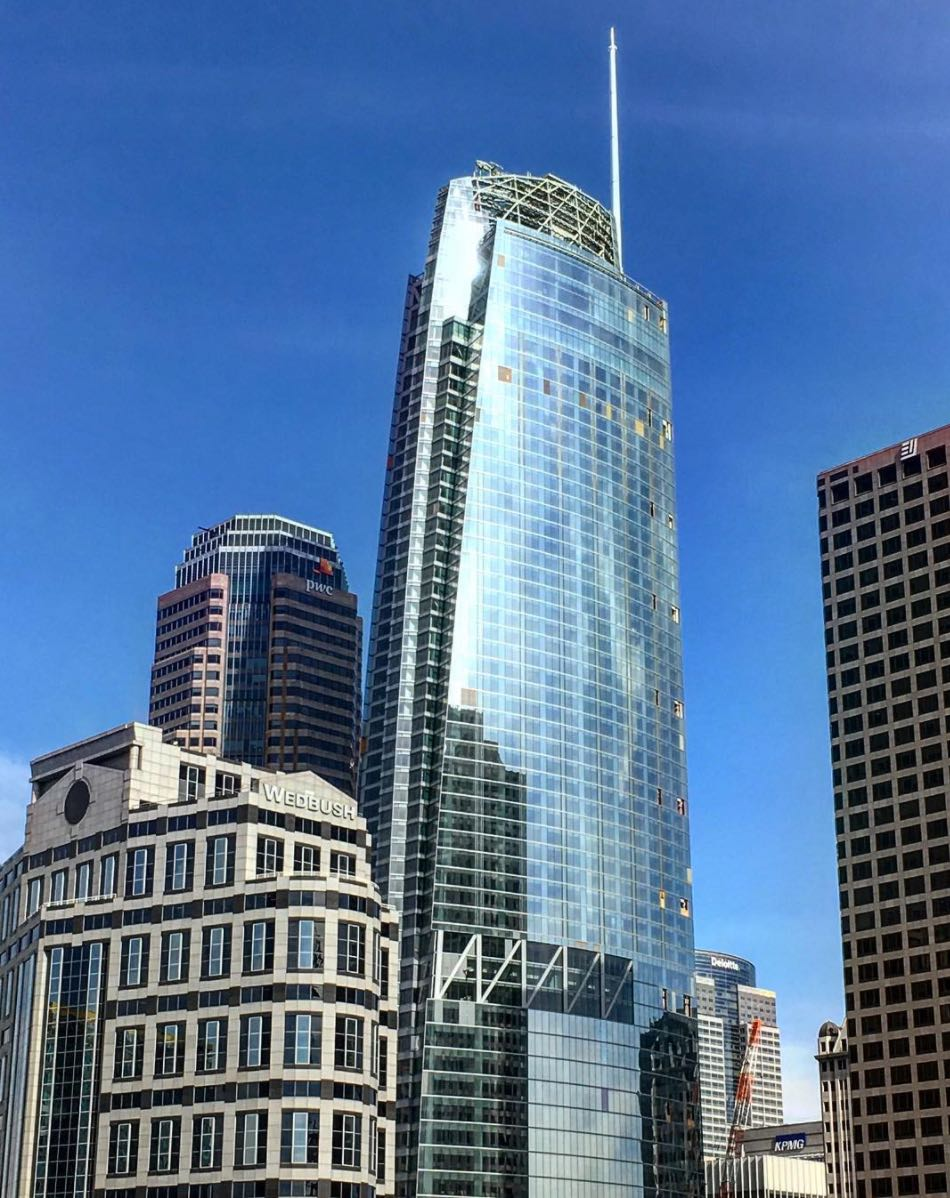

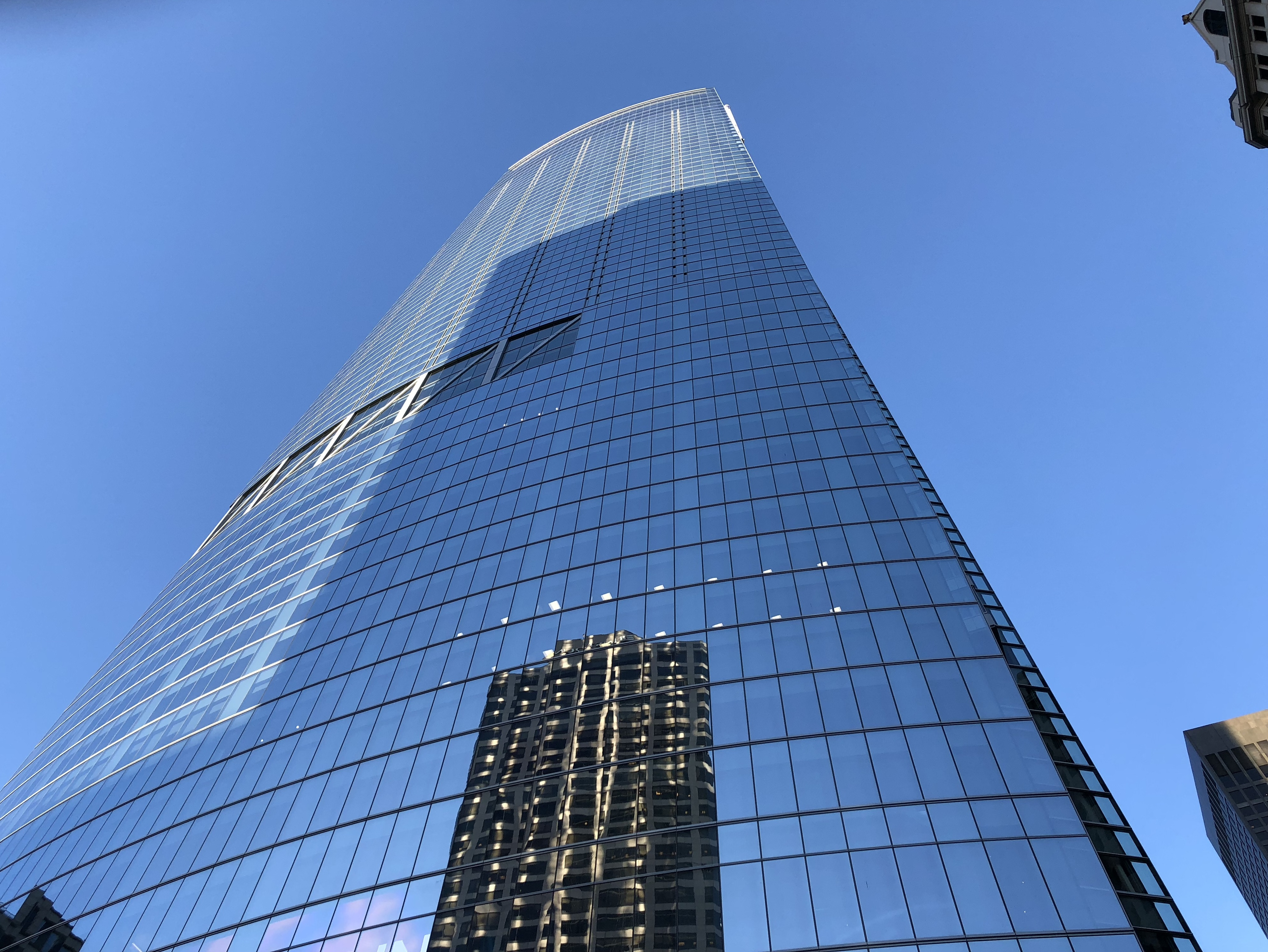

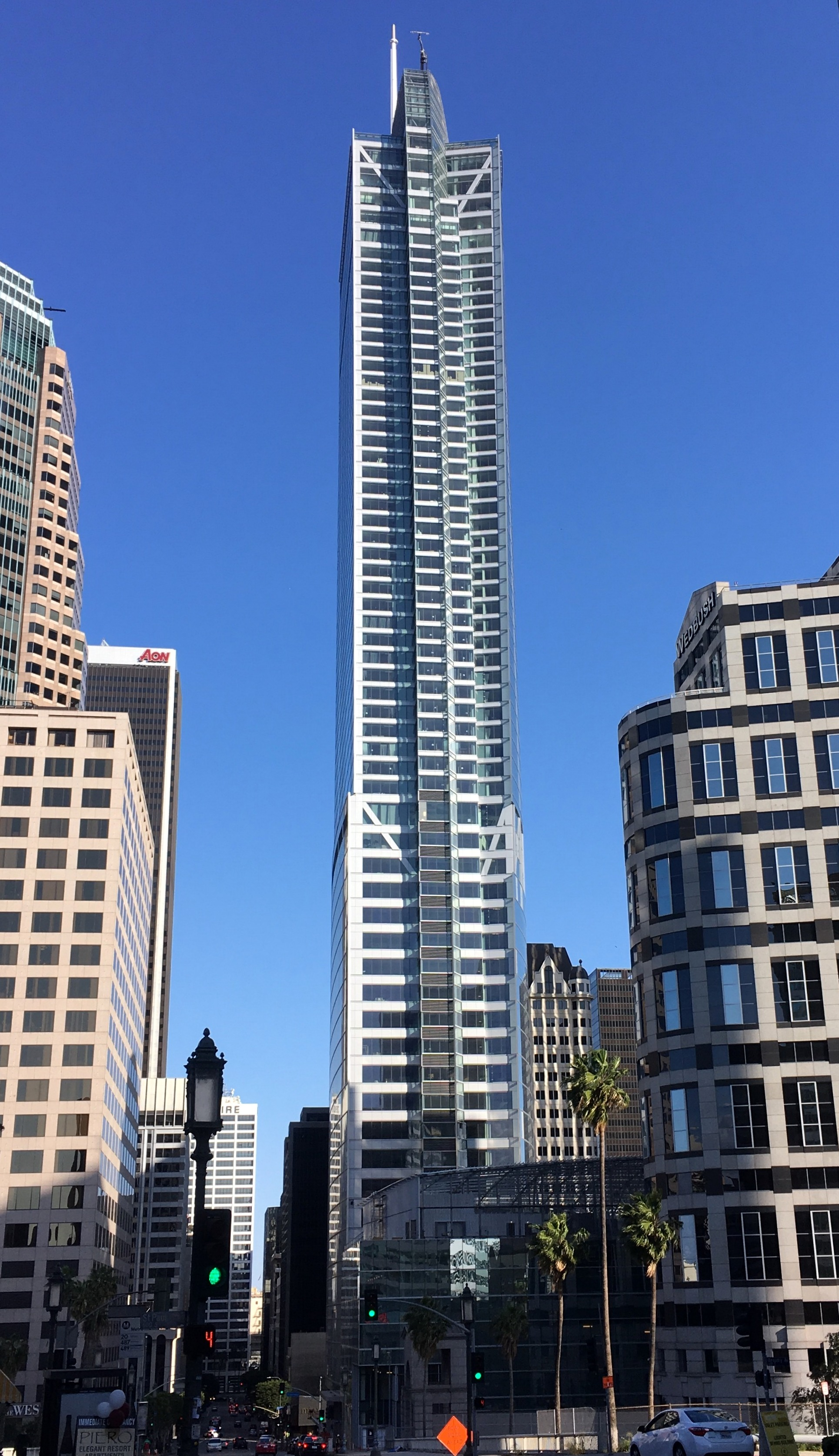

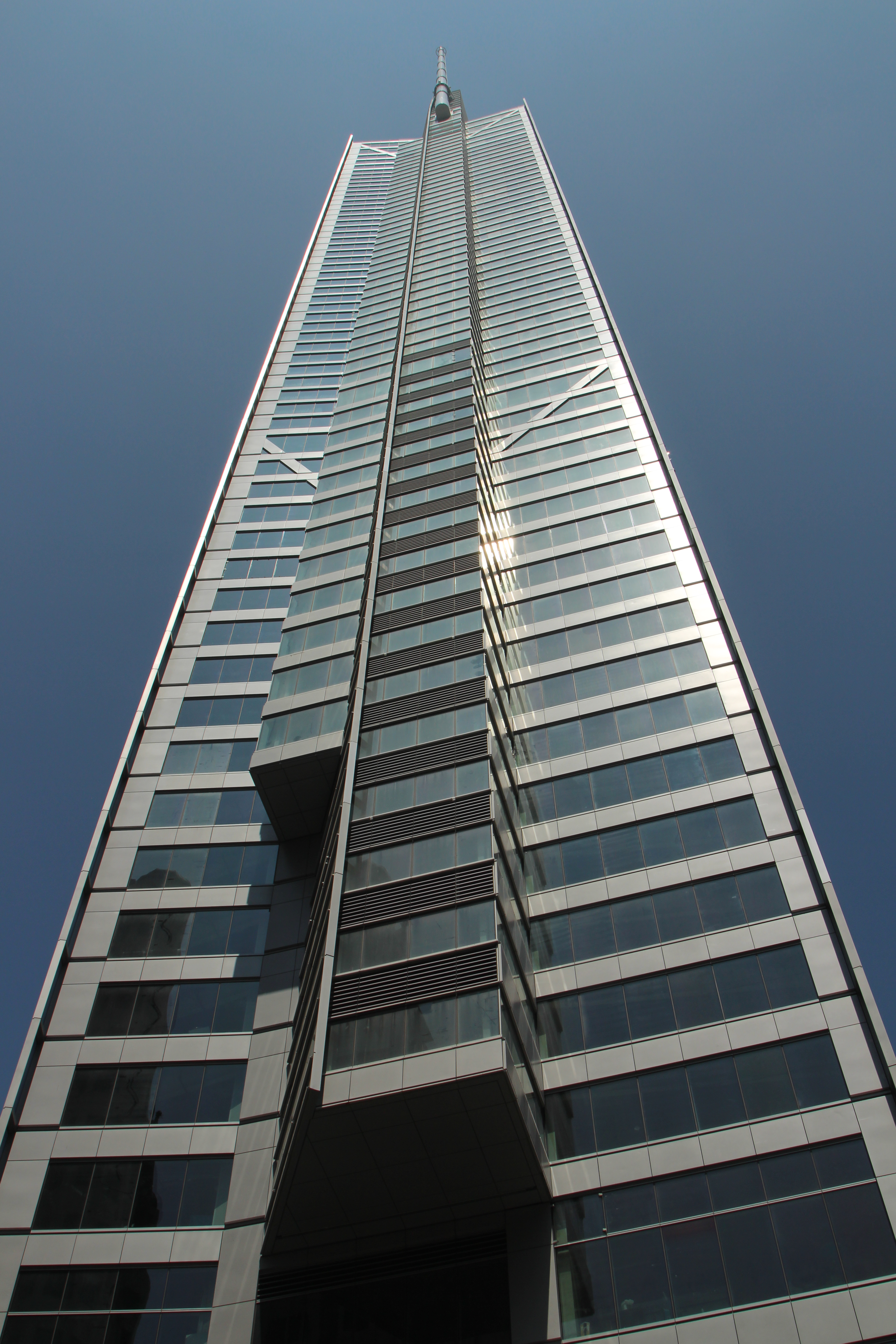

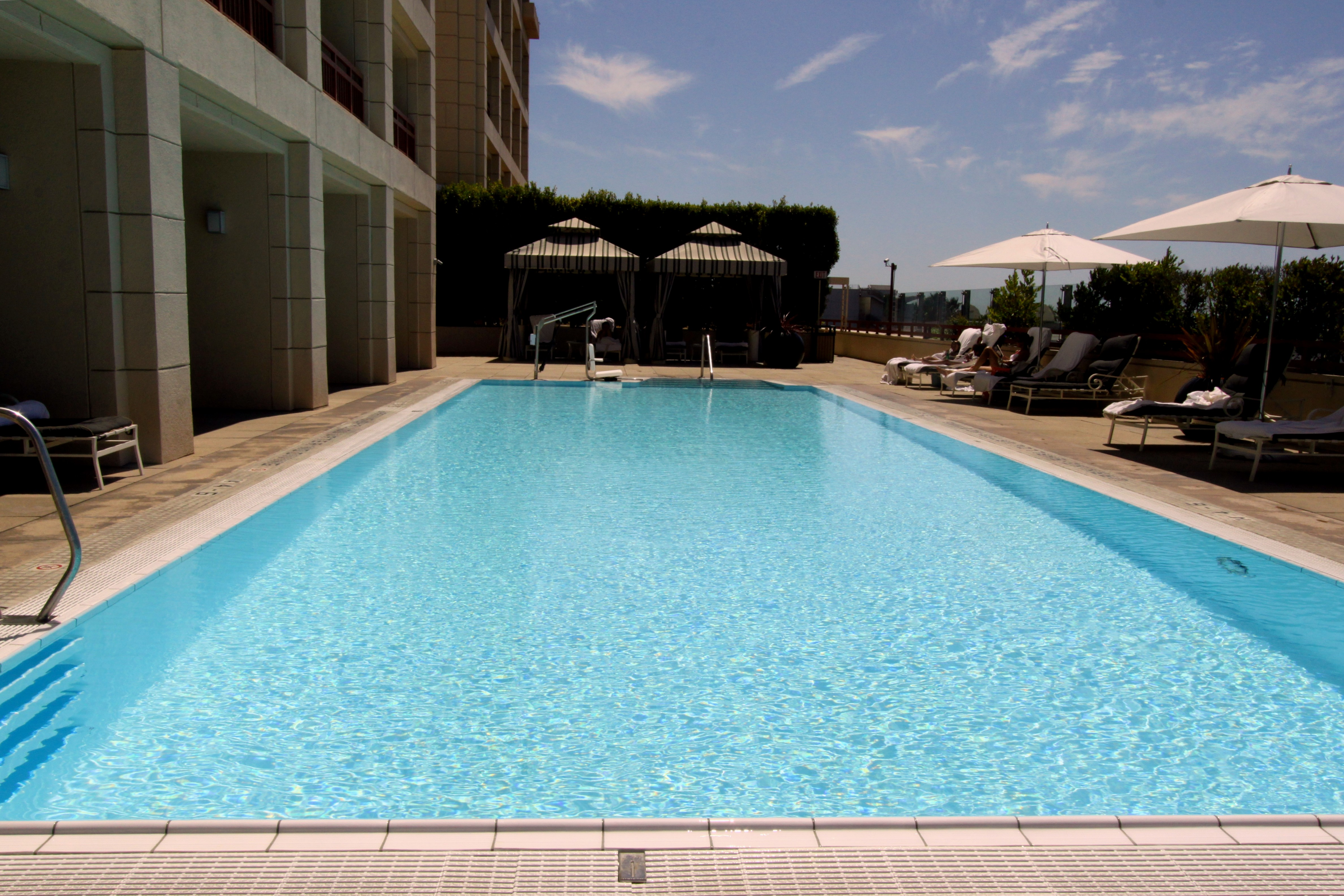
Pool at InterContinental Hotel

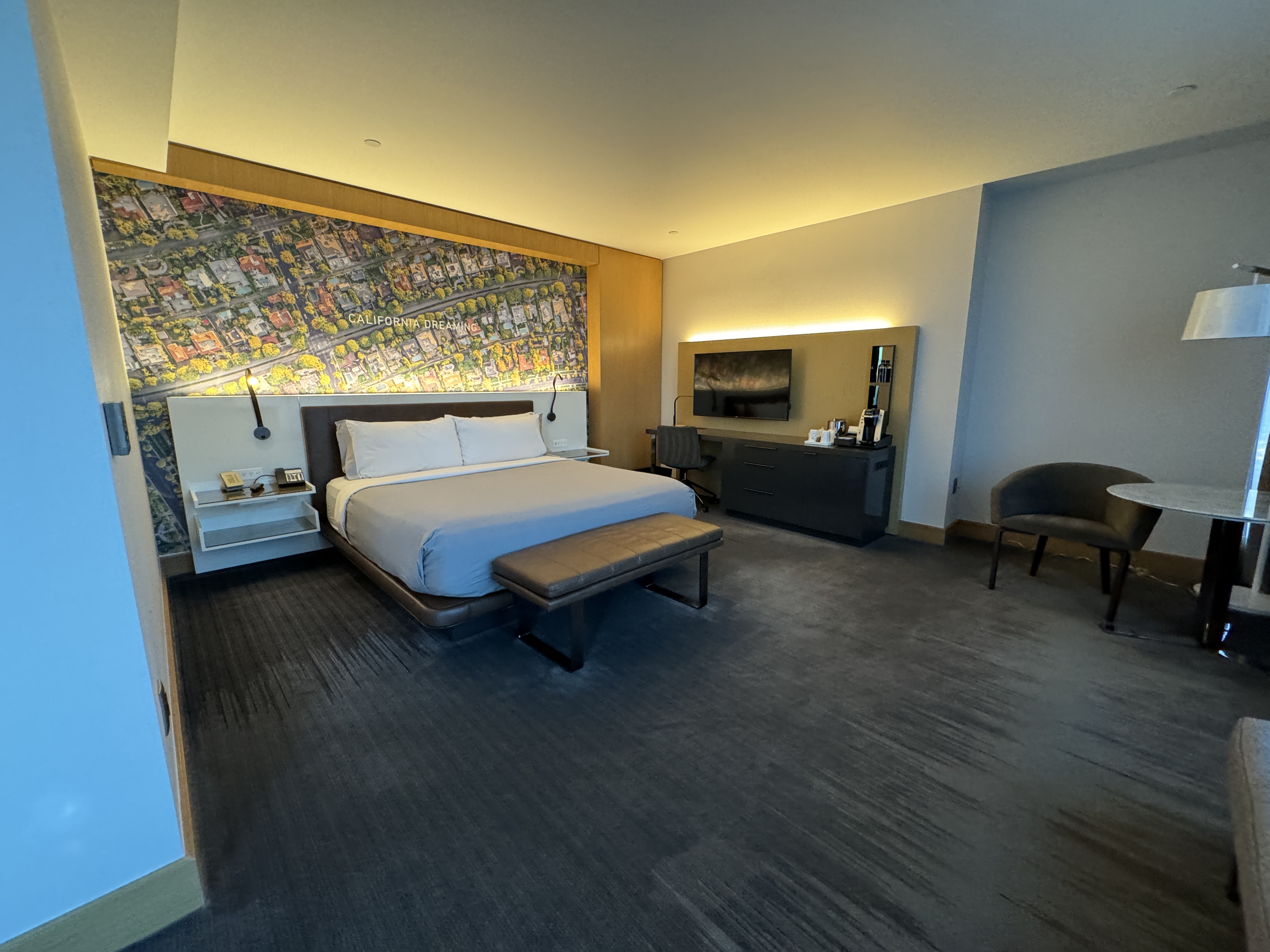
Hotel room at InterContinental Hotel

== Floor plans ==
- Floors basement to 7: Podium building with retail and InterContinental Los Angeles Downtown meeting rooms, gym, and pool.
- Floors 10 to 29: Offices
- Floors 31 to 68: InterContinental Los Angeles Downtown - hotel rooms
- Floor 69: InterContinental Los Angeles Downtown - restaurants - Sora & Dekkadance
- Floor 70: InterContinental Los Angeles Downtown - main lobby and Sky Bar
- Floor 71: InterContinental Los Angeles Downtown - restaurant - La Boucherie
- Floor 73: InterContinental Los Angeles Downtown - Spire 73, the tallest open-air bar in the Western Hemisphere

== See also ==
- List of tallest buildings in Los Angeles
- List of tallest buildings by U.S. state
- Downtown Los Angeles
- Wilshire Boulevard
