= Aon Center (Los Angeles) =

Office building in Los Angeles, California

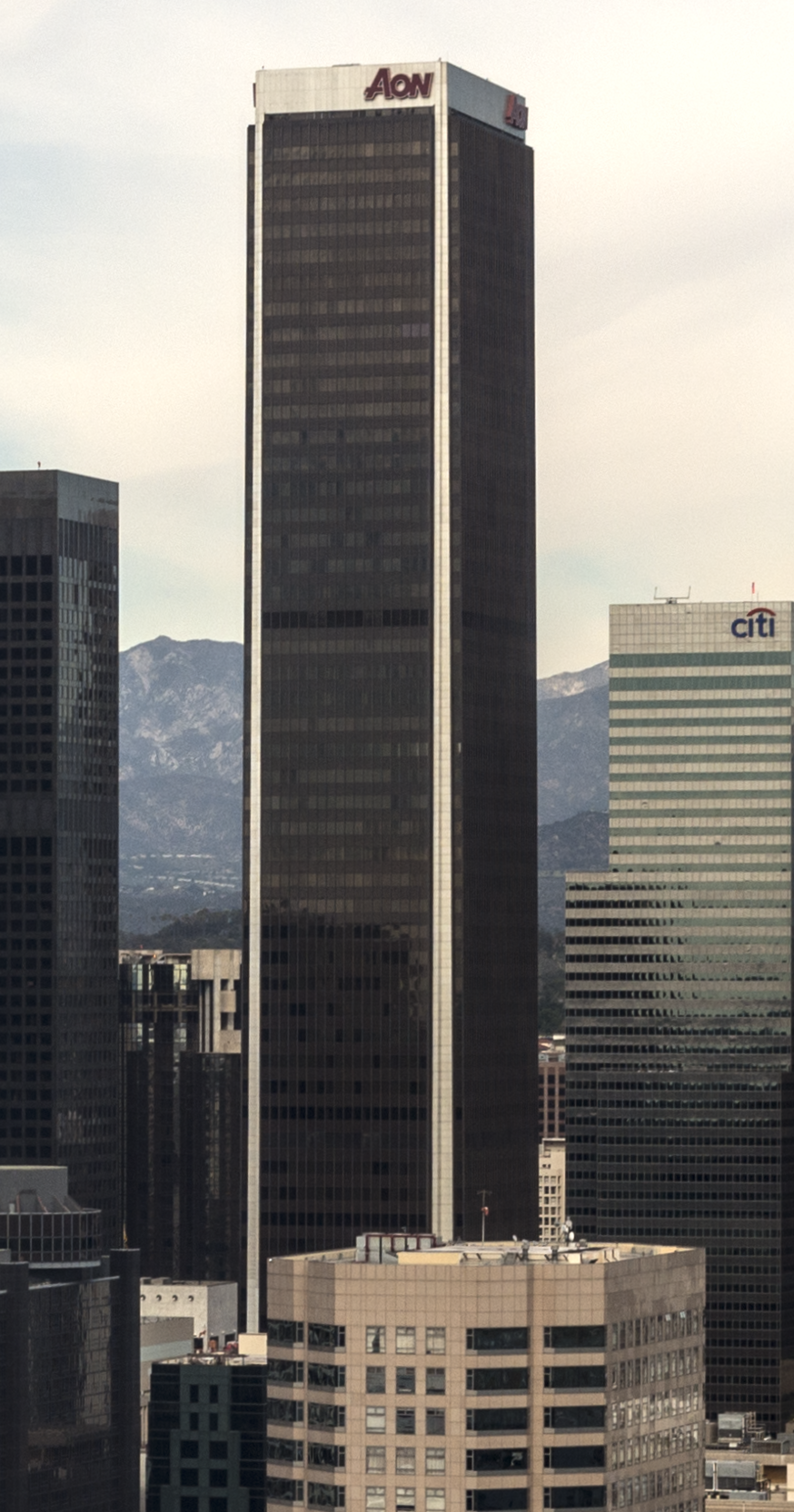

- Location within the Los Angeles metropolitan area Location within California Location within the United States
- Alternative names: United California Bank Building; First Interstate Tower

Record height
- Tallest in California from 1973 to 1986^{[I]}
- Preceded by: Transamerica Pyramid
- Surpassed by: U.S. Bank Tower (3rd)

General information
- Status: Completed
- Type: Commercial offices
- Location: 707 Wilshire Boulevard; Los Angeles, California
- Coordinates: 34.049167°N 118.256944°W
- Construction started: 1970
- Completed: 1973
- Owner: CAROLWOOD

Height
- Roof: 261.52 m (858.0 ft)

Technical details
- Floor count: 67
- Floor area: 116,128 m^{2} (1,249,990 sq ft)
- Lifts/elevators: 30

Design and construction
- Architect: Charles Luckman
- Structural engineer: Erkel Greenfield Associates
- Main contractor: CL Peck Contractor

Other information
- Parking: 822

Aon Center, formerly United California Bank Building and First Interstate Tower, is a 62-story, 858 ft (262 m) Modernist office skyscraper at 707 Wilshire Boulevard in downtown Los Angeles, California. Site excavation started in late 1970, and the tower was completed in 1973. Designed by Charles Luckman, the rectangular bronze-clad building with white trim is remarkably slender for a skyscraper in a seismically active area. It is the third tallest building in Los Angeles, the fourth tallest in California, and the 58th tallest in the United States. The logo of the Aon Corporation, its anchor tenant, is displayed at the top in red.

== History ==
Aon Center was originally named the United California Bank Building from its completion in 1973 until 1981, when it became First Interstate Tower. During the 1984 Summer Olympics, the 1984 Olympics logo was displayed on the north and south sides of the building's crown, as First Interstate Bank was a major sponsor of the games. It was the tallest building west of the Mississippi River when built, until 1982 when it was surpassed by the Texas Commerce Tower (now known as JPMorgan Chase Tower) in Houston. Upon its completion in 1973, the building was the tallest in the world outside of New York and Chicago. It remained the tallest building in Los Angeles until 1989, when Library Tower (now U.S. Bank Tower) was completed. Between 1998 and 2001, there were no logos on the building.

Shorenstein, which purchased the Aon Center in 2014, sold the building to Carolwood, the firm controlled by Adam Rubin and Andrew Shanfeld, in December 2023.

=== Fire ===
On May 4, 1988, a fire began on the 12th floor just after 10:00 PM; it burned for about four hours. The fire destroyed five floors, injured 40 people, and left an operating engineer dead because the elevator opened onto the burning 12th floor. The fire was so severe because the building was not equipped with a sprinkler system, which was not required for office towers at the time of its construction. A sprinkler system was 90 percent installed at the time of the fire; however, the system was inoperative, awaiting the installation of water flow alarms. The fire was eventually contained at 2:19 AM, and caused $400 million in damage. Repair work took four months. Because of the fire, building codes in Los Angeles were modified, requiring all high-rises to be equipped with fire sprinklers. This modified a 1974 ordinance that had only required new buildings to contain fire sprinkler systems.

== Gallery ==
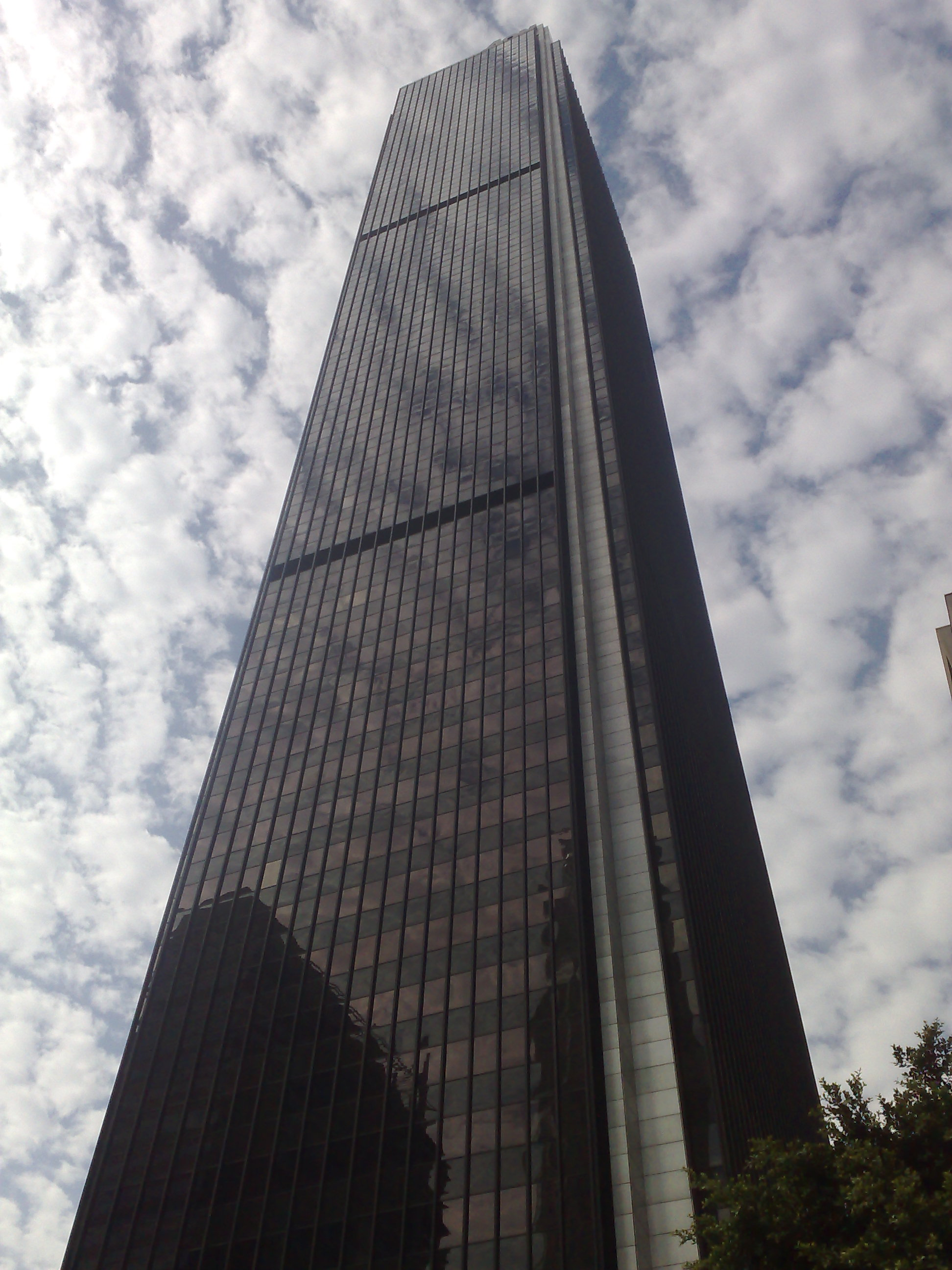

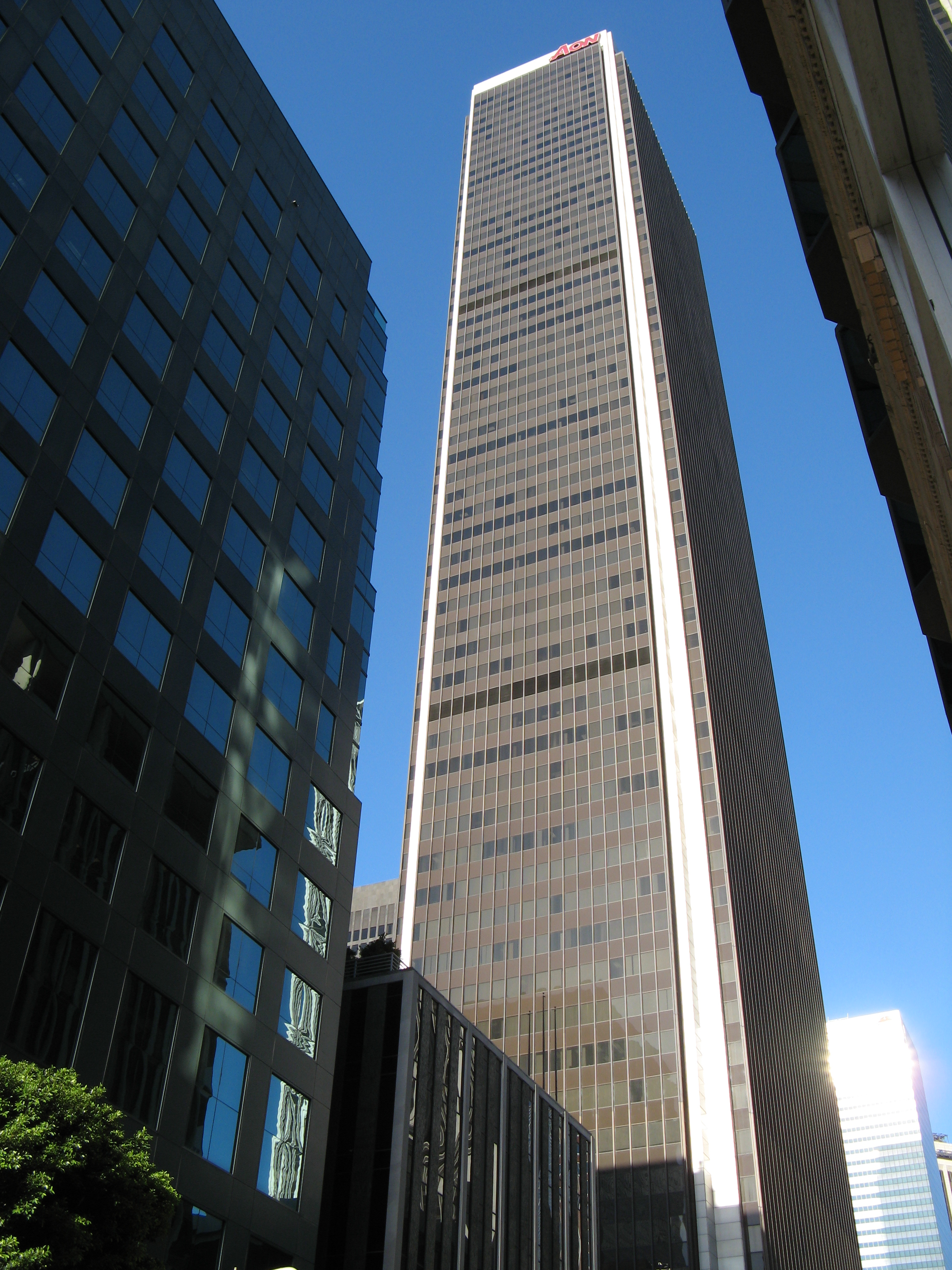

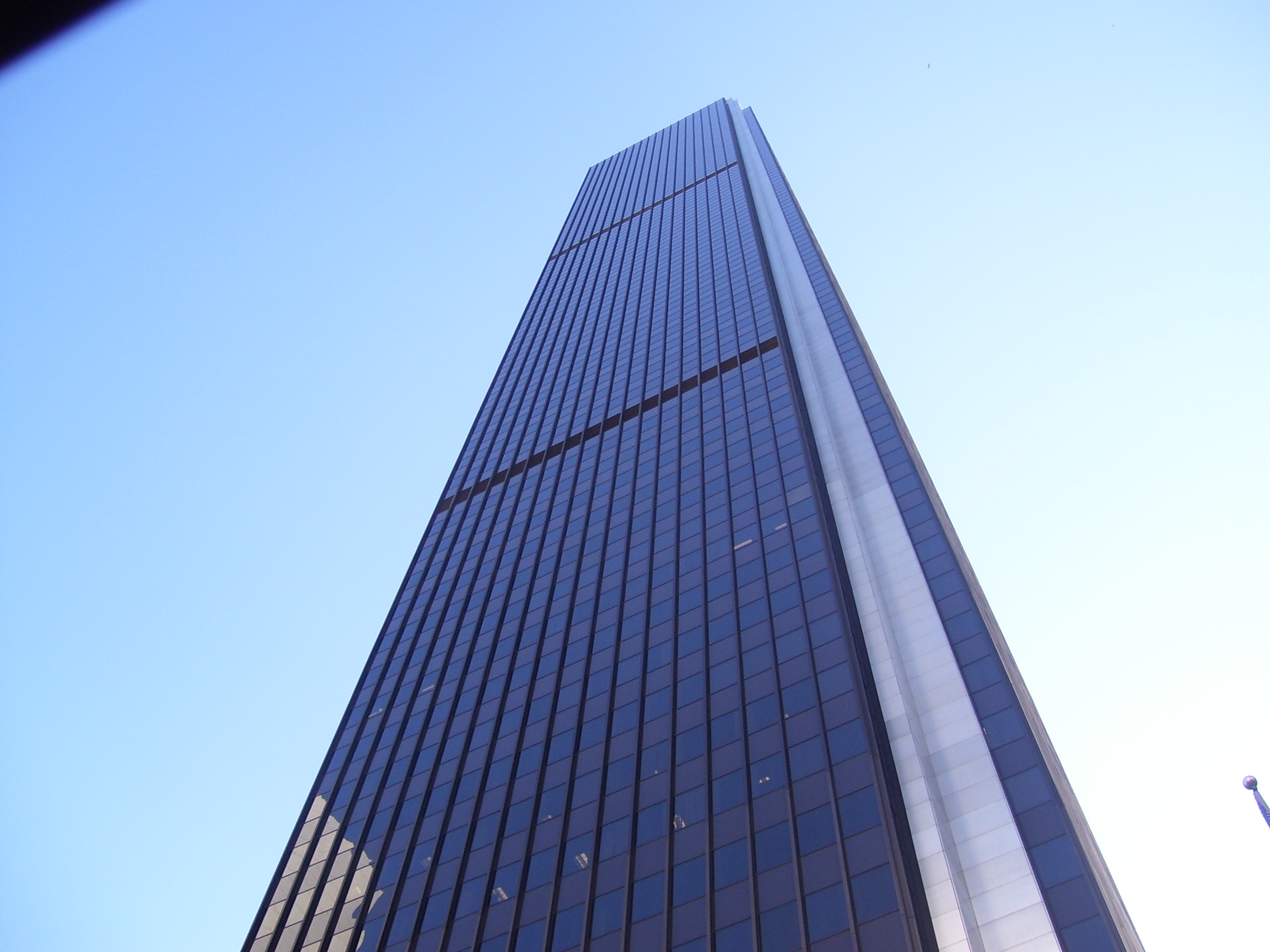

== See also ==
- List of tallest buildings in Los Angeles

Records
| Preceded by Transamerica Pyramid | Tallest building in the United States west of Mississippi River; 1973–1982 | Succeeded by JPMorgan Chase Tower |
