= U.S. Bank Tower (Los Angeles) =

Skyscraper in California, US

- U.S. Bank Tower in 2012

- Location within Los Angeles
- Former names: Library Tower; First Interstate Bank World Center

Record height
- Tallest in California from 1989 to 2016^{[I]}
- Preceded by: Aon Center (4th)
- Surpassed by: Wilshire Grand Center

General information
- Type: Commercial offices
- Architectural style: Postmodernism
- Location: 633 West Fifth Street; Los Angeles, California, United States
- Coordinates: 34.0510°N 118.2542°W
- Current tenants: See tenants
- Groundbreaking: June 23, 1987
- Construction started: January 30, 1988
- Topped-out: April 18, 1989
- Completed: October 1989
- Opened: 1990
- Cost: US$350 million
- Owner: Silverstein Properties Inc.
- Landlord: Silverstein Properties Inc.

Height
- Architectural: 1,018 ft (310 m)
- Top floor: 968 ft (295 m)

Technical details
- Floor count: 73 (+2 below ground)
- Floor area: 1,432,540 sq ft (133,087 m^{2})
- Lifts/elevators: 24

Design and construction
- Architects: Pei Cobb Freed & Partners; Ellerbe Becket
- Developer: Maguire Properties
- Structural engineer: CBM Engineers; James A. Knowles & Associates
- Main contractor: Turner Construction Company

Other information
- Public transit: Pershing Square

Website
- usbanktower.com

U.S. Bank Tower, known locally as the Library Tower and formerly as the First Interstate Bank World Center, is a 1,018-foot (310.3 m) skyscraper located in the Financial District of downtown Los Angeles, California. Construction of the tower began in 1987 with completion in 1989. The building was designed by Henry N. Cobb of the architectural firm Pei Cobb Freed & Partners and cost $350 million to build.

It is one of the most recognizable buildings in Los Angeles, and often appears in establishing shots for the city in films and television programs.

The building is, by structural height, the third-tallest building in California, the second-tallest building in Los Angeles, and the 24th-tallest building in the United States.

== Ownership ==
U.S. Bank Tower in Los Angeles was sold to OUE Ltd (OUE), a diversified real estate owner, developer and operator group, in 2013. OUE, a Singapore-listed company run by Indonesian billionaire Stephen Riady, acquired the tower and other related assets for $367.5 million. OUE acquired the 72-floor office building, the adjacent Maguire Gardens park, and a parking lot from a unit of Los Angeles–based real-estate investment trust MPG Office Trust Inc.

On July 20, 2020, it was announced that Larry Silverstein (Silverstein Properties), the developer of the World Trade Center, purchased the building for reportedly 430 million dollars. The deal closed in late September. They held a grand opening in April 2023 after creating a brand new lobby and more food options. The renovations included flexible workspaces, an art installation, and other improvements for the tenants.

== History ==
The building was first known and is alternatively known today as the Library Tower because it was built as part of the $1 billion Los Angeles Central Library redevelopment area, following two disastrous fires at the library in 1986, and its location across the street. The City of Los Angeles sold air rights to the developers of the tower to help pay for the reconstruction of the library. The building was also known for a time as First Interstate Bank World Center but the name Library Tower was restored after First Interstate Bancorp merged with Wells Fargo Bank. In March 2003, the property was leased by U.S. Bancorp and the building was renamed the U.S. Bank Tower.

The tower has a large glass crown at its top that is illuminated at night. On February 28, 2004, two 23 m (75 ft) “U.S. Bank” logo signs were installed on the crown, amid controversy for their effect on the aesthetic appearance of the building, much like the previous First Interstate Bank logos were placed on the crown between 1990 and 1998.

=== Terrorist target ===
On June 16, 2004, the 9/11 Commission reported that the original plan for the September 11 attacks called for the hijacking of ten planes, one of which was to be crashed into the building.

On October 6, 2005, House officials stated that the government had foiled a previously undisclosed second plot to crash a plane into the building in mid-2002. In his televised 2007 State of the Union Address, President George W. Bush asserted that American counterterrorism officials foiled a plot to fly planes into the tower. According to President Bush, Al-Qaeda leader Khaled Sheikh Mohammed's plan was to use Asian confederates from Jemaah Islamiyah recruited by Islamic militant Hambali for the hijacking. President Bush asserted the hijackers were going to use shoe bombs to breach the plane's cockpit door. Some counter-terrorism experts have expressed doubt that the plot was ever fully developed or likely to occur.

=== OUE Skyspace ===
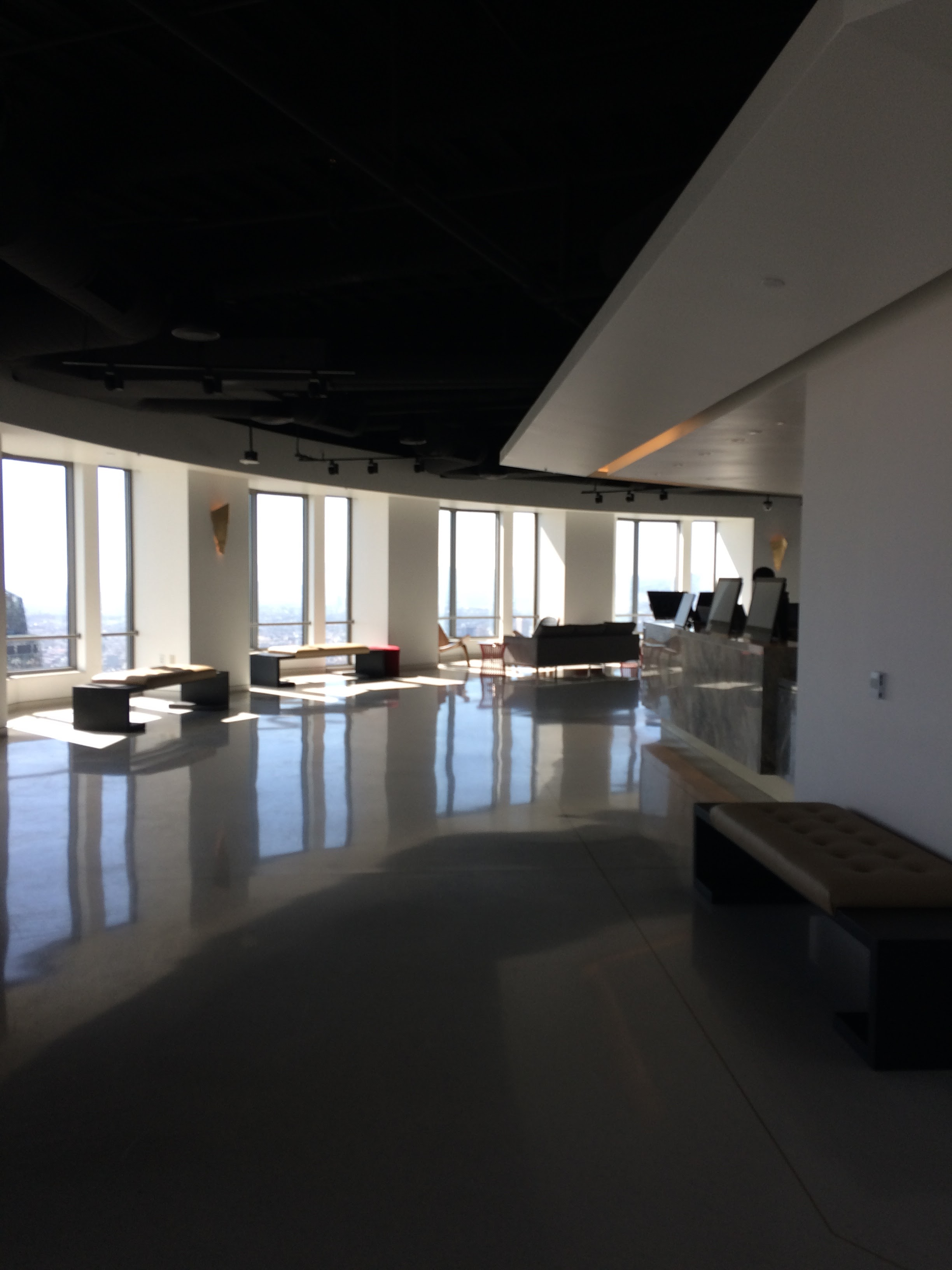
Interior of the OUE Skyspace on the 71st floor of the U.S. Bank Tower looking northwest.

In July 2014, OUE Ltd. (OUE), the new owners of the skyscraper, announced construction of an observation deck named OUE Skyspace. on the 69th and 70th floors and a restaurant named 71Above on the 71st floor. The facilities opened on June 24, 2016, following remodeling and construction costing $31 million that included a makeover of the ground floor lobby as well as a separate second floor entrance for tourists, and a skylobby and exhibit hall on the 54th floor. Access to the observation deck cost $25 per person. For an additional $8, visitors could take a trip down a transparent glass slide affixed to the outside of the building between the 70th and 69th floors known as the Skyslide.

OUE Skyspace closed temporarily due to the COVID-19 pandemic in March 2020. On October 26, 2020, it was announced that the closure was permanent. In May 2021, it was announced that a renovation by the new owner of the tower would result in the conversion of the observation deck attraction back to office space and the removal of the slide, due to complaints from office tenants.

=== Silverstein Properties ===
With the building 78% leased, New York developer Silverstein Properties announced plans in 2021 to make changes to the building to attract tenants. The tourist attraction will be converted to office space or communal areas. The 71Above restaurant will remain open while the 54th floor, where people going higher must change elevators, will be turned into a co-working lounge with workstations, food and beverage options, and a catering kitchen for events.

== Major tenants ==
=== Consultancy ===
- Cornerstone Research
- Mercer
- McKinsey & Company

=== Economic development ===
- Los Angeles County Economic Development Corporation

=== Engineering ===
- Walter P Moore

=== Finance ===
- Bank Mizrahi-Tefahot
- Lincoln International
- U.S. Bancorp

=== Law ===
- Akerman LLP
- Akin Gump Strauss Hauer & Feld
- Dechert
- Gordon Rees Scully Mansukhani
- Hinshaw & Culbertson LLP
- Jenner & Block
- King & Spalding
- Lewis Brisbois Bisgaard & Smith
- Littler Mendelson
- Morgan & Morgan
- Perkins Coie
- Steptoe

=== Media ===
- Pizzaply Media
- Thomson Reuters

== Tallest rooftop helipad ==
The US Bank Tower was the world's tallest building with a rooftop helipad until the China World Trade Center Tower III in Beijing, which was completed in 2010 and whose rooftop helipad is 1,083 feet (330 m) high.

As of March 2018, the world's tallest building with a rooftop helipad was the Guangzhou International Finance Center, which also was completed in 2010 and whose rooftop helipad is 1,439 feet (439 m) high.

== In popular culture ==
In 1994, the building was featured on Visiting... with Huell Howser.

The building is featured in several disaster films, such as Independence Day, The Day After Tomorrow, D-War, 2012 and San Andreas.

The building is also featured in the popular video game franchise Grand Theft Auto, appearing as the fictional "Maze Bank Tower" in multiple games set in a fictional version of Los Angeles, called Los Santos. Its most notable appearances are in Grand Theft Auto V as well as Grand Theft Auto: San Andreas.

It is a location in the 2023 video game Starfield.

The building's rooftop was featured in the 2001 film Rush Hour 2.

== Gallery ==
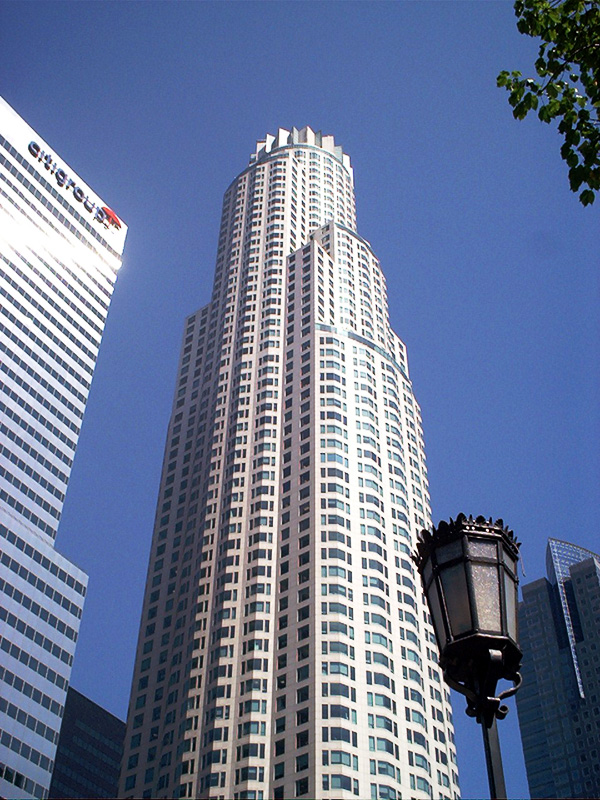
From The Maguire Gardens of the Los Angeles Public Library

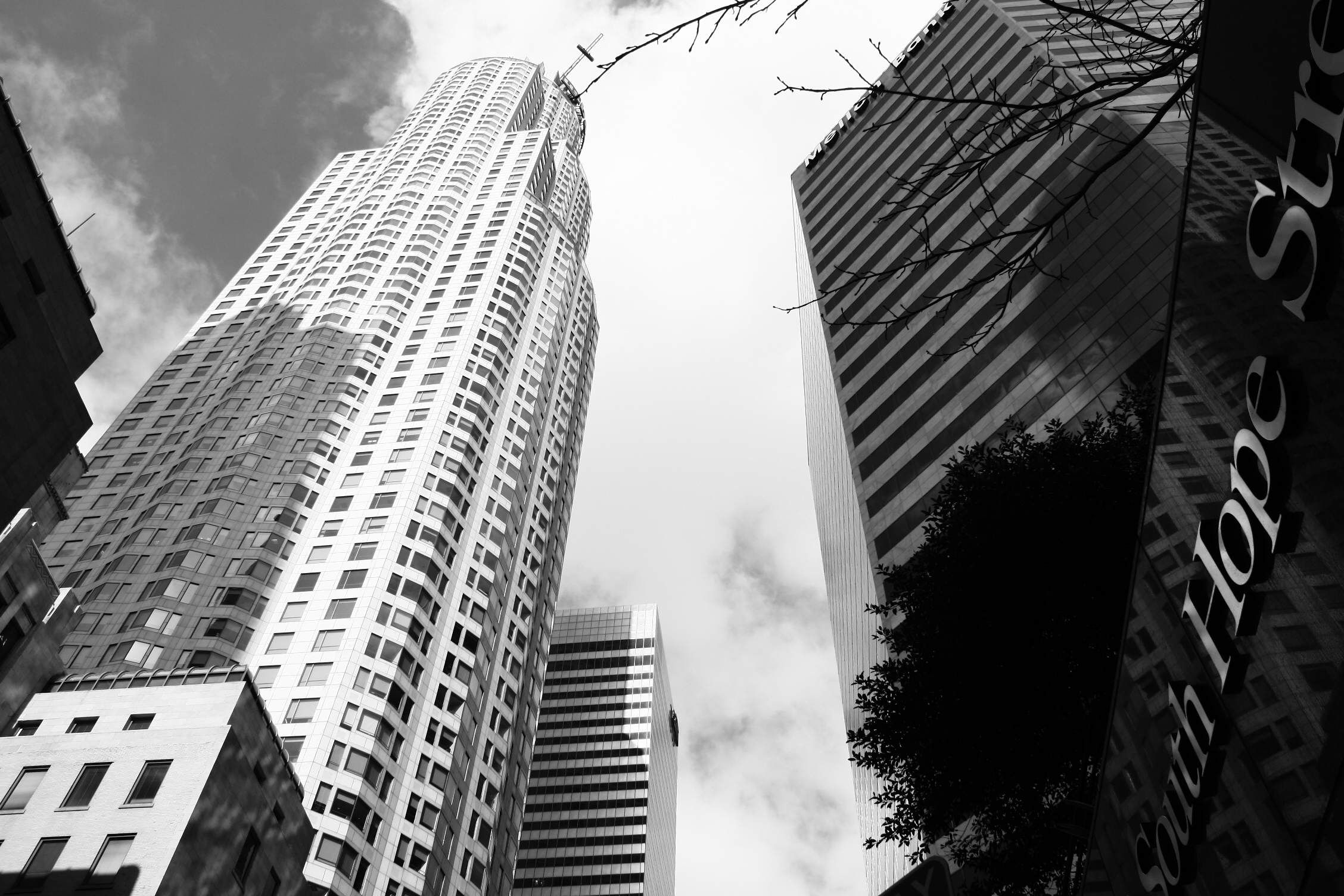
From South Hope Street

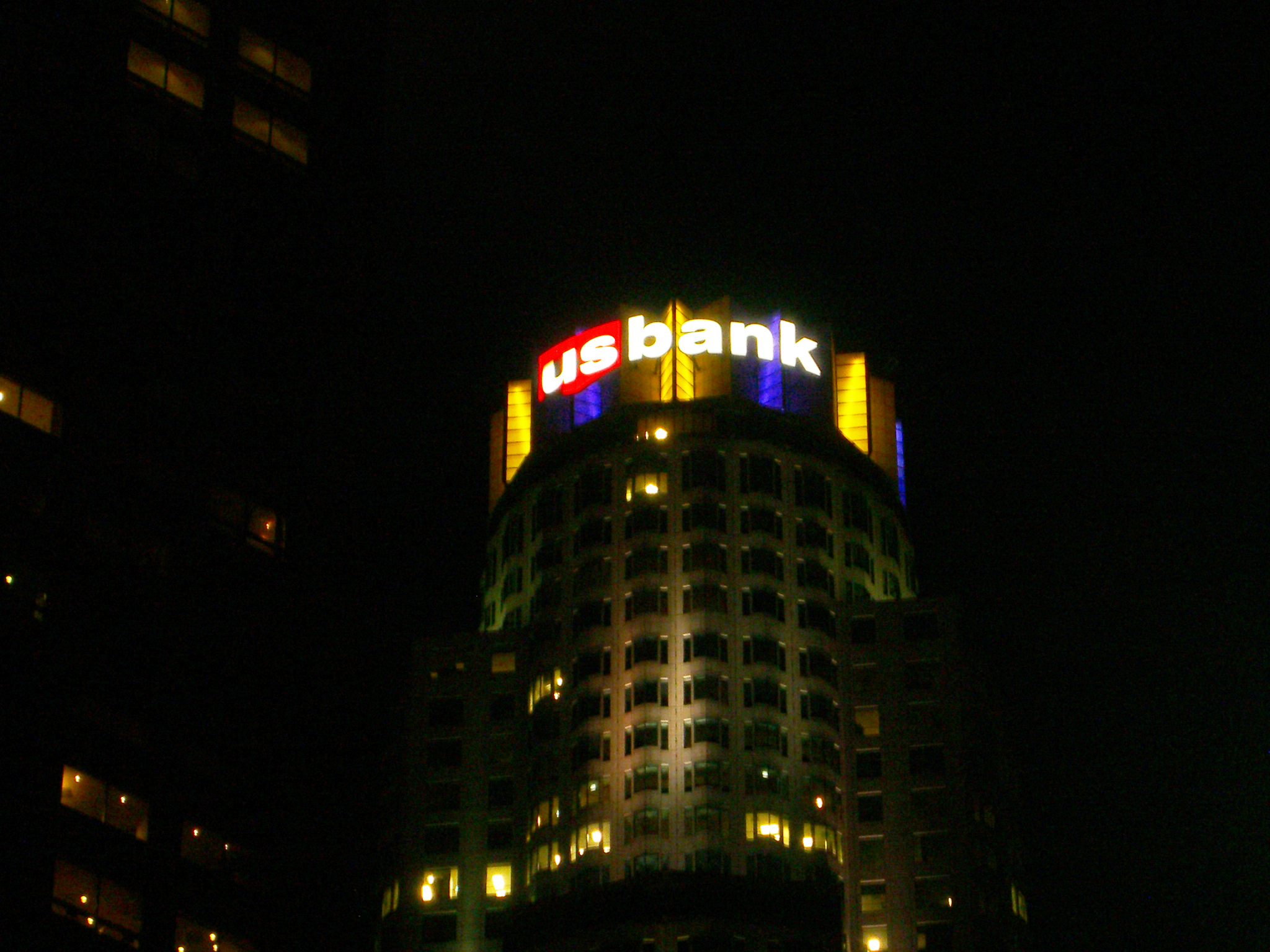
Lit in purple and gold to support the Los Angeles Lakers during the 2009 NBA Finals

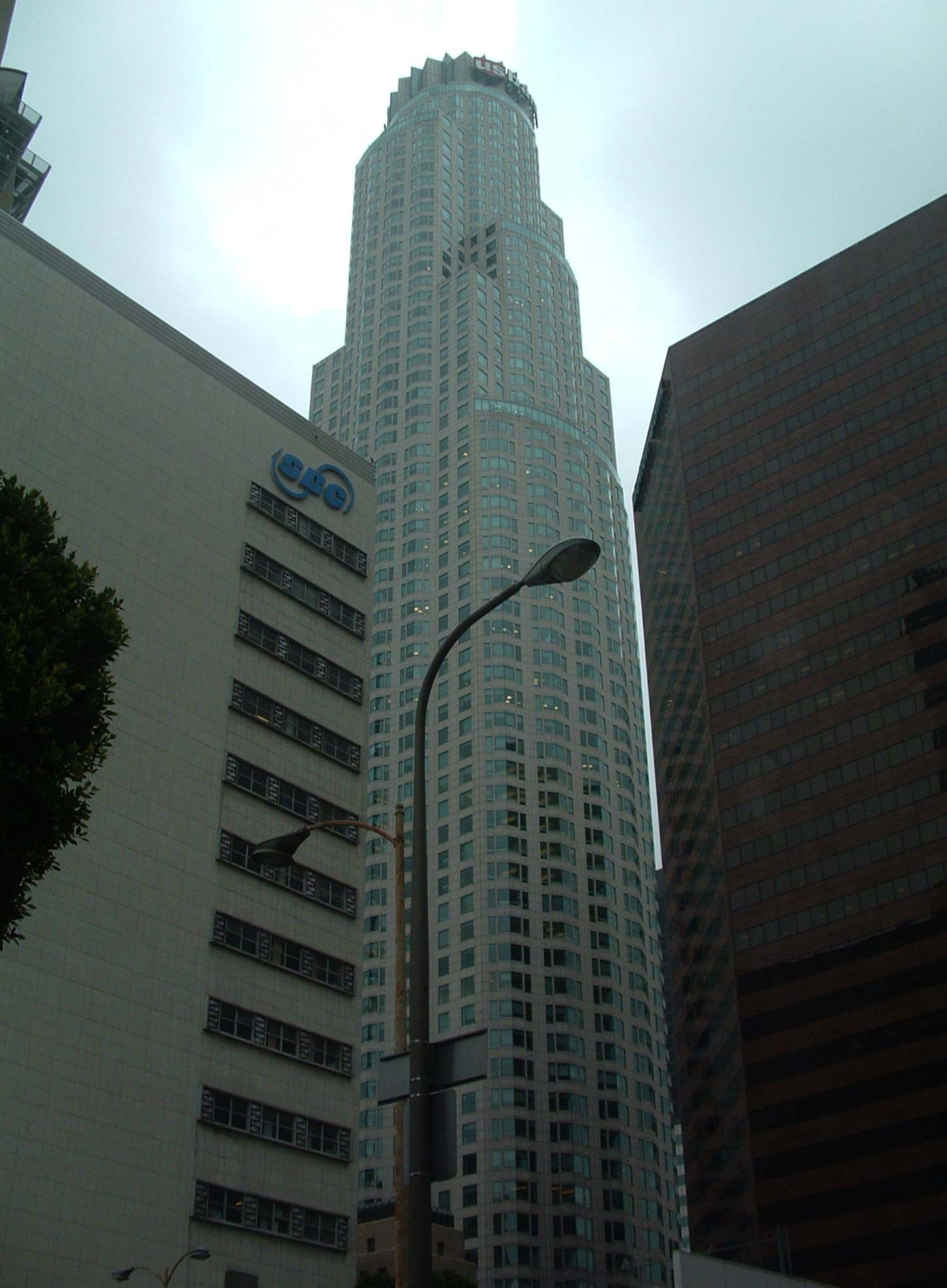
With the AT&T Switching Center to the left and CBRE Tower to the right

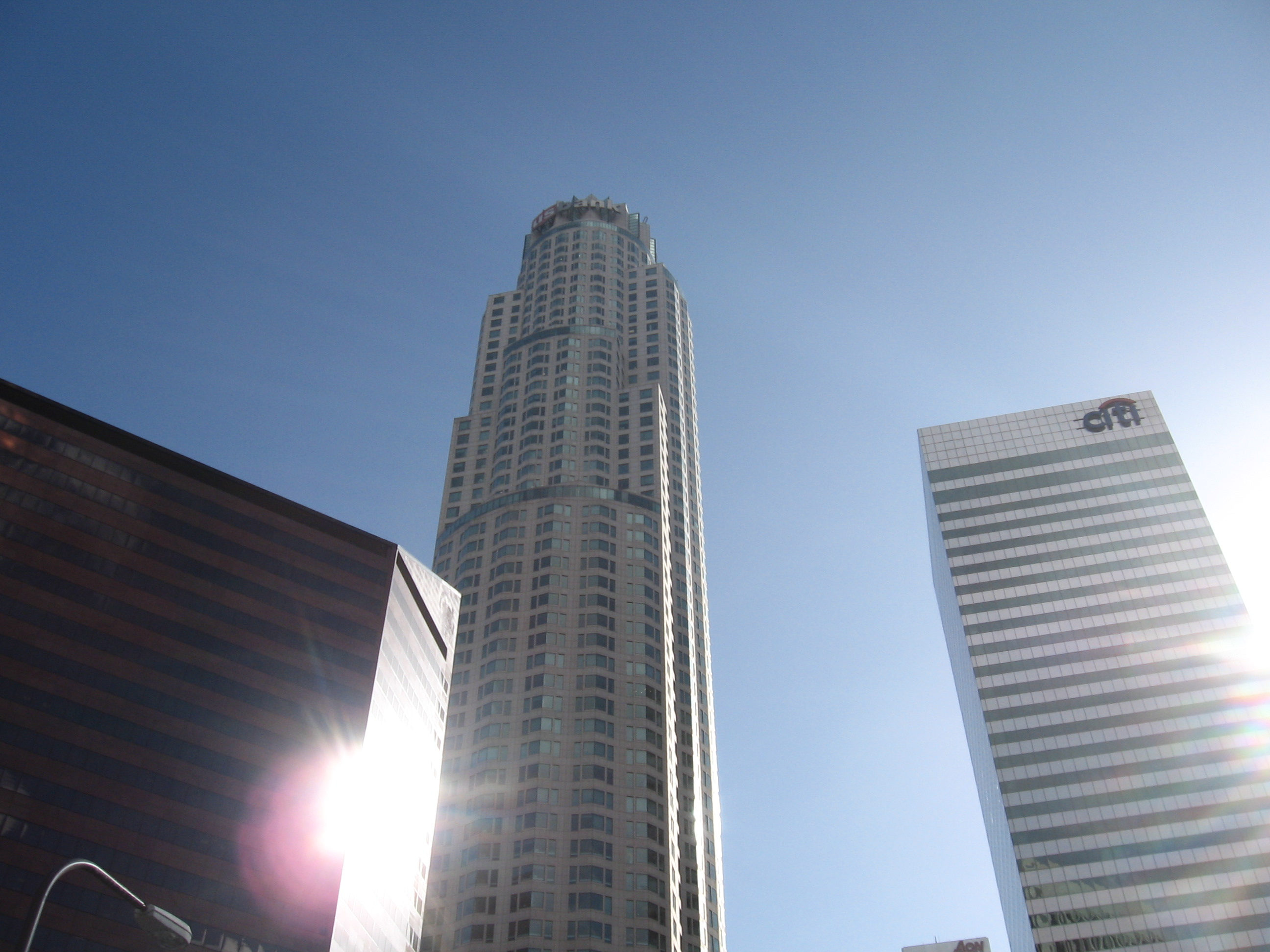
The U.S. Bank Tower is the third-tallest building west of the Mississippi River

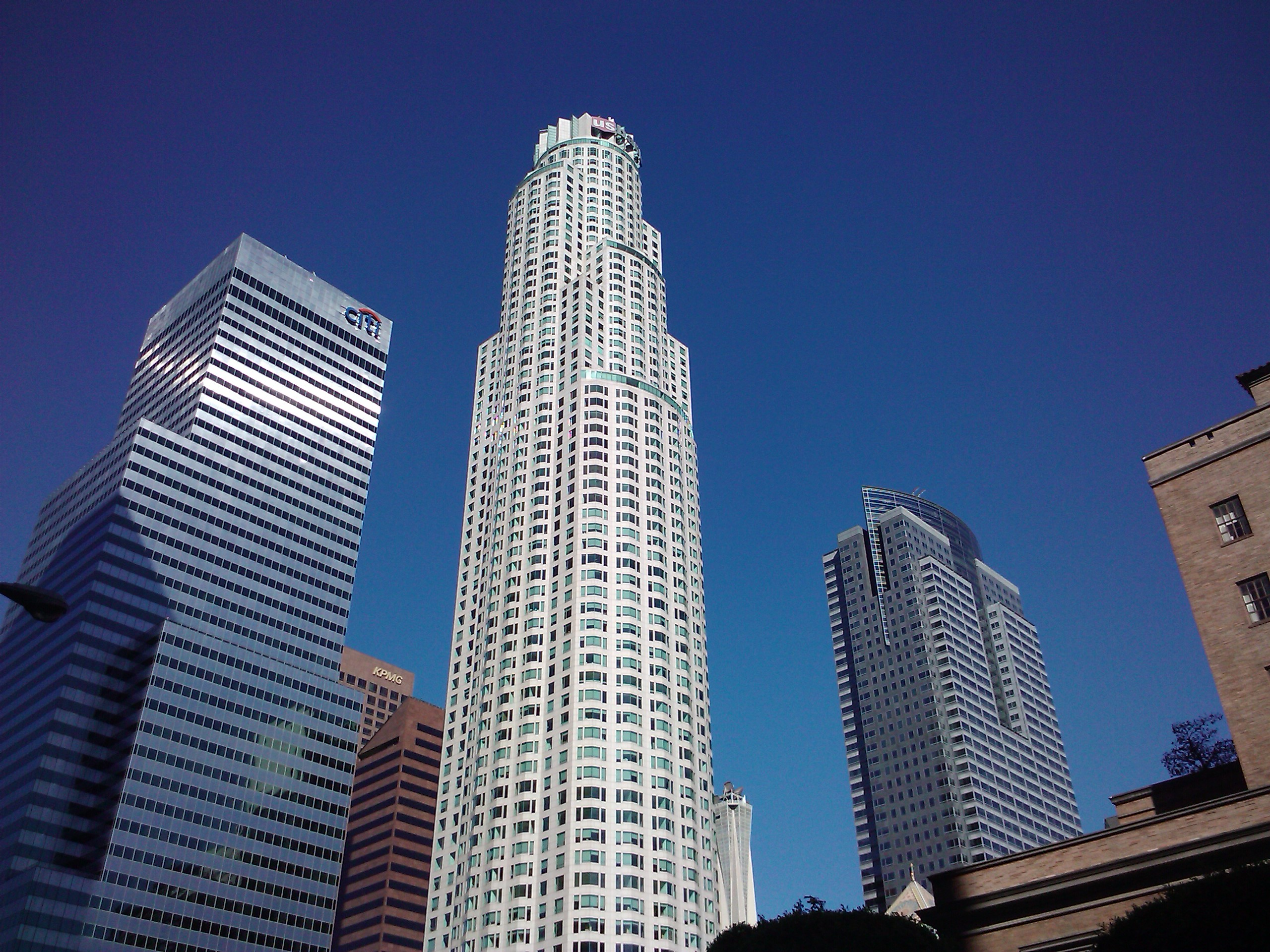
From left to right: the Citibank Center, the U.S. Bank Tower, and the Gas Company Tower

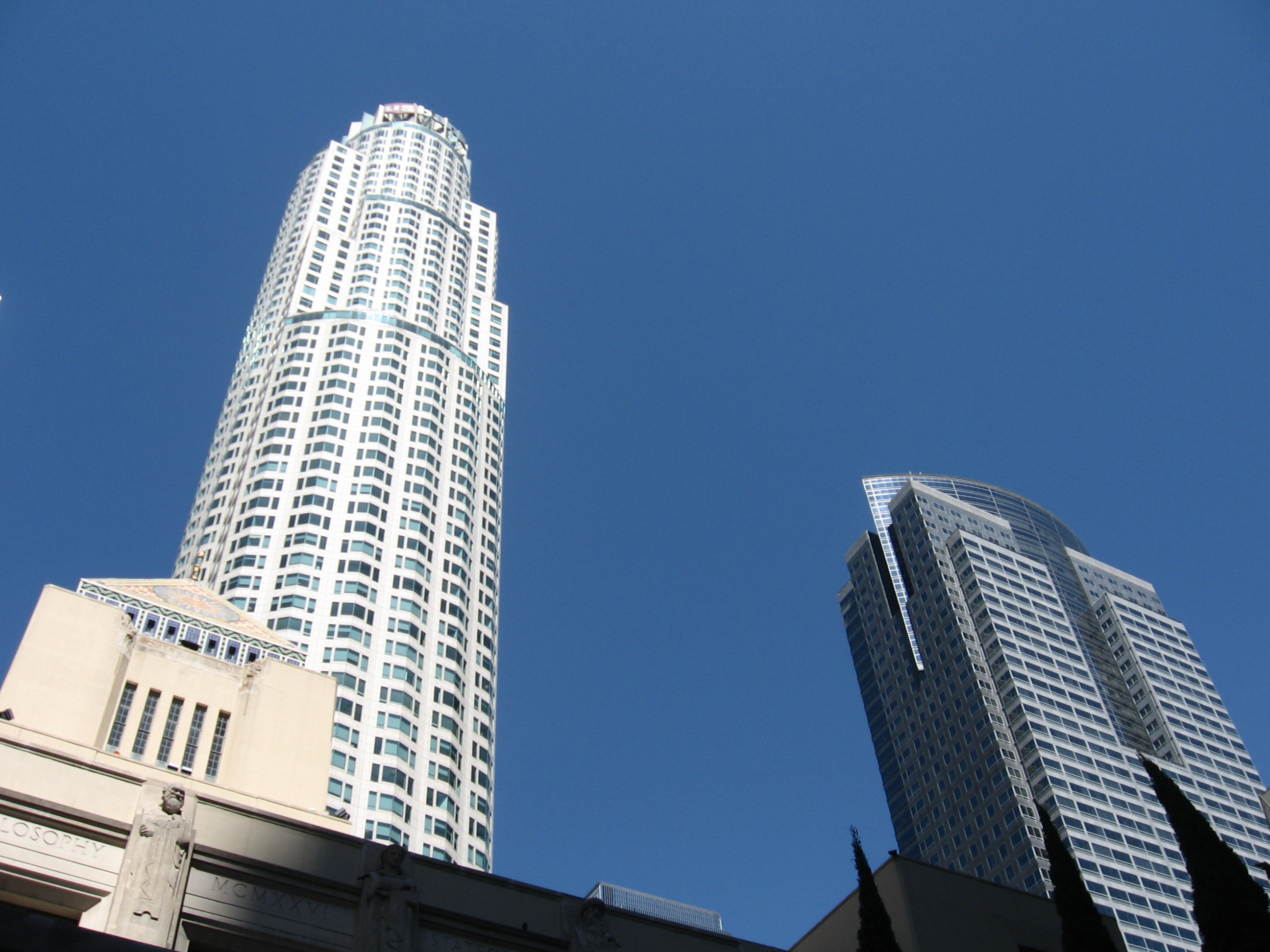
The U.S. Bank Tower towering over Central Library in Downtown Los Angeles

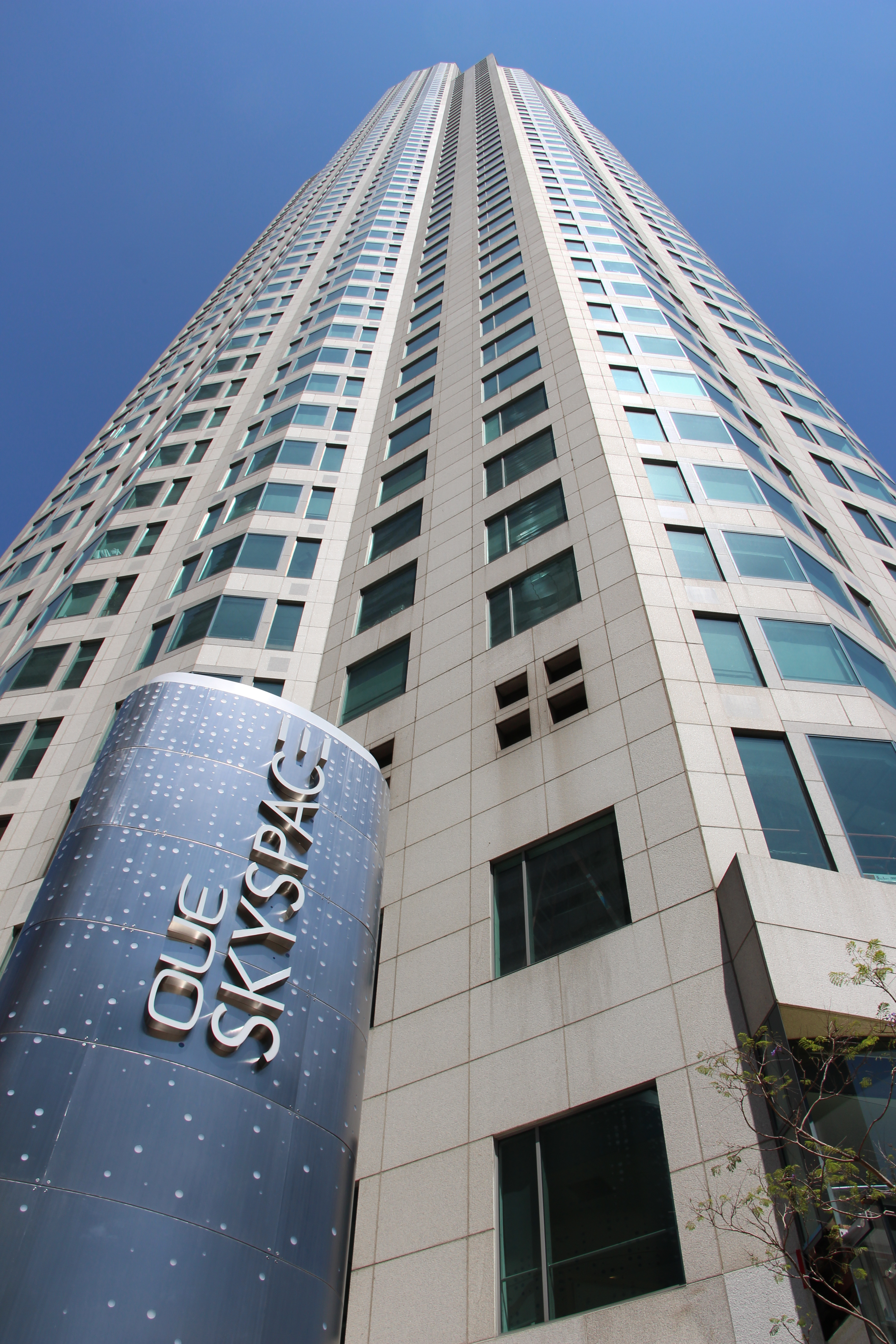
former OUE Skyspace entrance

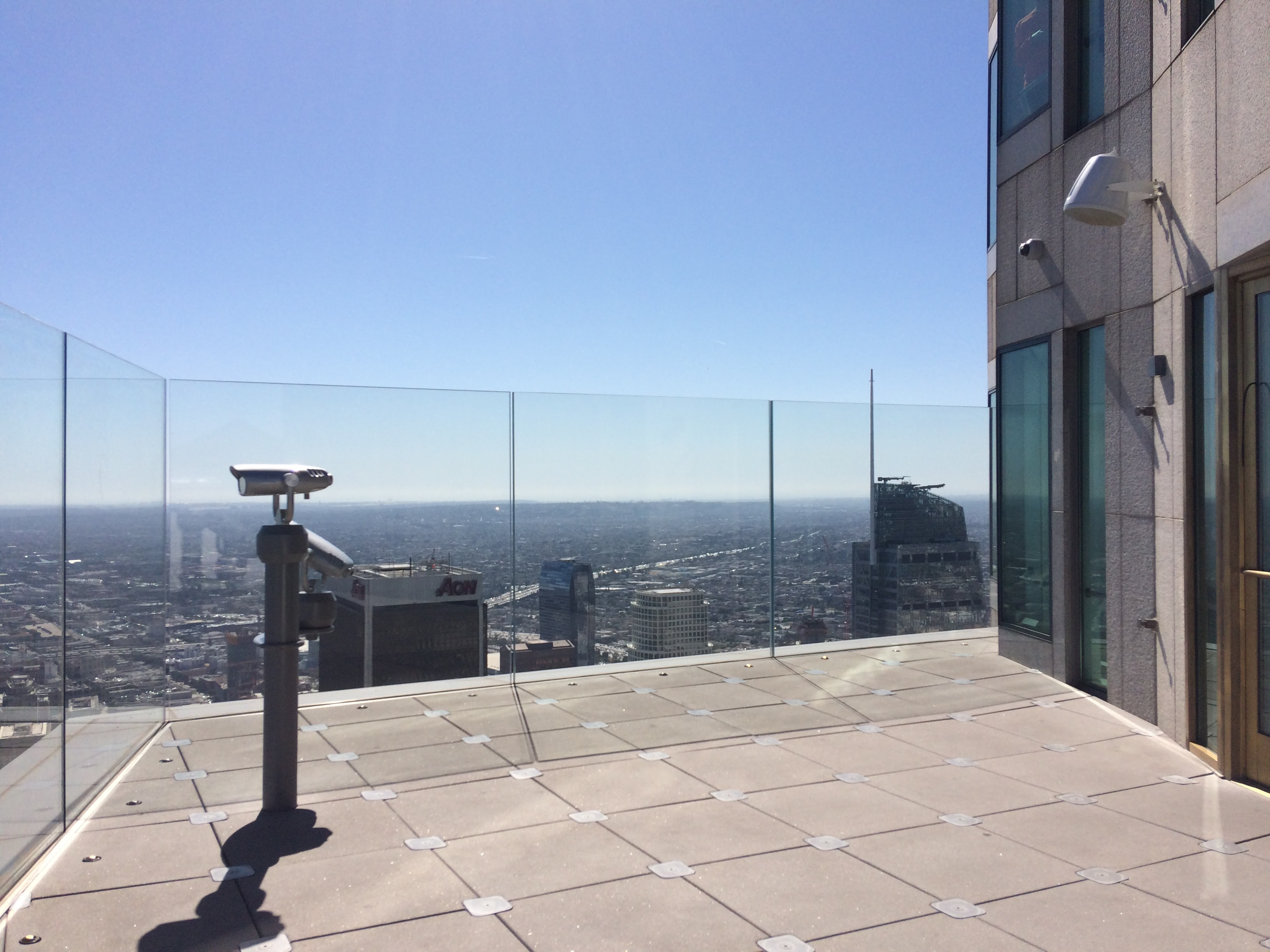
former OUE Skyspace outside terrace

== See also ==
- 50 tallest buildings in the U.S.
- List of tallest buildings in Los Angeles
- List of tallest buildings by U.S. state
- List of tallest freestanding structures in the world
- List of tallest freestanding steel structures

Records
Preceded by JPMorgan Chase Tower	Tallest building in the United States west of Mississippi River; 1989–2017	Succeeded by Wilshire Grand Center
