= The Tower Burbank =

Commercial high-rise building in California

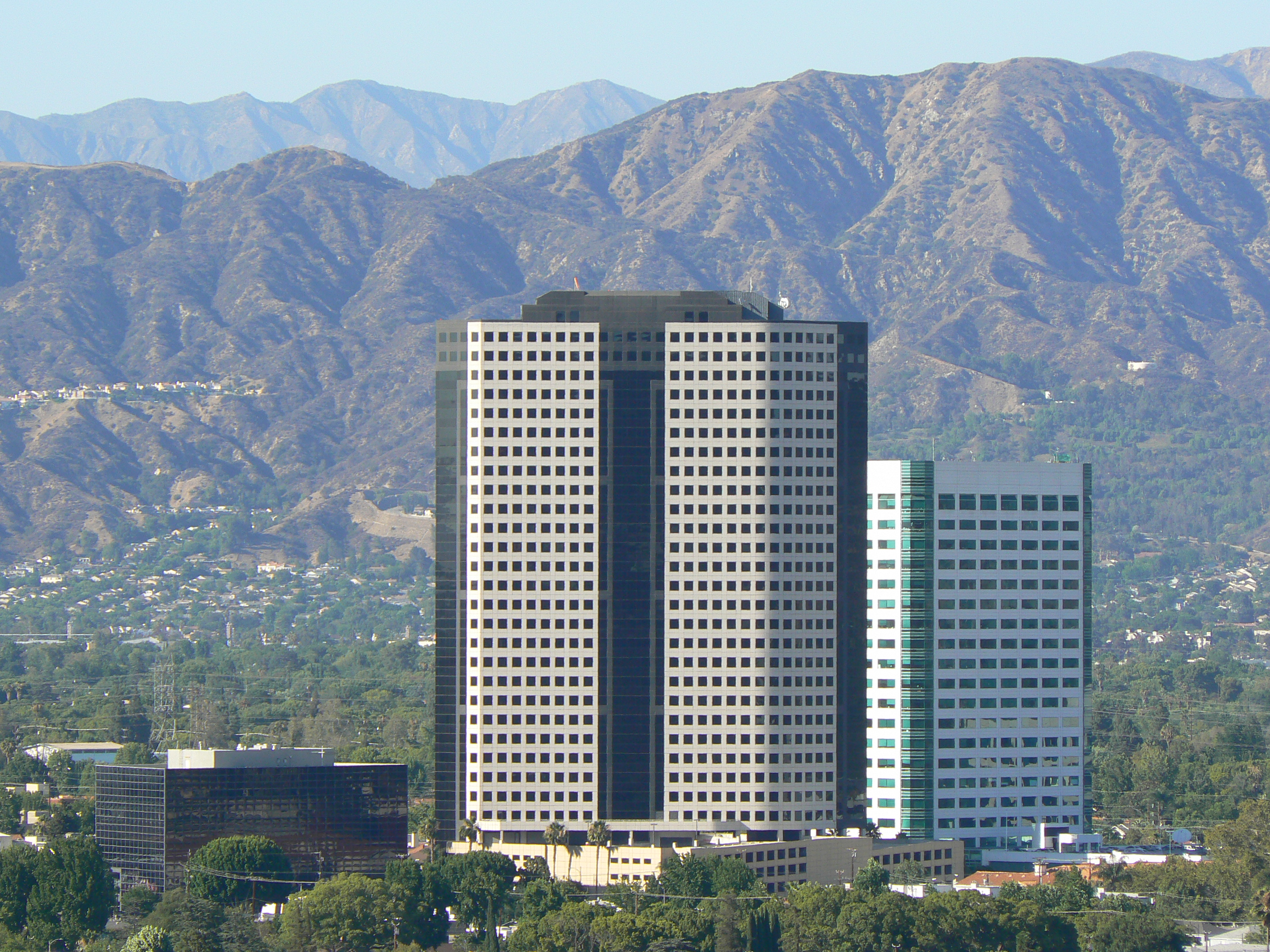
- Interactive map of the The Tower Burbank area
- Former names: The Tower Burbank, Triad Center at Burbank, Geiger Tower

General information
- Location: 3900 West Alameda Avenue Burbank, California
- Coordinates: 34°09′10.6″N 118°20′34.0″W
- Construction started: 1987
- Completed: 1988
- Cost: $85,000,000

Height
- Height: 460 ft (140.2 m)

Technical details
- Floor count: 32
- Floor area: 489,120 sqft

Website
- www.thetowerburbank.com

The Tower Burbank is a commercial high-rise building in Burbank, California. At 460 feet, it is the tallest building in the city and is the 80th tallest building in California. The Tower can be seen from the Ventura Freeway. In 2014, the building was purchased by Worthe Real Estate Group for $109,000,000. The Walt Disney Company was a major tenant until 2013 when they decided to move their offices at The Tower to their other locations in Burbank and Glendale.

== See also ==
- List of tallest buildings in California
