= Three Embarcadero Center =

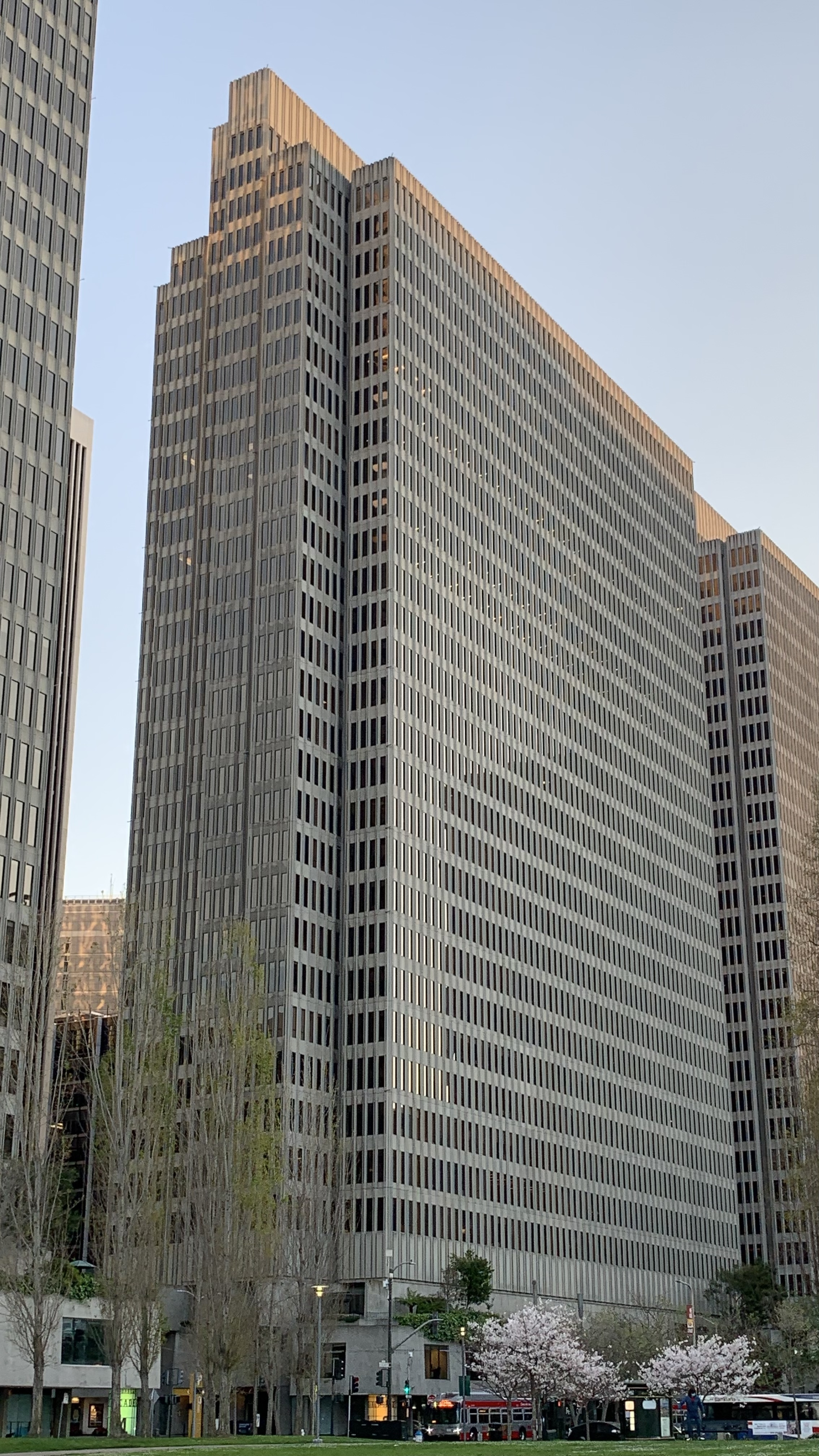
- In April 2021
- Interactive map of the Three Embarcadero Center area

General information
- Status: Completed
- Type: Commercial offices
- Location: 155 Clay Street; San Francisco, California
- Coordinates: 37.795139°N 122.397361°W
- Completed: 1977
- Owner: Embarcadero Center Assoc. Boston Properties
- Management: Boston Properties

Height
- Roof: 126 m (413 ft)

Technical details
- Floor count: 31
- Floor area: 725,000 sq ft (67,400 m^{2})

Design and construction
- Architect: John Portman & Associates
- Developer: Trammell Crow; David Rockefeller; John C. Portman Jr.

Three Embarcadero Center is an office skyscraper located in San Francisco's Financial District. The building is part of the Embarcadero Center, which is a complex of six interconnected buildings and one off-site extension. The skyscraper, completed in 1977, stands 126 m (413 ft) with 31 stories. Three Embarcadero Center stands at the same height as Two Embarcadero Center, although this building has one more floor.

== See also ==
- San Francisco's tallest buildings
