= Glumac =

Glumac is a surname. Notable people with the surname include:

- Mike Glumac (born 1980), Canadian ice hockey player
- Rick Glumac, Canadian software engineer and politician
- Tomislav Glumac (born 1991), Croatian footballer

== See also ==
- Glumač, a village in Serbia
