= Two Embarcadero Center =

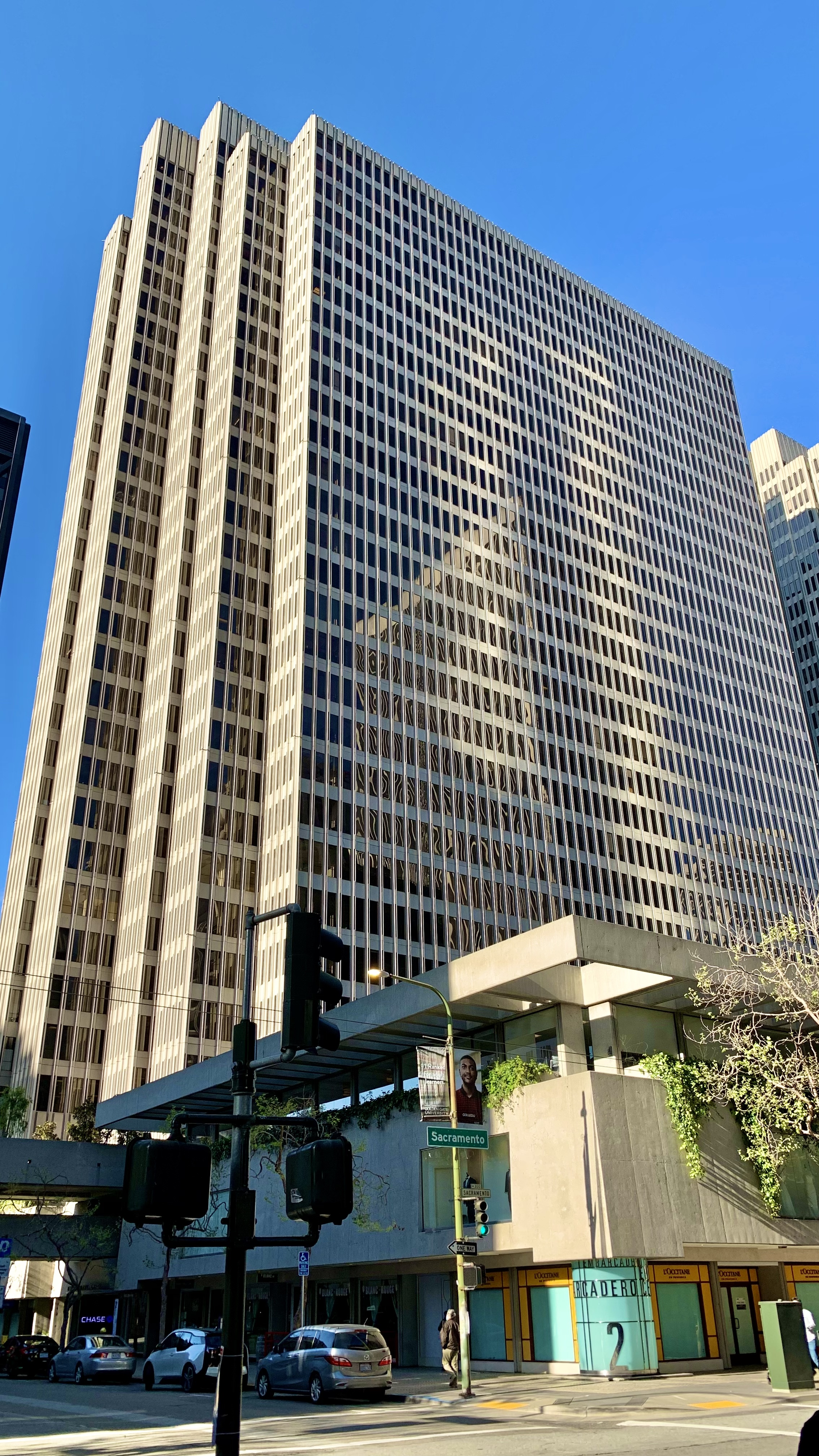
- In April 2021

- Location within San Francisco Two Embarcadero Center (California) Two Embarcadero Center (the United States)

General information
- Type: Commercial offices
- Location: 250 Clay Street; San Francisco, California
- Coordinates: 37.794944°N 122.398472°W
- Completed: 1974
- Owner: Embarcadero Center Assoc. Boston Properties
- Management: Boston Properties

Height
- Roof: 126.00 m (413.39 ft)

Technical details
- Floor count: 30
- Floor area: 725,000 sq ft (67,400 m^{2})

Design and construction
- Architect: John Portman & Associates
- Developer: Trammell Crow; David Rockefeller; John C. Portman Jr.

Two Embarcadero Center is an office skyscraper located off The Embarcadero in the financial district of San Francisco, California. The 126 m (413 ft), 30-story tower, completed in 1974 is part of the Embarcadero Center, a complex of seven towers, of which two are hotels. Twin-tower Three Embarcadero Center is the same height, but has one additional floor.

== Tenants ==
- One Medical Group
- Macquarie Group

Former tenants include the business offices of the Iranian Consulate San Francisco, from January 27, 1972 until April 8, 1980. Floor 8 is a flexible coworking space

== See also ==
- San Francisco's tallest buildings
