= 425 Market Street =

Skyscraper in San Francisco

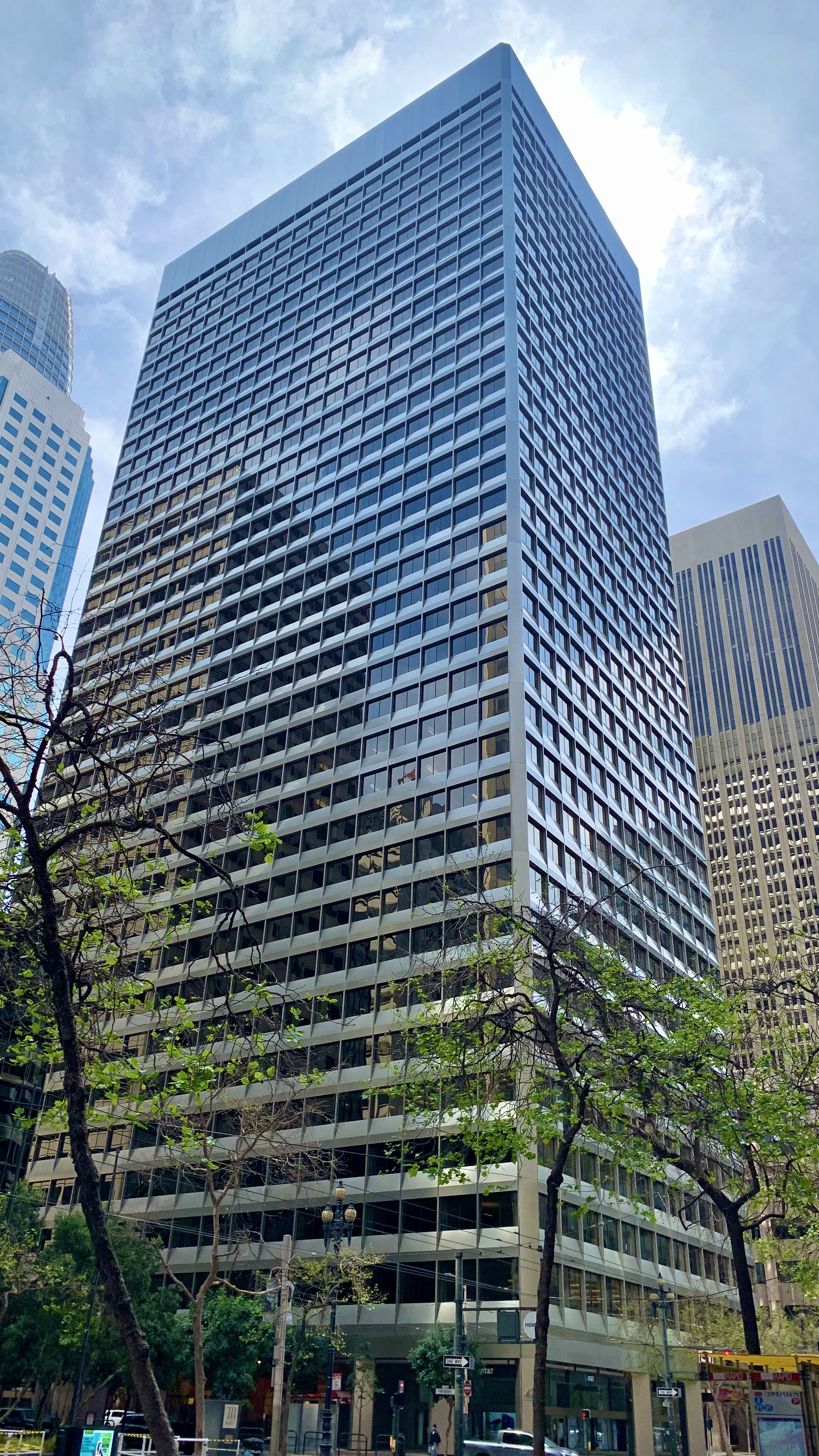
- In 2021

- Location within San Francisco 425 Market Street (California)
- Alternative names: 1 Metropolitan Life Plaza; 1 Metro Plaza

General information
- Type: Commercial offices
- Location: 425 Market Street; San Francisco, California
- Coordinates: 37.7911°N 122.3981°W
- Completed: 1973
- Management: Cushman & Wakefield

Height
- Roof: 160 m (520 ft)

Technical details
- Floor count: 38
- Floor area: 905,000 sq ft (84,100 m^{2})
- Lifts/elevators: 21

Design and construction
- Architect: Skidmore, Owings & Merrill

425 Market Street is an office skyscraper located on the corner of Market and Fremont Streets in the financial district of San Francisco, California. The 160 m (520 ft), 38 floor office tower was completed in 1973. It was built by the Metropolitan Life Insurance Company as their "Pacific Coast Headquarters" and was called "1 Metropolitan Plaza". It was built as a modern replacement for their older headquarters on Nob Hill at 600 Stockton Street (now remodeled as the Ritz-Carlton Hotel). It was among the first buildings in San Francisco to have a high-speed transport system (a glorified dumb waiter) for computer data cards, files and inner-office mail, at the time a state-of-the-art system.

Its largest tenant today is law firm Morrison & Foerster LLP. The building is partially owned by the Government Pension Fund of Norway, who according to their 2015 report owns 47.5%.

== See also ==
- San Francisco's tallest buildings
