= Vaillancourt Fountain =

Fountain in San Francisco, California, U.S.

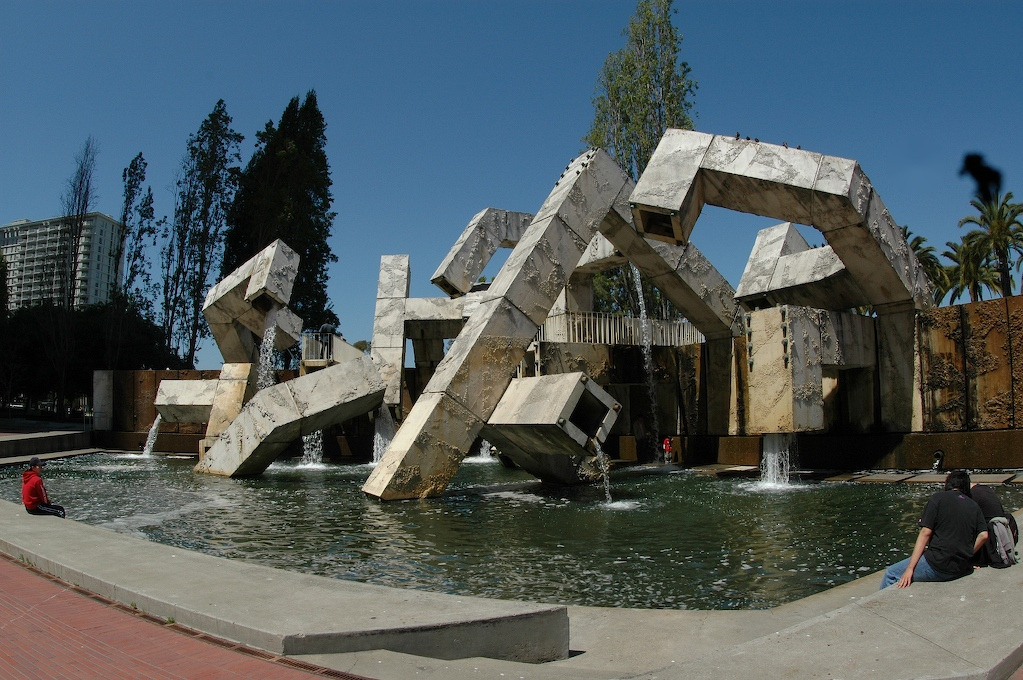
- Artist: Armand Vaillancourt
- Year: 1971
- Completion date: April 21, 1971
- Type: Precast concrete
- Dimensions: 12 m (40 ft)
- Weight: 700 tons
- Location: Embarcadero Plaza; San Francisco, California, United States; 37.7954°N 122.3953°W
- Owner: San Francisco Arts Commission
- Accession: 1971.46
- Website: embarcaderoplaza.com/tour/vaillancourt-fountain

Vaillancourt Fountain, sometimes called Québec libre!, is a large fountain currently undergoing disassembly and removal at the Embarcadero Plaza in San Francisco. It was designed by the Québécois artist Armand Vaillancourt in collaboration with the plaza's landscape architect, Lawrence Halprin, and completed in 1971.

The fountain is constructed out of precast concrete square tubes. When fully installed, the fountain was about 40 feet (12 m) high. Long considered controversial because of its stark, modernist appearance, the fountain was the subject of several unsuccessful proposals to demolish it over the years.

In October 2025, San Francisco determined the fountain to be a historic resource eligible for the California Register of Historical Resources. In November 2025, the San Francisco Arts Commission voted to approve an emergency disassembly and removal recommended by the San Francisco Recreation & Parks Department, citing concerns about structural deterioration. Removal of the piece began in April 2026. Removal and storage for up to three years is estimated to cost $4.4 million.

== Location ==
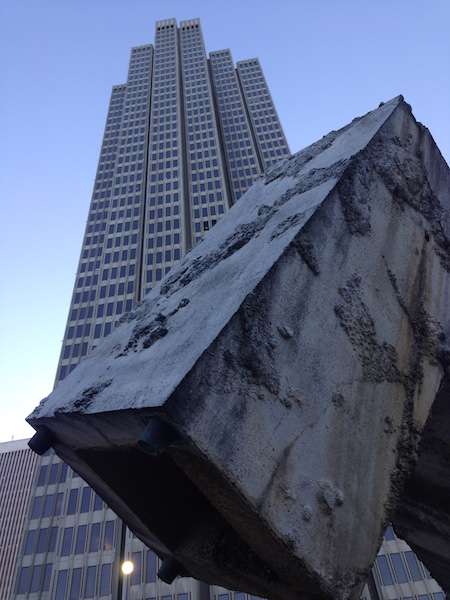
Vaillancourt Fountain, Embarcadero Plaza

The fountain occupied a highly visible spot on the downtown San Francisco waterfront, in Embarcadero Plaza (formerly Justin Herman Plaza), where Market Street meets The Embarcadero. The Hyatt Regency Hotel is at the edge of the plaza, adjacent to the other four highrise towers of the Embarcadero Center. Across The Embarcadero is the Ferry Building, and the eastern end of the California Street cable car line is on the other side of the Hyatt Regency Hotel.

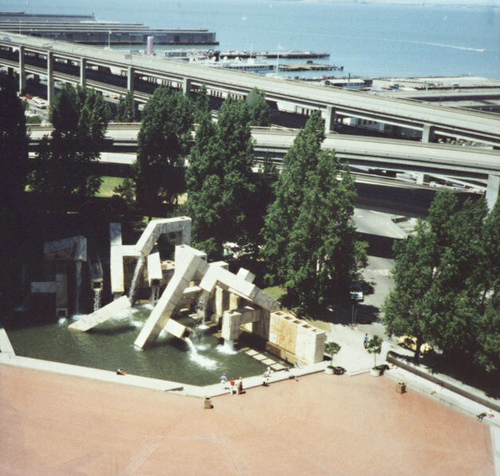
Vaillancourt Fountain and the Embarcadero Freeway in 1988

When Vaillancourt designed the fountain, the elevated Embarcadero Freeway still ran along the Embarcadero. While the fountain was designed with that freeway environment in mind, its main purpose was to bring people to an expansive public space. San Francisco Chronicle architecture critic John King called it "an act of defiant distraction until the freeway came down in 1991".

== Design and construction ==
Vaillancourt Fountain was a product of the redevelopment of San Francisco that took place in the 1950s and 1960s. The Transamerica Pyramid was constructed from 1969-1972. BART was also being constructed; Embarcadero station would eventually open in 1976, three years after the other stations along Market.

Justin Herman, for whom the plaza was formerly named, was a leading figure in this process and the executive director of the redevelopment agency in charge. The plaza was one of several plazas proposed in the 1962 redevelopment analysis What to do About Market Street, including Hallidie Plaza and United Nations Plaza, which were also completed in the mid-1970s. That 1962 analysis was written by planners Livingston and Blayney, landscape architect Lawrence Halprin, architects Rockrise & Watson, and Larry Smith Co. real estate consultants.

Plans for the plaza were drawn up by Mario Ciampi, John Savage Bolles, and Halprin. In August 1966 a committee consisting of those three, plus sculptor and Art Commission member Sally Hellyer, invited six sculptors to submit models for a loosely defined "monumental abstract sculpture". By December five had responded: Jacques Overhoff, Reuben Nakian, Alicia Penalba, James Melchert, and Vaillancourt. The committee chose 38-year-old Vaillancourt but his second model, meant to show development of the design, did not even resemble the first model. By November 1968 Hellyer had been replaced by Ruth Asawa, who rejected the design, saying in part, "I for one, am not willing to remain silent while we play the old game of the emperor's new clothes on the unsuspecting people of this city." For his part, Halprin was quoted as saying that if the fountain didn't prove to be among the "great works of civic art ... I am going to slit my throat".

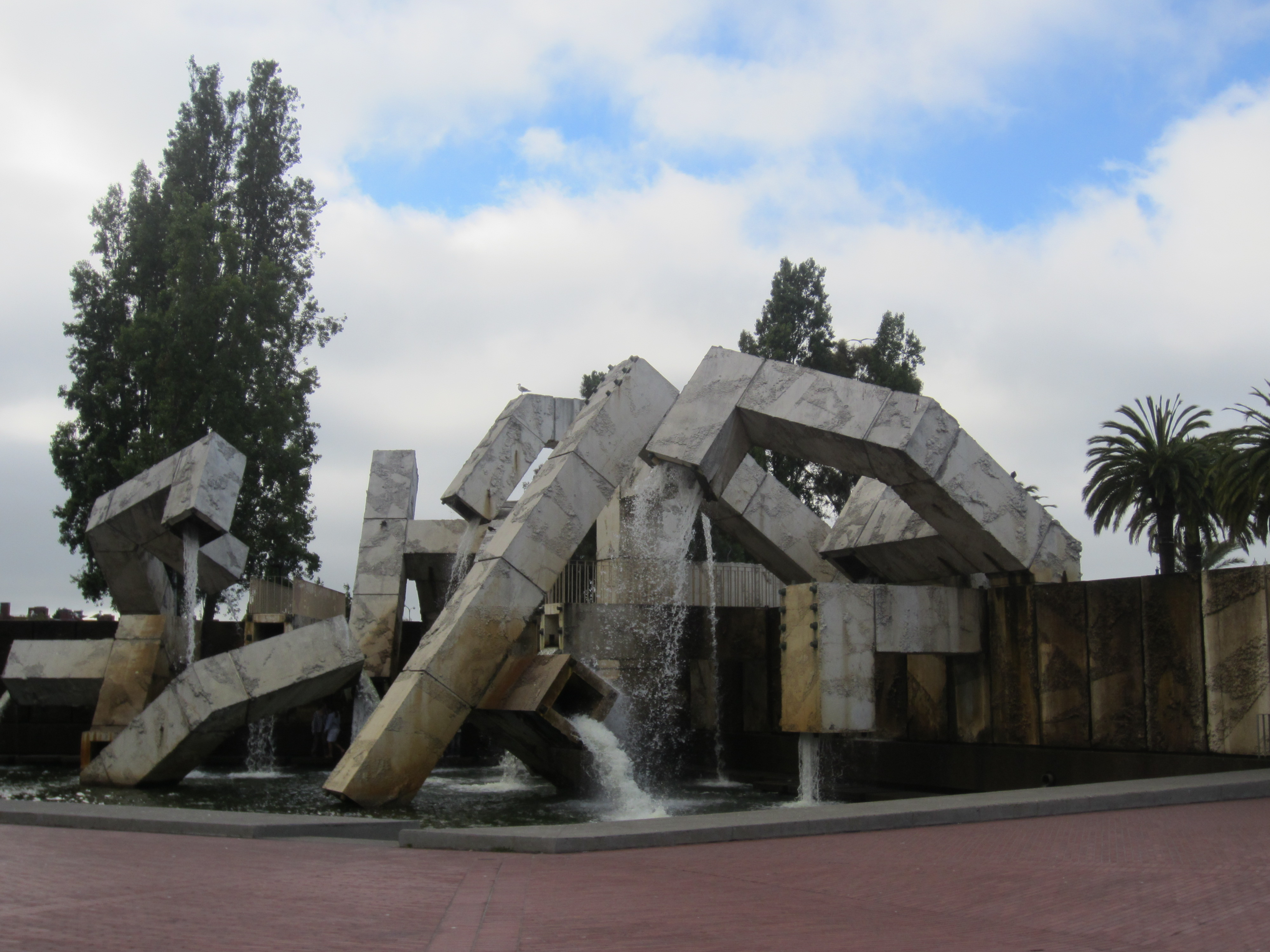
Vaillancourt Fountain in 2013.

The fountain was about 40 feet (12 m) high, weighed approximately 700 short tons (640 t), and was constructed out of precast concrete square tubes. The fountain was positioned in a pool shaped like an irregular pentagon, and was designed to pump up to 30,000 US gallons (110,000 L) of water per minute.

The fountain looked unfinished, like concrete that had not been completely mixed. Up close, it was very rough and textured. There were several square pillars or cubed tubes that formed a semi circle inside the pool. The natural colored pillars jutted out and crisscrossed from the corner of the plaza "like the tentacles of some immense geometrical octopus. ... breaking open." There were two bridges, or walkways with stairs, that allowed the public to stand between the tubes and have a view overlooking the plaza and city. A series of platforms at pool level permitted pedestrian entry into the fountain and behind the falling water. The fountain and plaza were accessible to the public at all times and in all weather conditions. The fountain's budget was US $310,000. It was dedicated on April 22, 1971. The Los Angeles Times reported that its cost was US $607,800.

== History ==
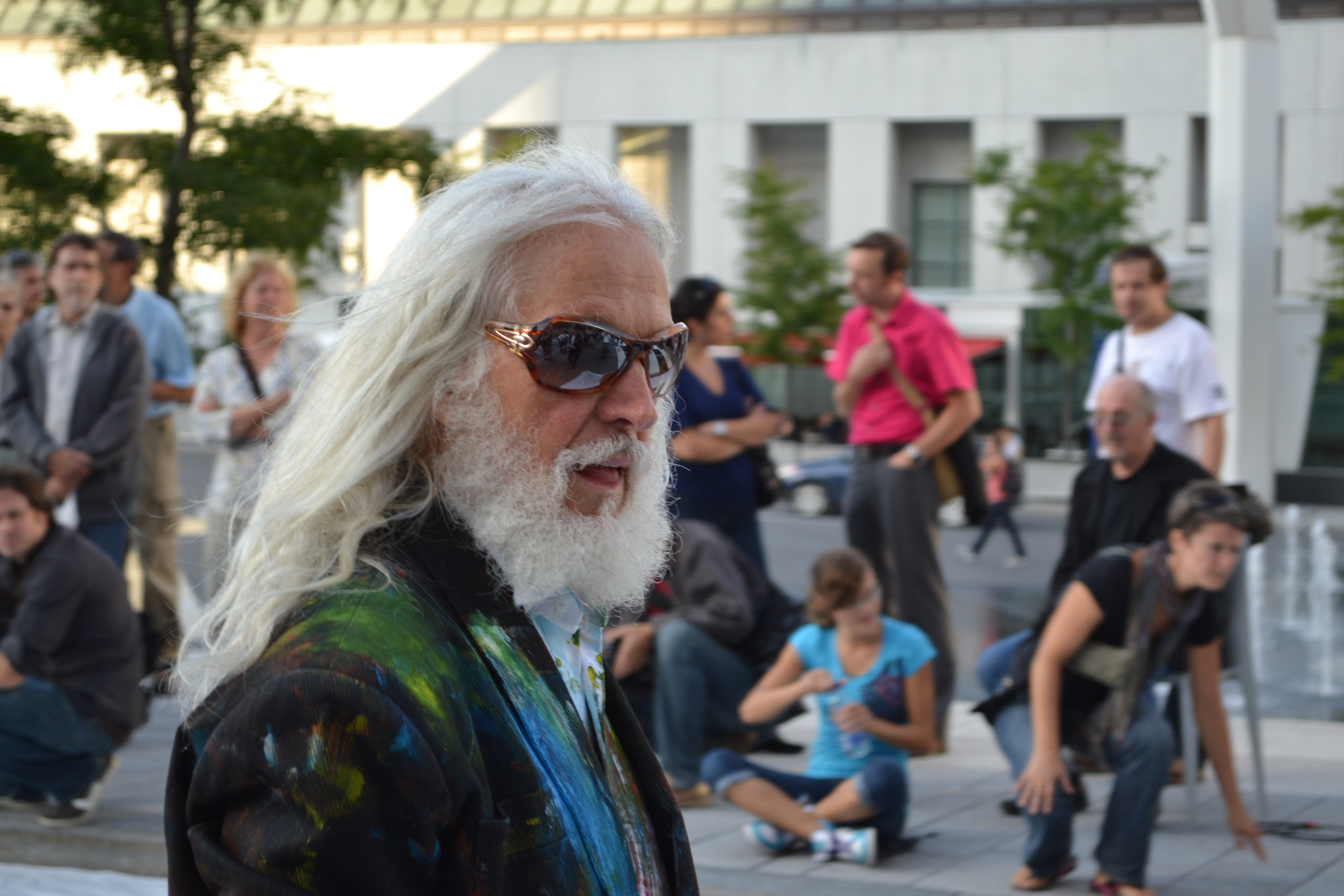
Armand Vaillancourt in 2011

Just before the dedication, the slogan "Quebec Libre" (a reference to the Quebec sovereignty movement) was painted on the fountain at night, and the graffiti was erased. During the dedication, attended by Thomas Hoving, director of New York's Metropolitan Museum of Art, a rock band played, and Armand Vaillancourt himself painted "Quebec Libre" on the fountain in as many places as he could reach. A redevelopment agency employee started to paint over the slogans during the ceremony, but Herman stopped him, saying it could be done later. When asked about why he defaced his own fountain with graffiti he responded, "No, no. It's a joy to make a free statement. This fountain is dedicated to all freedom. Free Quebec! Free East Pakistan! Free Viet Nam! Free the whole world!" Vaillancourt said his actions were "a powerful performance" intended to illustrate the notion of power to the people. "Quebec Libre" has been an alternate name for the fountain since.

Flamin' Groovies performed there, on the 19th September, 1979, and the concert was broadcast on KSAN (FM).

=== 1987 U2 concert ===
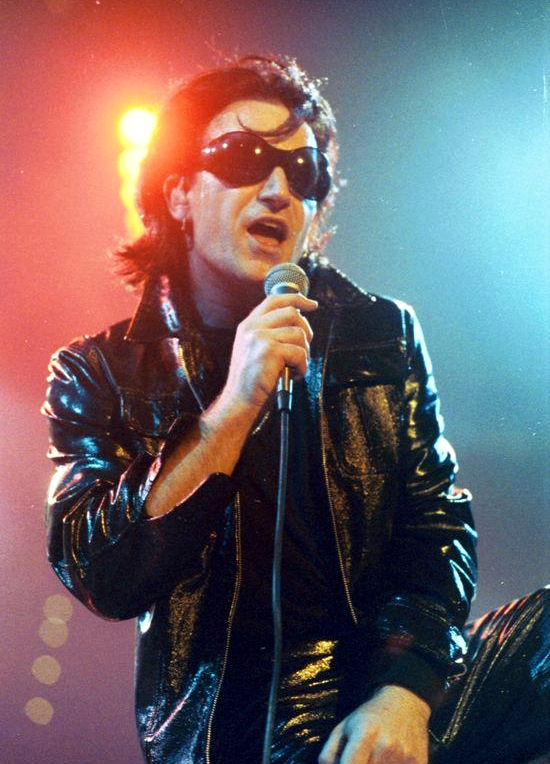
U2 lead singer Bono

On the first leg of The Joshua Tree Tour by the rock band U2 in 1987, they performed concerts at the Cow Palace just south of San Francisco on April 24 and April 25, 1987. On the third leg of the tour, concerts had been announced for November 14 and 15, 1987, across the San Francisco Bay, at the Oakland Coliseum.

On the morning of November 11, 1987, local radio stations announced that U2 would hold a free-admission concert that day in Embarcadero Plaza, with the stage set up in front of the fountain. Within a few hours, a crowd estimated at 20,000 people gathered in the plaza. The concert was jokingly called "Save the Yuppies", in reference to the 1987 stock market crash that had taken place three weeks earlier.

The band closed their nine-song performance with their hit "Pride (In the Name of Love)". During the instrumental portion in the middle of the song, Bono, lead singer of the band, climbed onto the sculpture and spray painted graffiti on it, reading "Rock N Roll Stops The Traffic". Mayor Dianne Feinstein, who had been waging a citywide campaign against graffiti that had resulted in over 300 citations during the year, was angry and criticized Bono for defacing a San Francisco landmark. She said, "I am disappointed that a rock star who is supposed to be a role model for young people chose to vandalize the work of another artist. The unfortunate incident marred an otherwise wonderful rock concert." Bono was issued a citation for misdemeanor malicious mischief. U2 manager Paul McGuinness said, "This is clearly not an act of vandalism. This act was clearly in the spirit of the artwork itself." The numerous callers to Ronn Owens' radio talk show on KGO-AM were evenly split, with younger listeners defending the singer's action and older ones not. Bono soon apologized, saying "I really do regret it. It was dumb." The singer explained that he thought that he was honoring the artist's work and that the artist had agreed, but later Bono realized that the city owned the fountain. The group covered the cost of removal of the graffiti.

Armand Vaillancourt flew from Quebec to California after the incident, and spoke in favor of Bono's actions at U2's Oakland performance several days later. Vaillancourt said, "Good for him. I want to shake his hand. People get excited about such a little thing." The sculptor spray-painted a slogan of his own on the band's stage, "Stop the Madness".

The episode received further attention when it was featured in U2's 1988 documentary film Rattle and Hum. There, footage of it was shown over, and interspersed with, the band's opening number, "All Along the Watchtower", a song by Bob Dylan that had been a big hit for Jimi Hendrix. This has led some people to misidentify the song being played when the spray painting occurred. The fountain and plaza are listed on one U2 fan site's list of recommended group-related places in the U.S. to visit.

=== Water feature ===
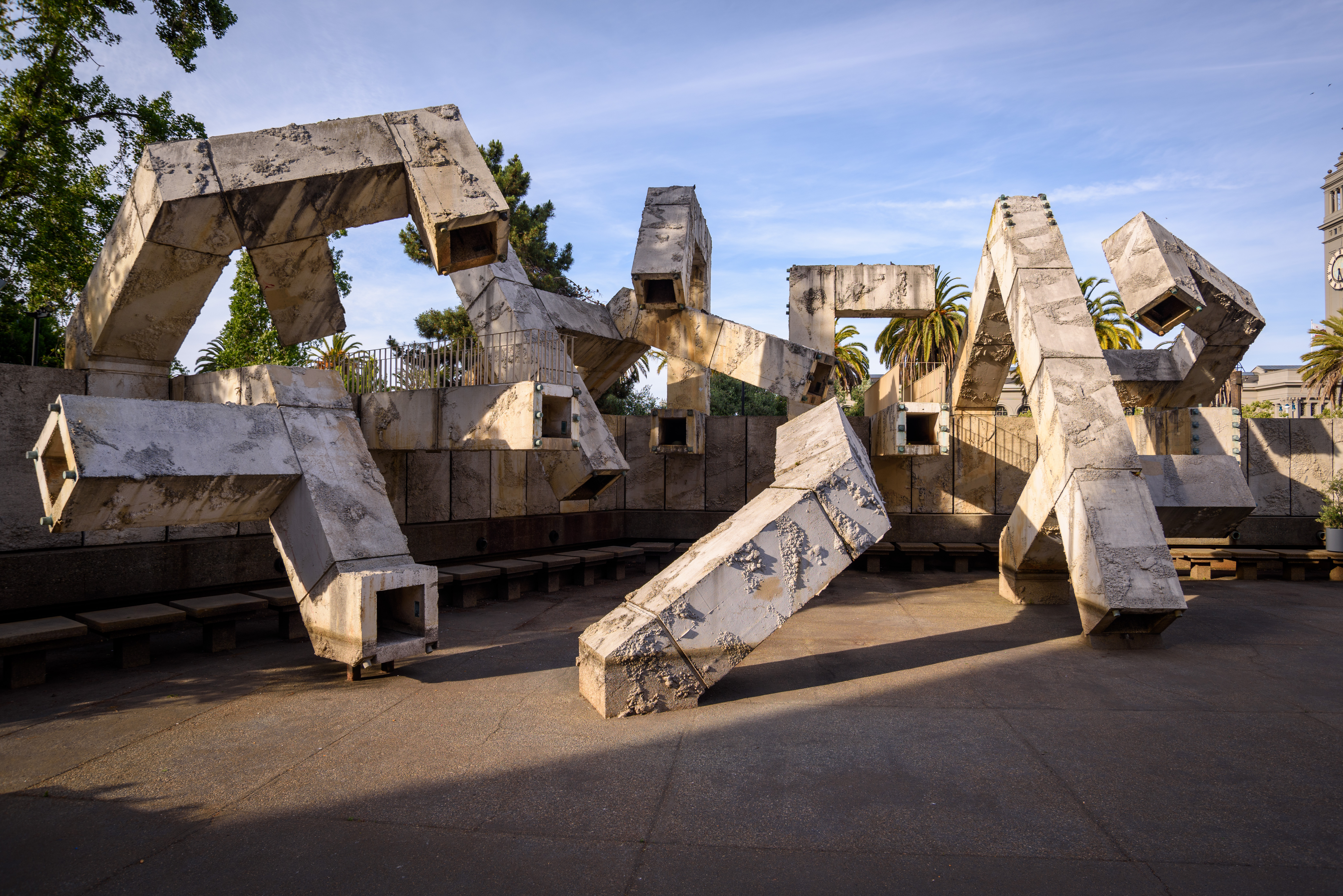
The fountain, completely drained of water in May 2025

At the fountain's opening in 1971, both the water flow and human participation were considered integral to the work. Alfred Frankenstein, writing for the San Francisco Chronicle, noted "the heart of the idea is the unique one of public entry into and intimate exploration of the fountain's innards; in this it is unique and decidedly a success. It is not a great work of sculpture, which is like observing that an automobile is not much of a success as a horse."

The water was turned off at the fountain from 2001 until 2004, reopening on August 2, 2004. San Francisco estimated the cost of electricity was approximately US $200,000 per year to operate the fountain. Peskin negotiated a public-private partnership where the city would pay for the operating costs (at a revised estimate of US $76,000 per year) and Boston Properties would pay for maintenance (estimated at US $20,000 per year). The fountain was shut off again during the winter of 2007–08 starting in November 2007 so that skaters at the Embarcadero Plaza ice rink would not be splashed. It reopened on January 21, 2008.

In reaction to the 2011–17 California drought, all of San Francisco's public fountains were shut off in order to conserve water. Vaillancourt Fountain was turned off in 2014 for the drought, but after that drought ended, the Recreation and Park department cited lack of funds to make repairs to the fountain as the reason it had not been reactivated. The estimated cost of rehabilitation to allow water to flow again was approximately US $500,000.

Charles Desmarais, an art critic with the San Francisco Chronicle, echoed Frankenstein's comments from 1971, calling for the water to return in an August 2017 opinion article:

[T]he water is as essential to [Vaillancourt Fountain] as it was superfluous to [the nearby Mechanics Monument]. Vaillancourt is a sprawling, lifeless skeleton in its current dry state, with a chain-link fence blocking the two sets of stairs that once allowed people to peer down into the roiling maelstrom below. The chain of island-like steppingstones that made visitors feel they were walking on water is now a gantlet of precarious pedestals several feet above a rock-hard floor. The site is littered with trash. ...
It makes little sense to spend money to add even a single new object to our civic art collection if we allow the virtual eradication, through neglect and obliviousness to its original intention, of our city's most visible public work. We are the heirs to a memorial that, encountered as it was designed to be, animates a moment in art and history that cannot be re-created. If our city agencies can understand that, their priorities should be as clear as the waters of a healthy Vaillancourt Fountain.

— Charles Desmarais, "Vaillancourt Fountain deserves respect — and water" August 5, 2017

On August 15, 2017, water was restored to the fountain as a test run, with the intention that it stay on until November, when the ice rink would reopen. The water was dyed with the 'Blue Lagoon' aquatic dye to control the growth of algae and bacteria. The nontoxic aquatic dye attenuated the penetration of light into the water, and tinted the water blue. The pumps failed in June 2024, leaving the fountain dry with an estimated US $3 million replacement cost.

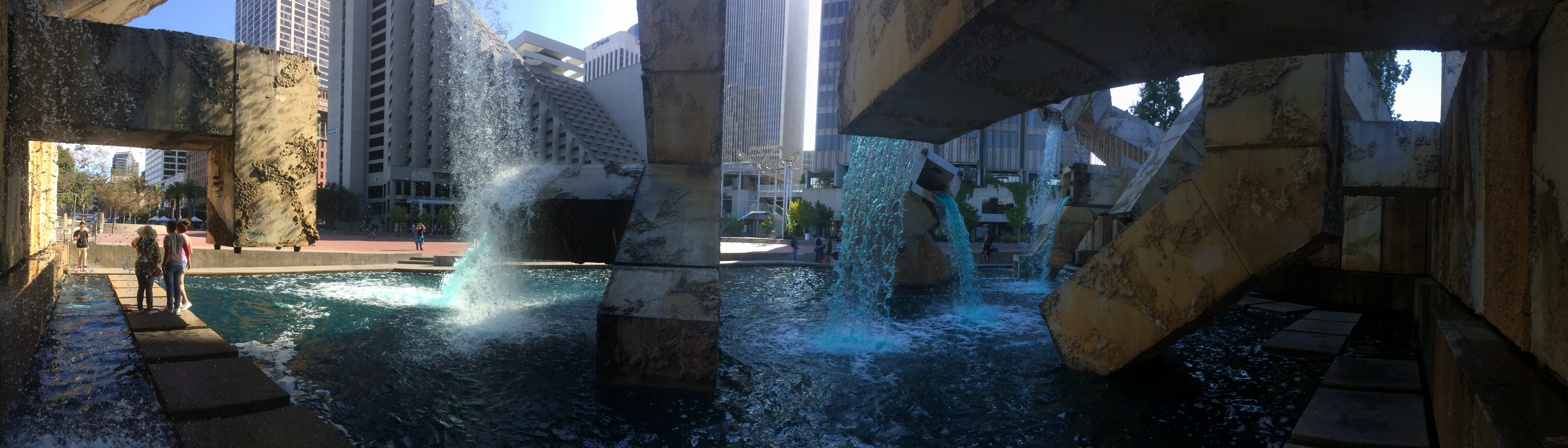
Vaillancourt Fountain from inside in 2017, with water running again

=== Demolition proposals ===
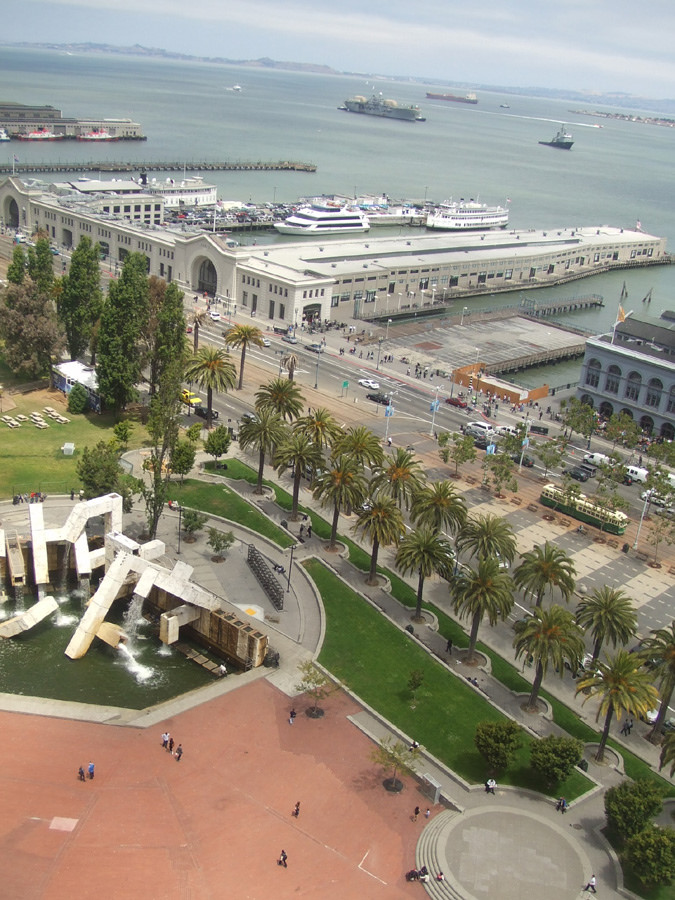
View of Embarcadero Plaza, Vaillancourt Fountain, and The Embarcadero in 2010 following the demolition of the Embarcadero Freeway in the early 1990s

Following the 1989 Loma Prieta earthquake, the elevated Embarcadero Freeway was so badly damaged that it was torn down, and was replaced by a boulevard at ground level. An architect hired by the city also proposed demolition of the fountain, but no decision was made.

In 2004, San Francisco Supervisor Aaron Peskin renewed the call to demolish the fountain. The water supply to the fountain had been turned off for several years, because of California's energy crisis of those years. Armand Vaillancourt immediately pledged that he would "fight like a devil to preserve that work". Debra Lahane, a member of the San Francisco Arts Commission, said that "it succeeds as a work of art if it provokes dialogue and discussion. Art that engages the public has had a measure of success." Within a few months, the water was flowing again, and plans to tear down the fountain were abandoned. The San Francisco Chronicle's urban design critic continued to advocate for keeping it as discussion continued about the future of Embarcadero Plaza.

=== Embarcadero Plaza renovation project and fountain removal ===
In 2024, the city unveiled plans for renovating portions of Embarcadero Plaza and Sue Bierman Park into a 5-acre park (2.0 ha) through a public–private partnership with BXP, Inc., owner of the adjacent Embarcadero Center.

Provisional plans did not include the fountain, which Mayor London Breed joked had as its "only function ... to block the view of the bay." In early 2025, the city commissioned an independent consultant to create a Historic Resource Review (HRR), to ascertain if the fountain met the definition of a historic resource according to the California Environmental Quality Act (CEQA), and conditions assessment, to determine the physical state of the fountain.

In May 2025, the consultant's Historic Resource Review (HRR) determined the fountain to be a historic resource. In October 2025, the San Francisco Planning Department concurred with the historic resource determination.

In June 2025, the consultant's conditions assessment of the fountain concluded that "Vaillancourt Fountain exhibits a range of deterioration that must be addressed for it to continue to be enjoyed safely". The fountain was fenced off to protect the public during the same month.

On August 18, 2025, the San Francisco Recreation & Parks Department formally requested deaccessioning and removal of the fountain in a letter to the San Francisco Arts Commission. The letter noted that the fountain was"...a critical design challenge in the Embarcadero Plaza and Sue Bierman Park project..." A week later, Vaillancourt sent a cease and desist letter.

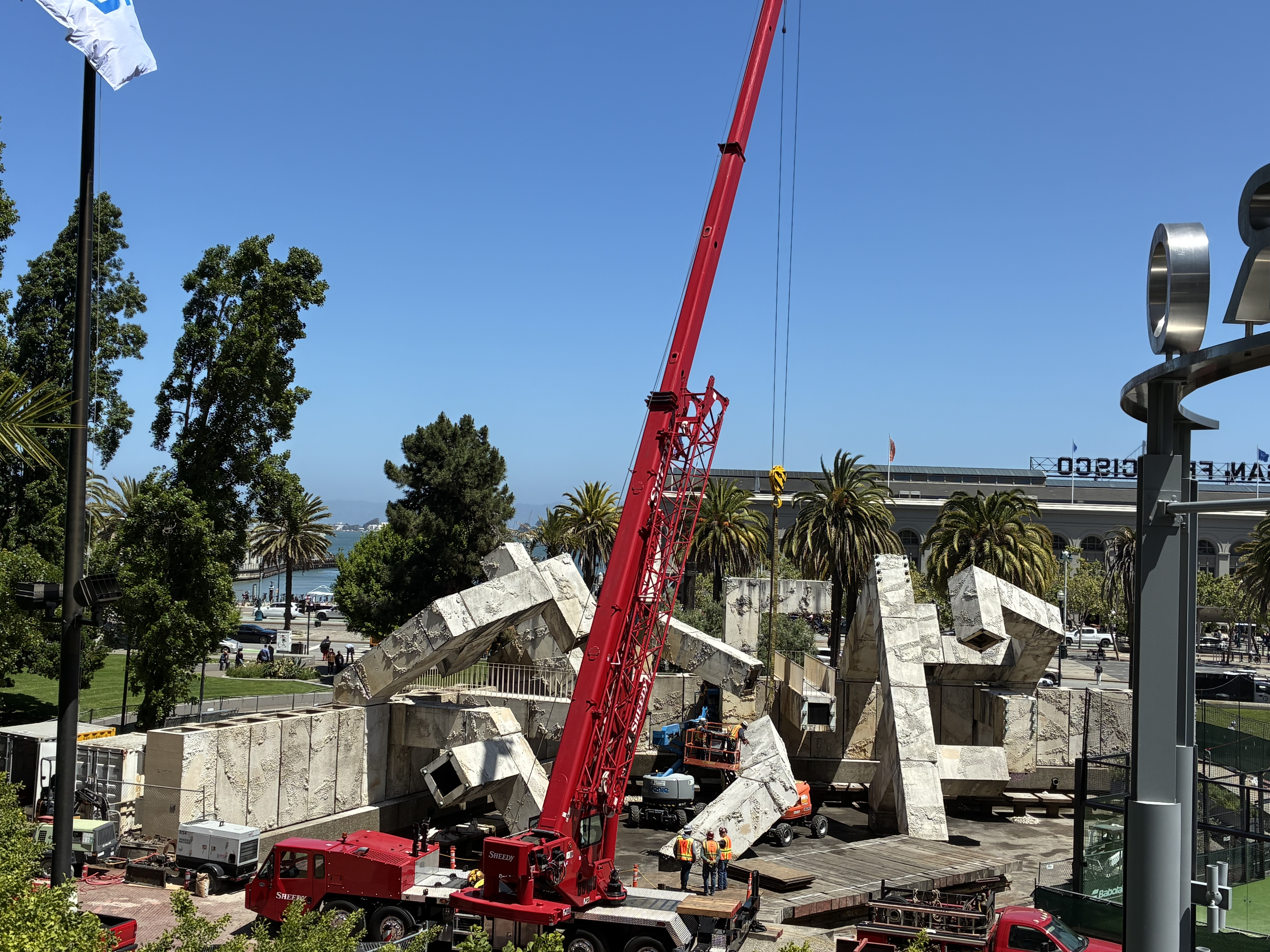
The former Vaillancourt Fountain on April 30, 2026, the fourth day of its disassembly.

Three San Francisco Arts Commission hearings regarding the fountain were held:

- September 5, 2025: The commission held a closed session on the fountain.
- October 6, 2025: The commission held an open session on the history of the fountain.
- November 3, 2025: The commission held an open session on a motion for removal of the fountain as an emergency project.

On November 3, 2025, the Arts Commission voted 8-5 to approve the removal of the Embarcadero Fountain and to affirm the Planning Department’s determination under the California Environmental Quality Act that "this action is statutorily exempt from further review under Section 15269 of the CEQA Guidelines." The artist was given 90 days to remove the fountain before the city dismantles it and puts it in storage for up to three years.

Disassembly and removal of the fountain began on April 27, 2026. The budget for the removal is $4 million and the fountain components will be placed in storage. In May 2026, the fountain caught fire during demolition works.

== Critical reaction ==
The fountain has been considered controversial since its construction, and criticism of it has continued over the years. Hoving, in his dedication speech, said of the fountain had some of the daring of Baroque sculpture and that "A work of art must be born in controversy." Herman himself said it was "one of the greatest artistic achievements in North America."

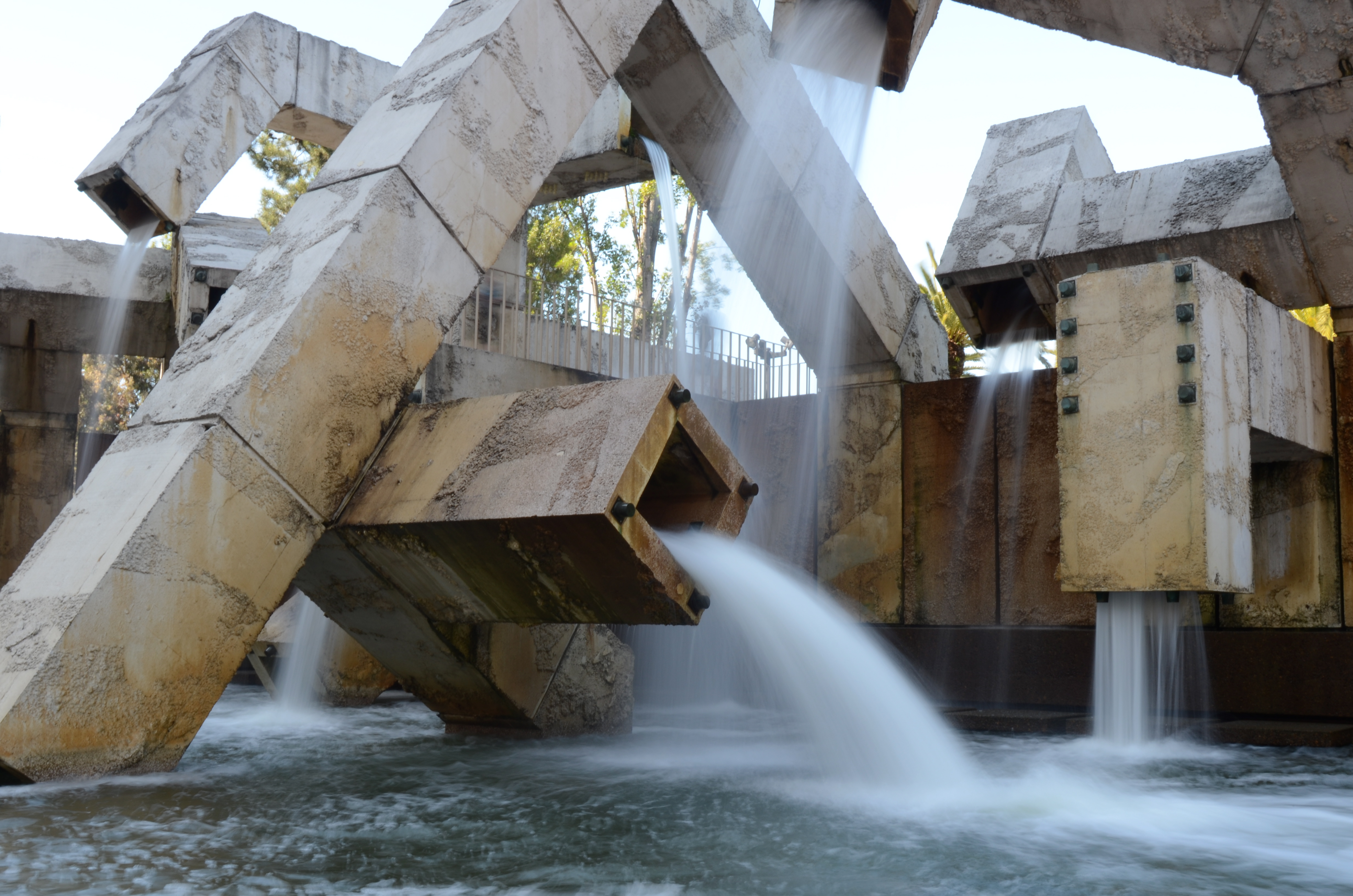
Vaillancourt Fountain in operation (2011)

At the time of its dedication, the San Francisco chapter of the National Safety Council said that the fountain "may be a safety hazard". Opponents of the work handed out leaflets at the dedication of the fountain describing it as a "loathsome monstrosity", a "howling obscenity", an "obscene practical joke", "idiotic rubble", and a "pestiferous eyesore". Art critic Alfred Frankenstein of the San Francisco Chronicle responded that "its very outrageousness and extravagance are part of its challenge" and therefore, it "can't be all bad." He added that the fountain was intended to be participated in rather than just observed. An early comment by architecture critic Allan Temko, often repeated over the years, described "technological excrescences" that had been "deposited by a giant concrete dog with square intestines". Another pithy remark that gained press attention, from critic Lloyd Skinner, was that the fountain was "Stonehenge, unhinged, with plumbing troubles".

Artists have been critical of the work as well. Sculptor Benny Bufano called it "a jumble of nothing", artist Willard Cox likened it to "dynamited debris", and sculptor Humphrey Diaquist said it had been created by "a figure of deranged talent". Ruth Asawa noted in 1989 that "In the attempt to provide a disguise and diversion from the freeway, the goal of the fountain as a work of art was lost."

The fountain has been called the "least revered modernist work of art" in San Francisco. Due to its size, it has been said that it "dominates the landscape" of the north side of Embarcadero Plaza. It has also been said that the design intent was "to mock and mirror the clumsy, double-decked roadway", referring to the elevated Embarcadero Freeway which separated the fountain from the waterfront at the time of construction.

Charles Birnbaum, noted Halprin expert, stated the architect "always wanted people to interact with his water features" and that Embarcadero Plaza "was intended as a total environment, a space animated by people as well as water", so the fountain was designed to attract the public to an area otherwise cut off from the waterfront by the Embarcadero Freeway.

== Gallery ==
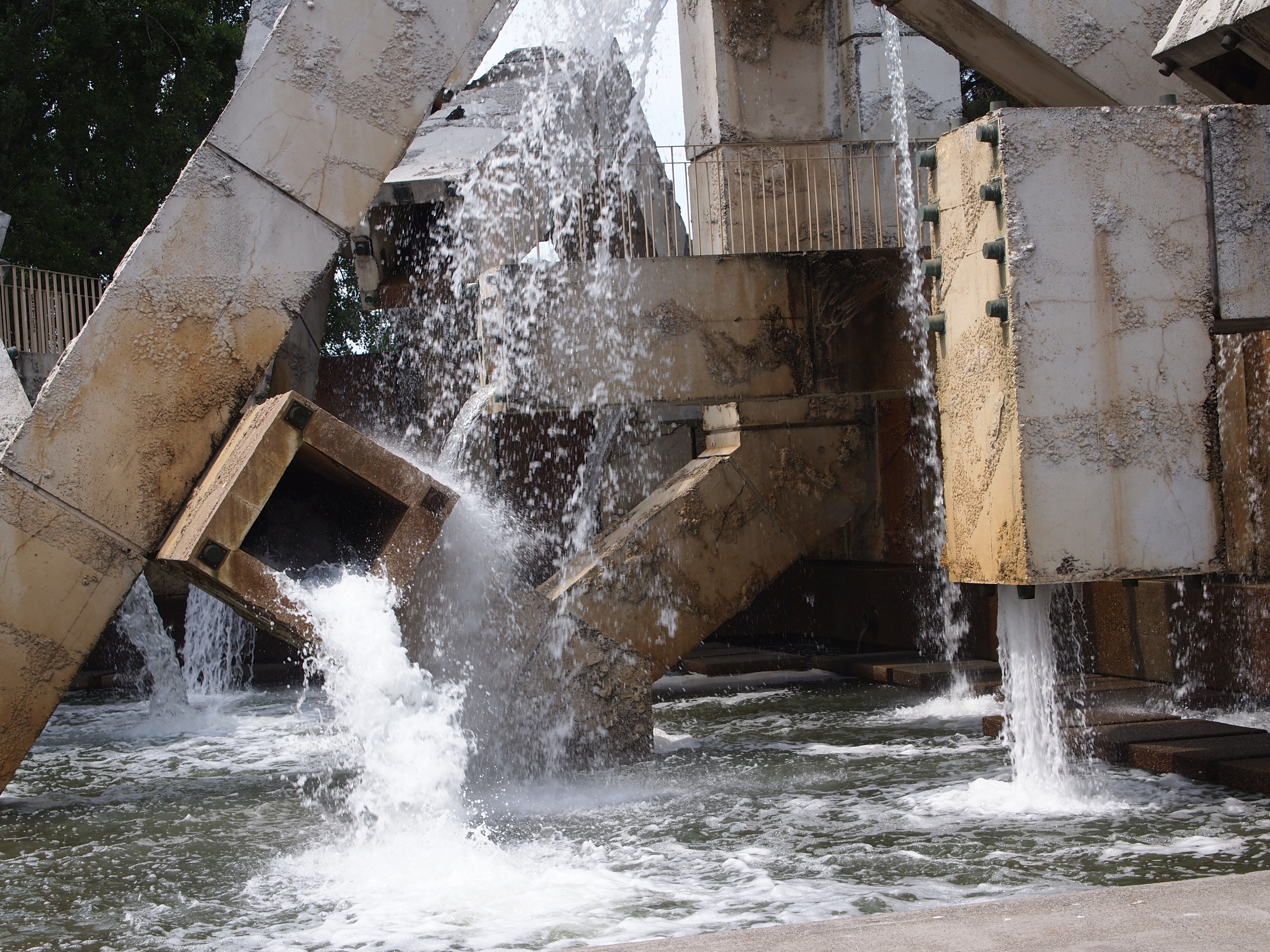
Detail showing one of the two aerial walkways (2011)

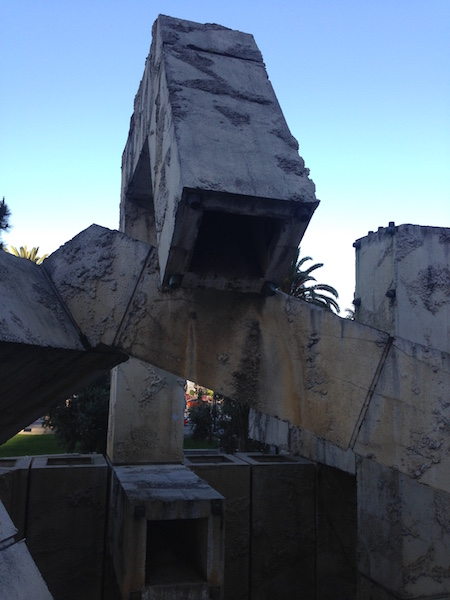
Dry pipes (2016)

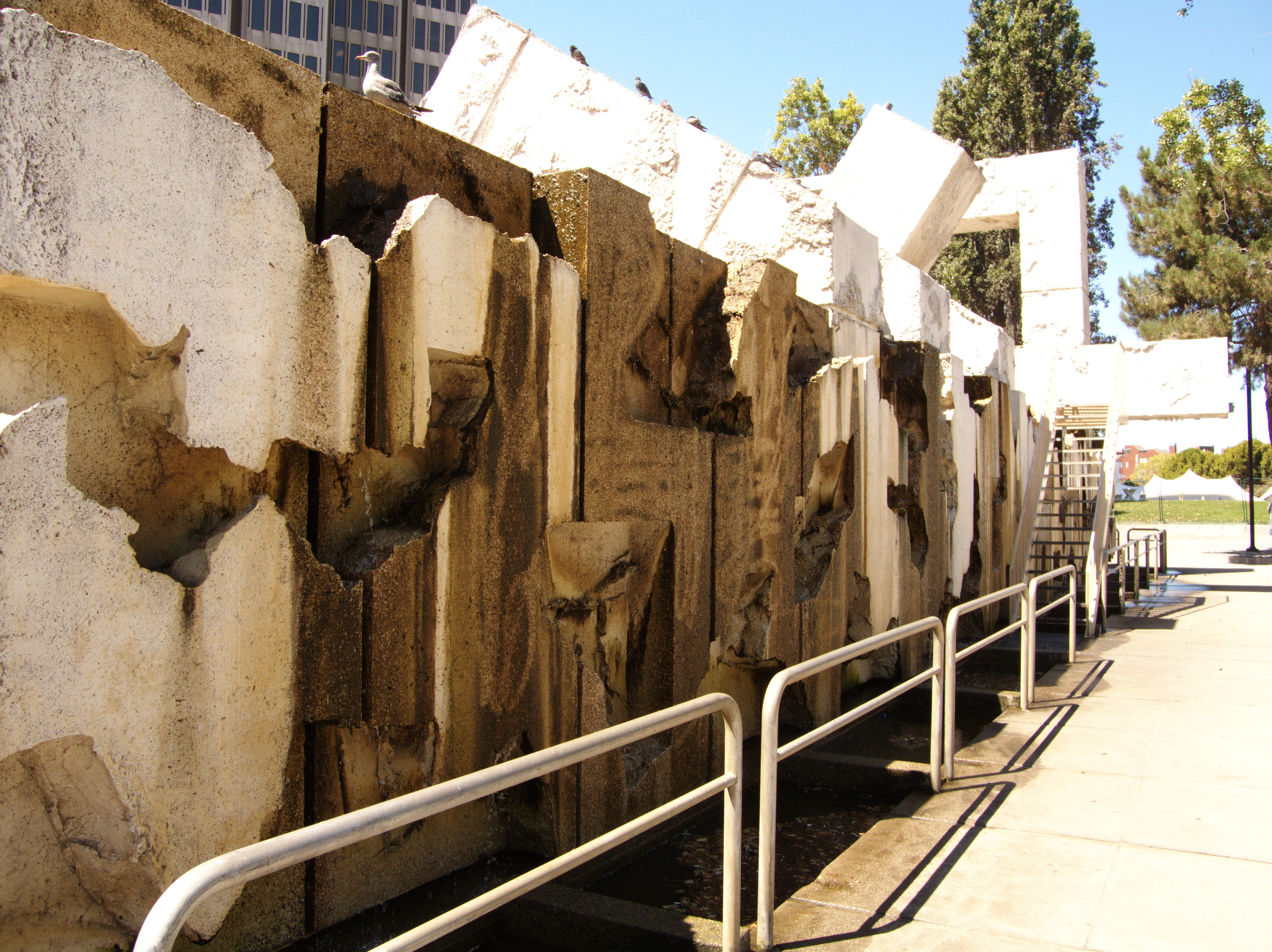
Rear wall, with stair access to overlook (2010)

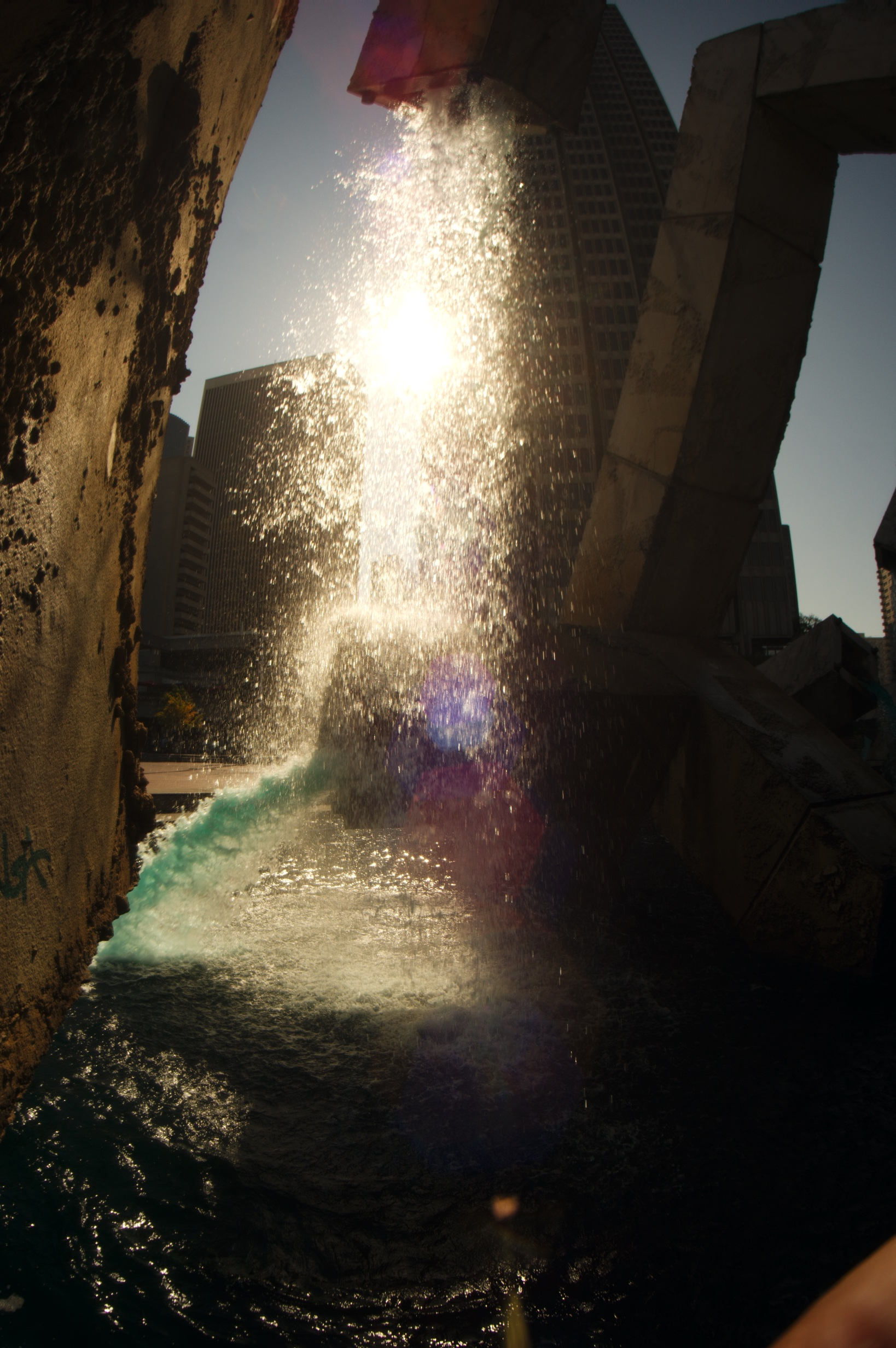
Inside the running fountain (2017)

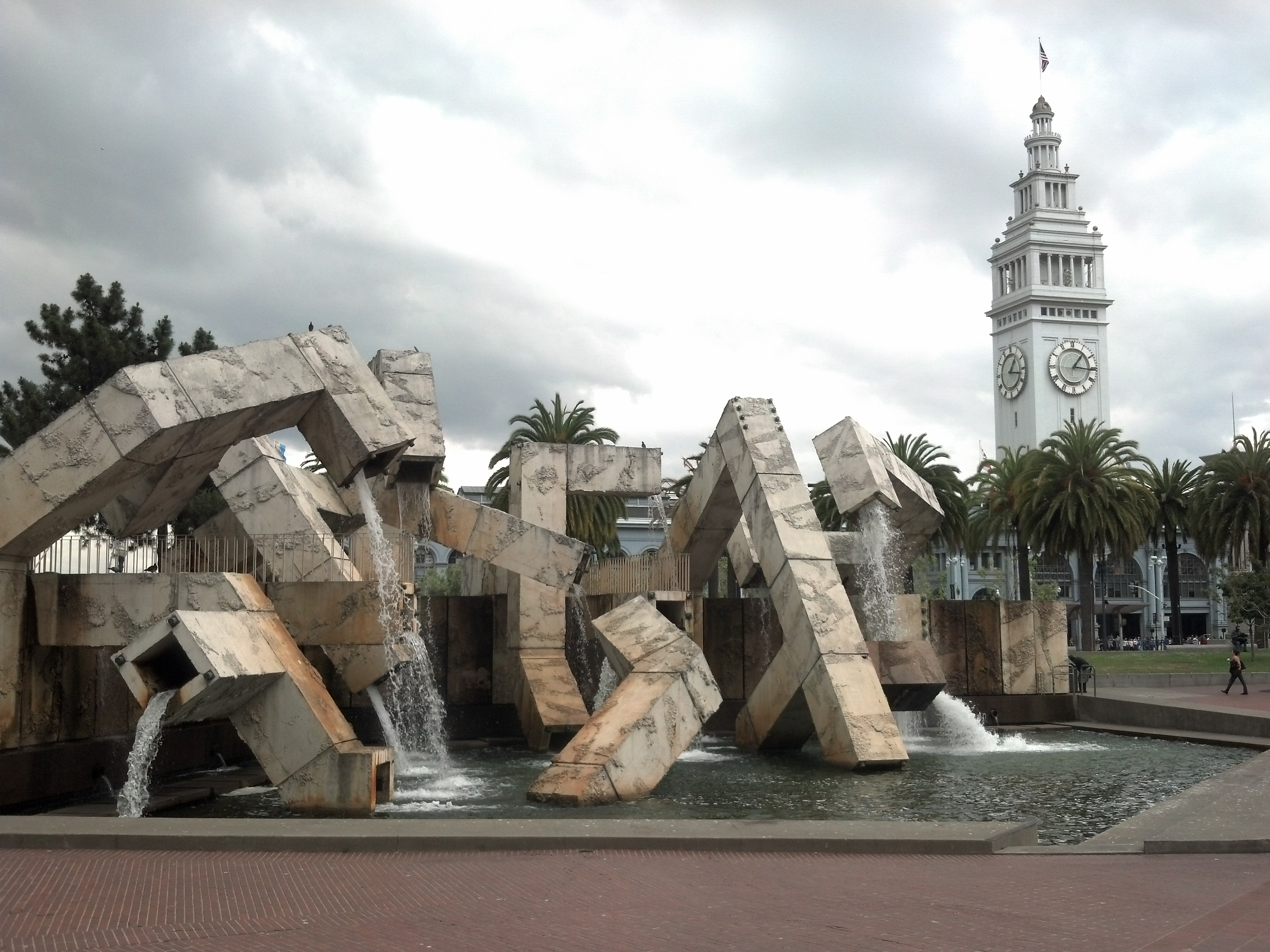
Across The Embarcadero from the Ferry Building (2013)

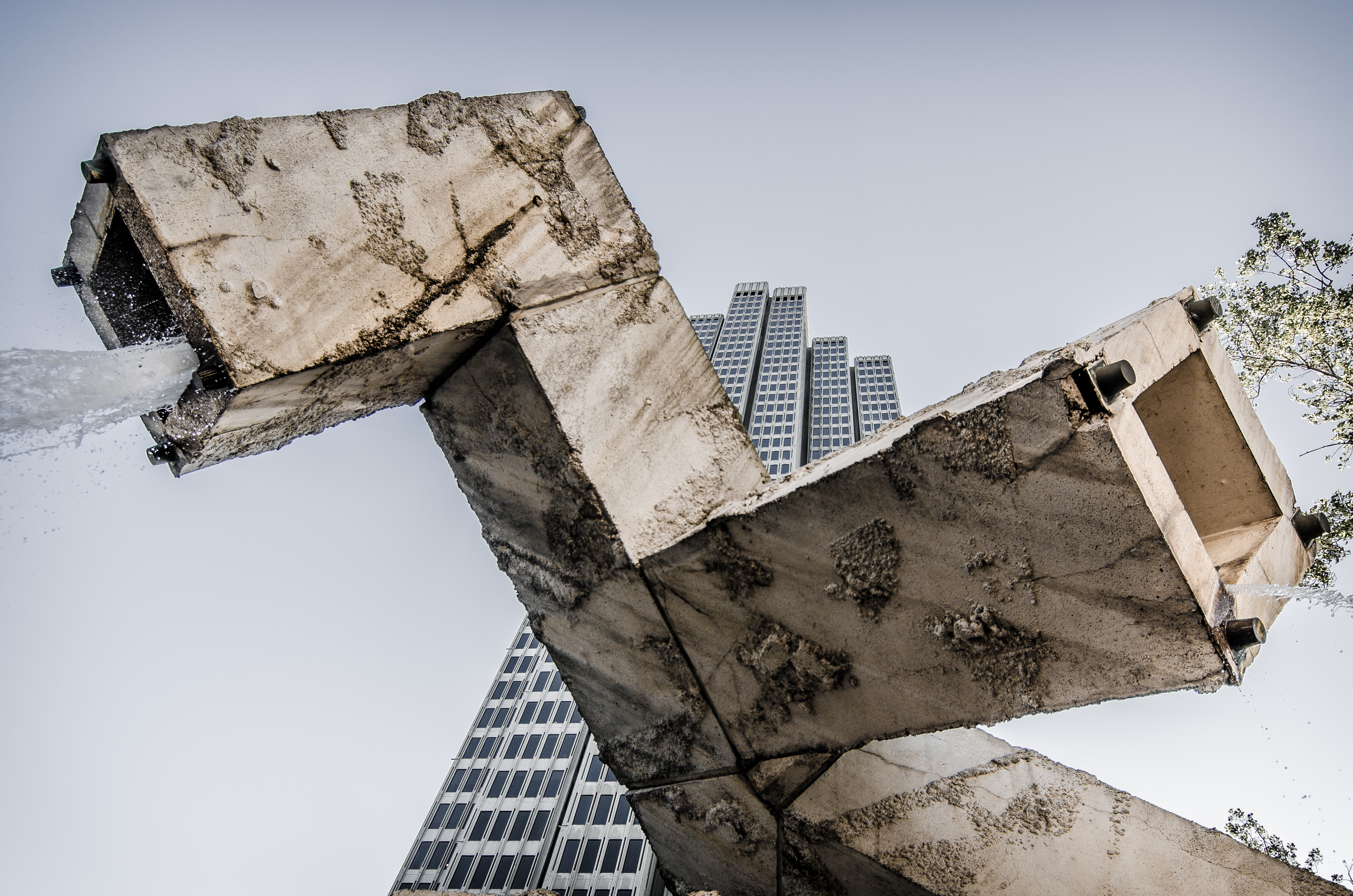
Looking up at Four Embarcadero Center, rough texture retained (2012)

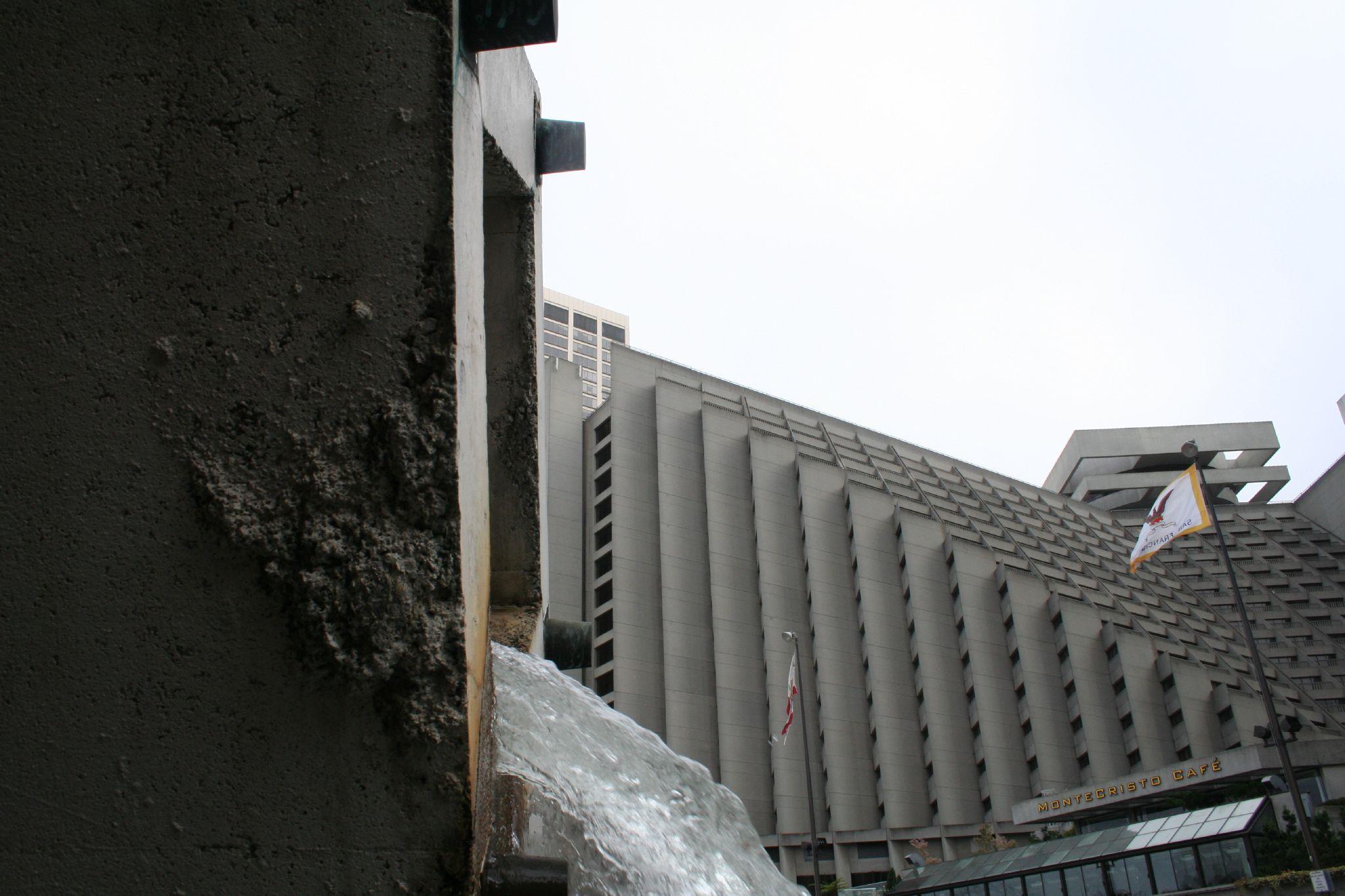
Hyatt Regency San Francisco (2007)

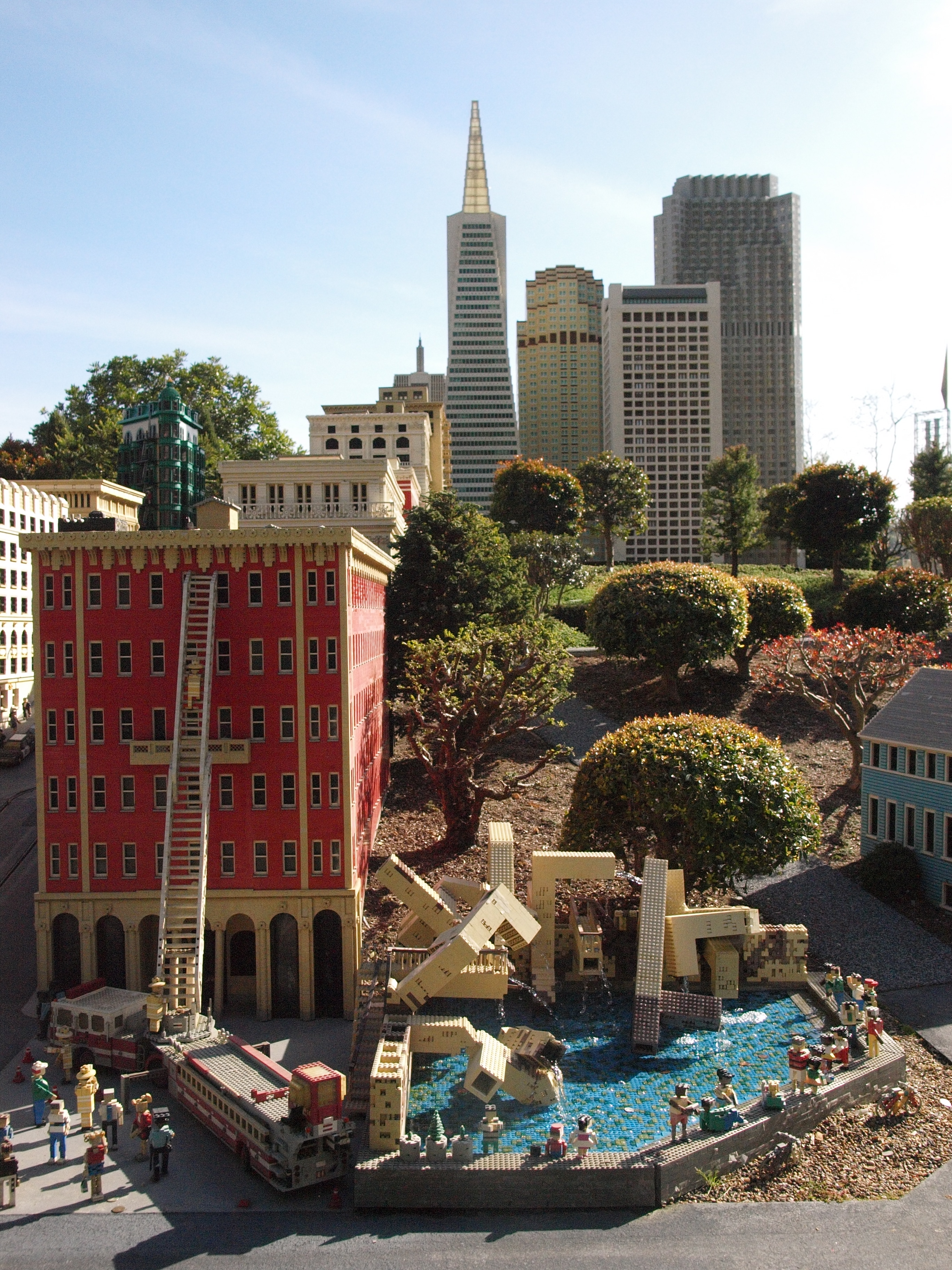
Reproduced in LEGO bricks at Miniland in Legoland California (2011)

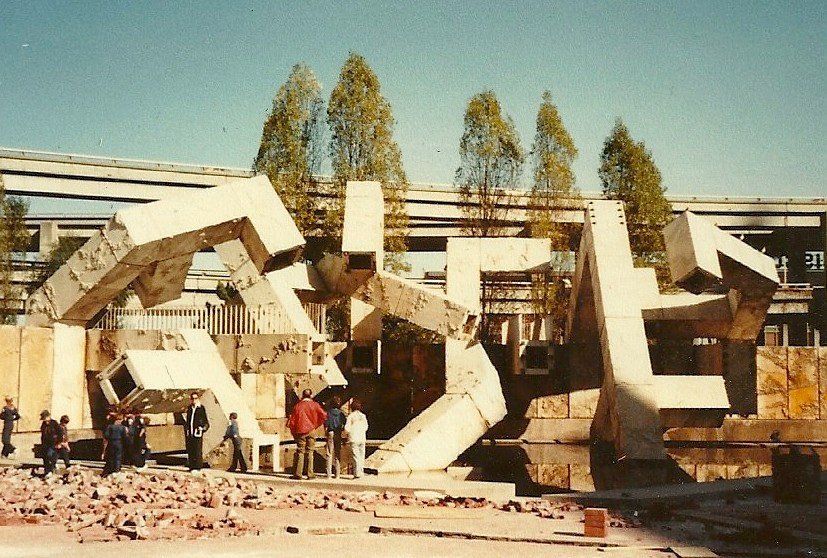
Under renovation with Embarcadero Freeway in background (1980)

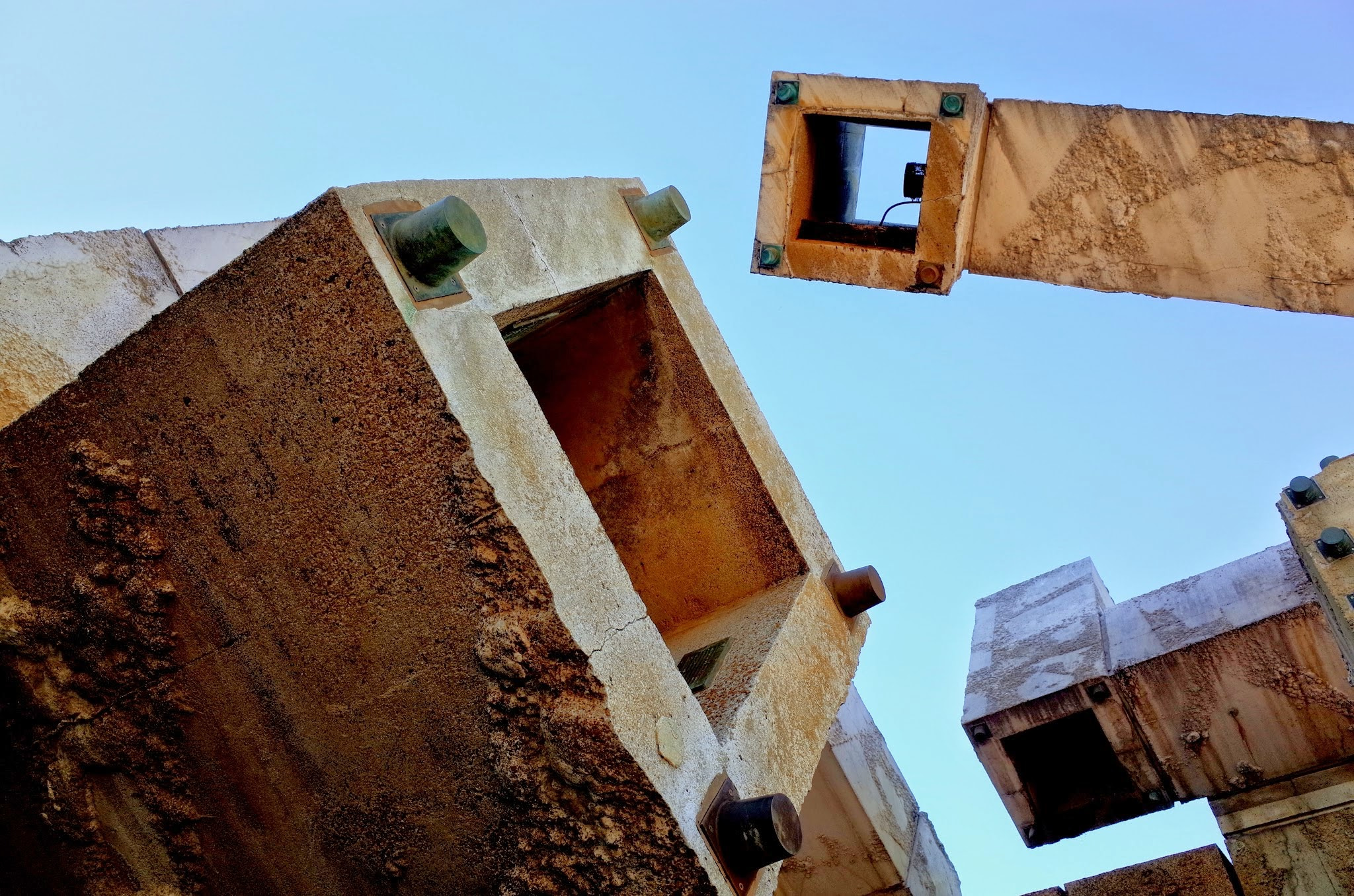
Pipe detail (dry fountain) (2014)

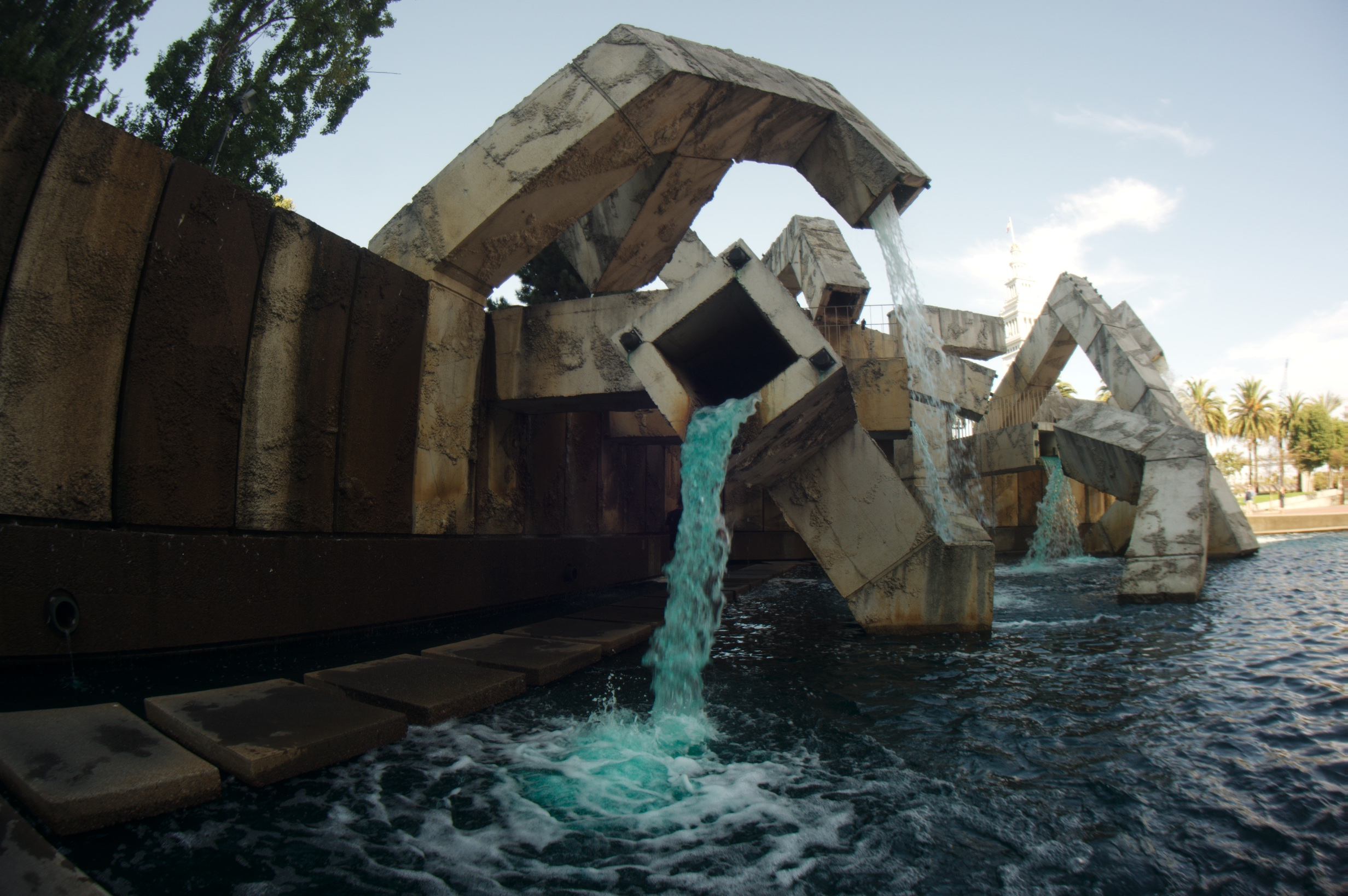
With tinted water (2017)

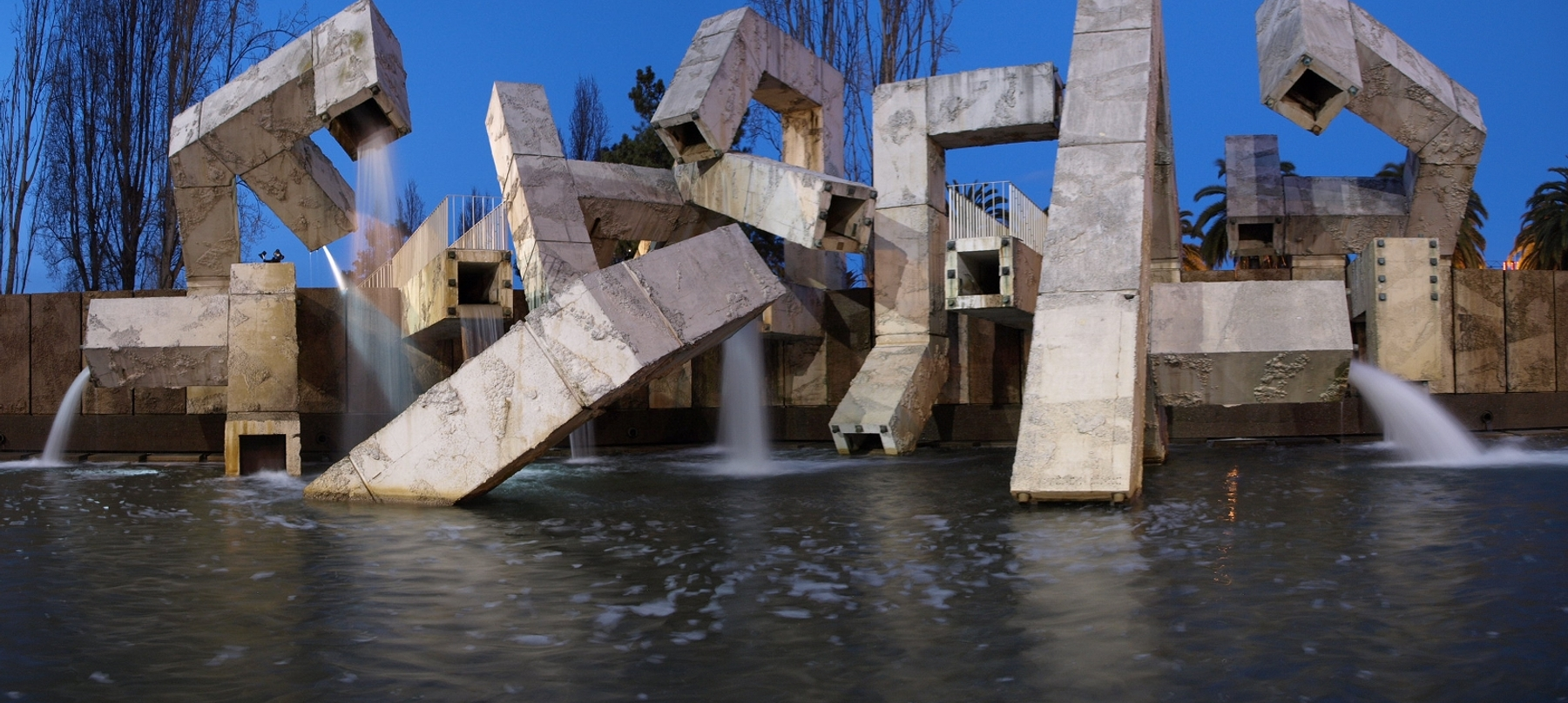
Slow exposure for water motion (2008)

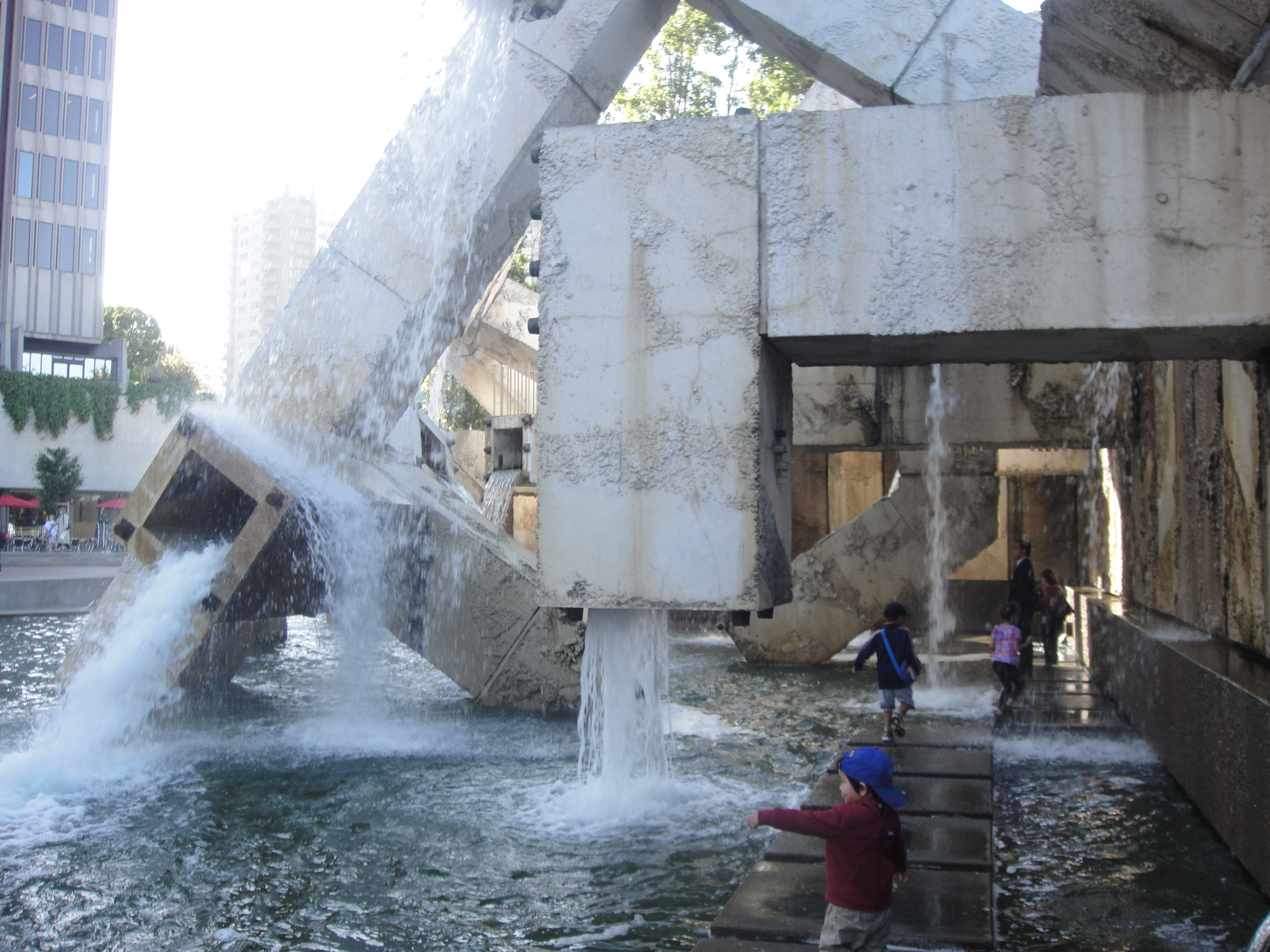
Popular with children (2010)

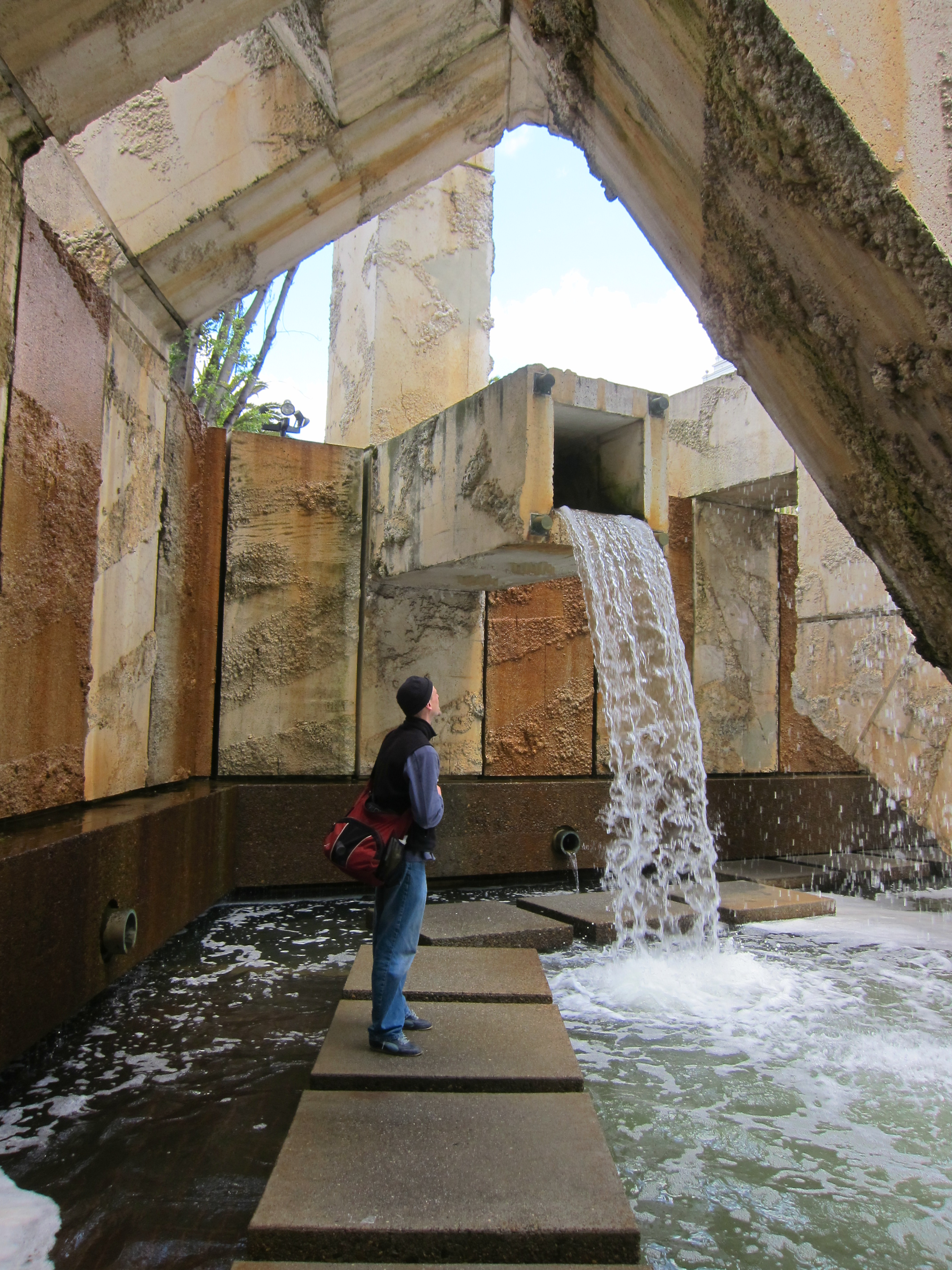
Pedestrian access via water level platforms (2011)

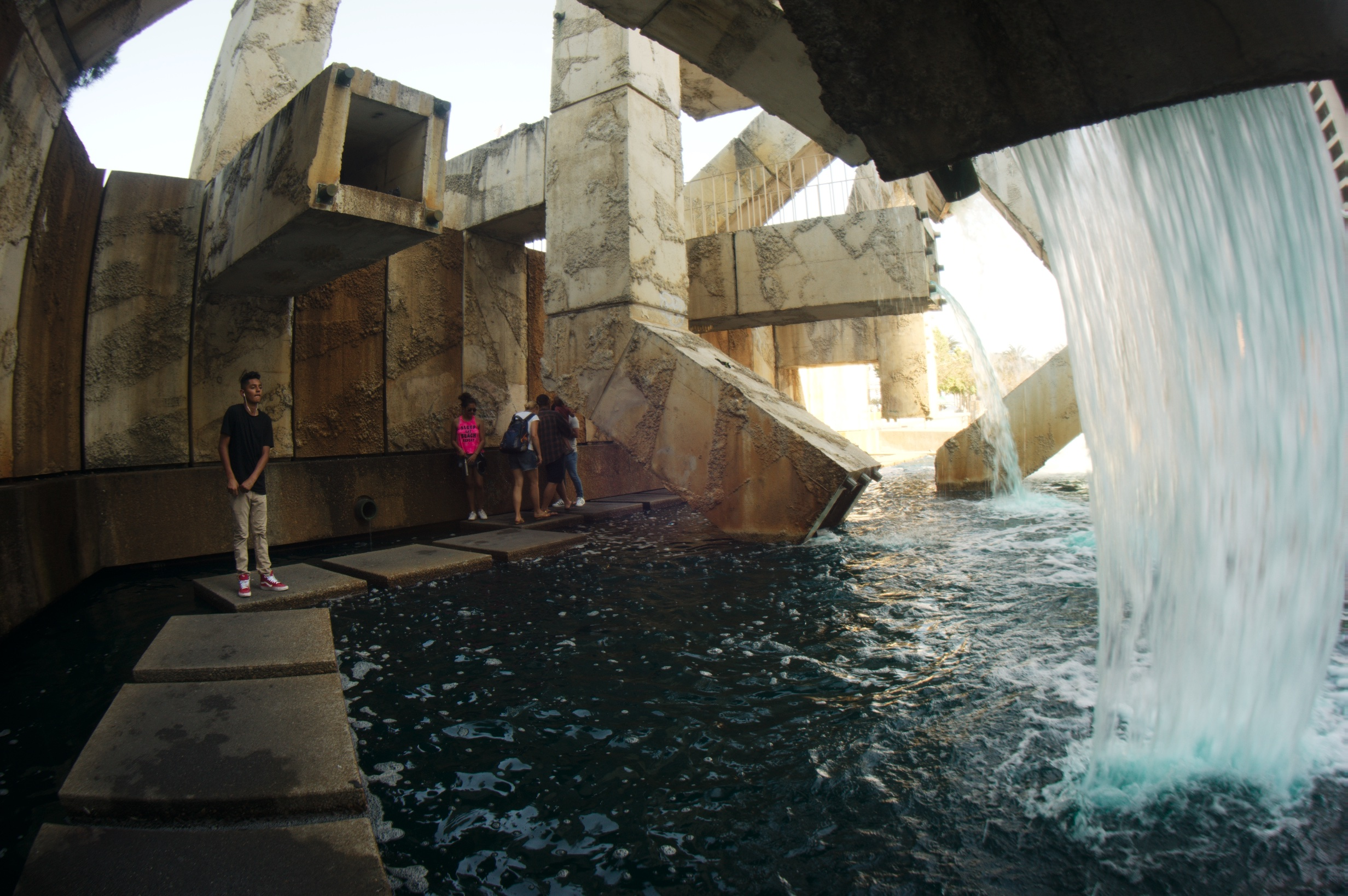
Square platforms allow access inside the fountain (2017)

== See also ==
- Vive le Québec libre
