= Embarcadero Center =

Commercial complex in San Francisco

Coordinates: 37.794722°N 122.397778°W

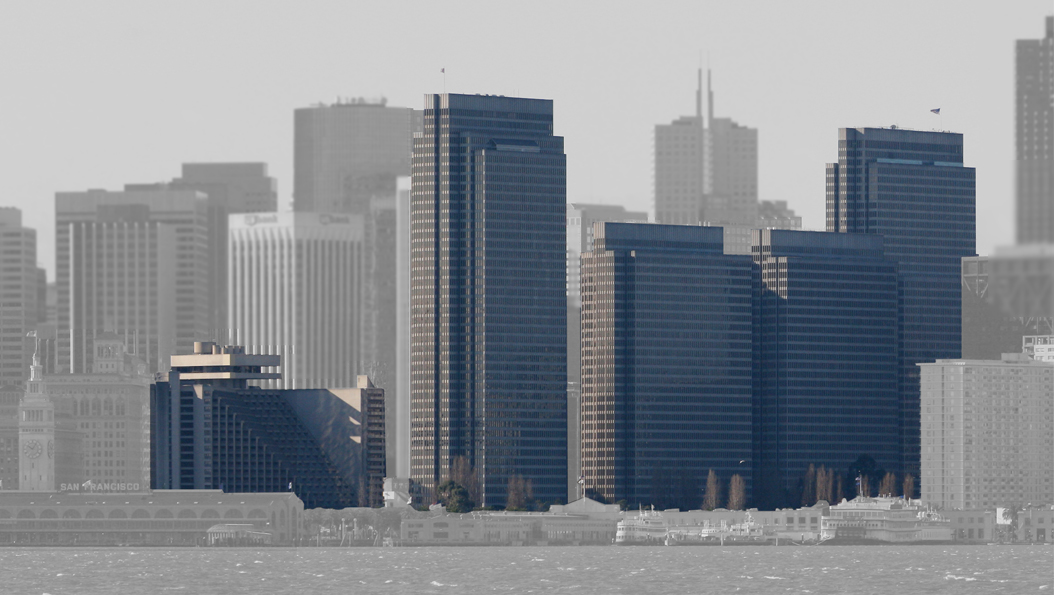
The buildings which are highlighted are the Hyatt Regency at left and four towers. Not shown: the Le Méridien hotel, located behind the other buildings, towards the right of the rightmost highlighted tower

Embarcadero Center is a commercial complex of four office towers, two hotels, and a shopping center located in San Francisco. An outdoor ice skating rink is open in the center during winter months.

Embarcadero Center sits on a 9.8-acre (4.0 ha) site largely bounded by Clay Street (to the north), Sacramento Street (to the south), Battery Street (to the west), and the Embarcadero (to the east). It is in the financial district of San Francisco. The 4.8-million-square-foot (450,000 m^{2}) complex accommodates offices for 14,000 people along with mixed-use areas accommodating retail, dining, entertainment, and cinema functions.

== History ==
In 1971, construction began with Tower One. The project was developed by Trammell Crow, David Rockefeller, and John Portman. In 1989, the last off-complex extension, Embarcadero West, was completed. The two extension buildings are west of Battery Street. In December 2005, Boston Properties sold the Embarcadero West building to Teachers Insurance and Annuity Association (TIAA-CREF) for more than US$205 million (equivalent to $330 million in 2024).

In February 2022, the cinema's operator closed its doors permanently.

== Structures ==
Embarcadero Center campus and surroundings
1 One Embarcadero Center
2 Two Embarcadero Center
3 Three Embarcadero Center
4 Four Embarcadero Center
5 Five Embarcadero Center (Hyatt Regency San Francisco)
6 Embarcadero West
7 Le Méridien San Francisco
8 Embarcadero Plaza
9 Vaillancourt Fountain
10 Sue Bierman Park

Name	Height	Floors	Year	Notes
One	173 m 568 ft	45	1971	
Two	126 m 413 ft	30	1974	
Three	126 m 413 ft	31	1977	
Four	174 m 571 ft	45	1982	
Five (Hyatt Regency)	77 m 253 ft	20	1973	
Embarcadero West	123 m 404 ft	34	1989	Detached from main complex, sold in 2005, no longer part of the complex
The Jay Hotel	96.36 m 316.1 ft	25	1988	Formerly Le Méridien San Francisco, before that the Park Hyatt Hotel

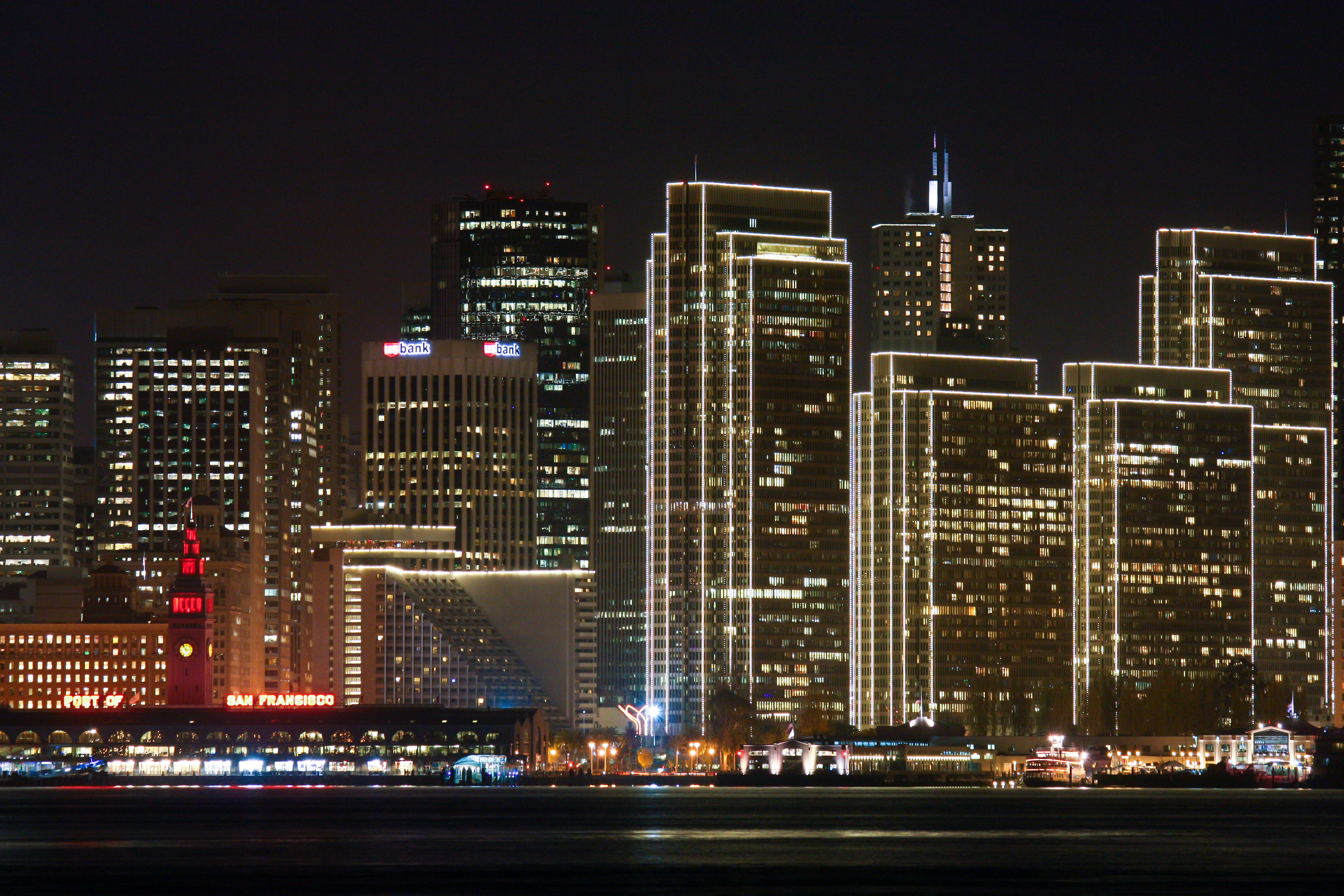
Night, with edge lighting effects

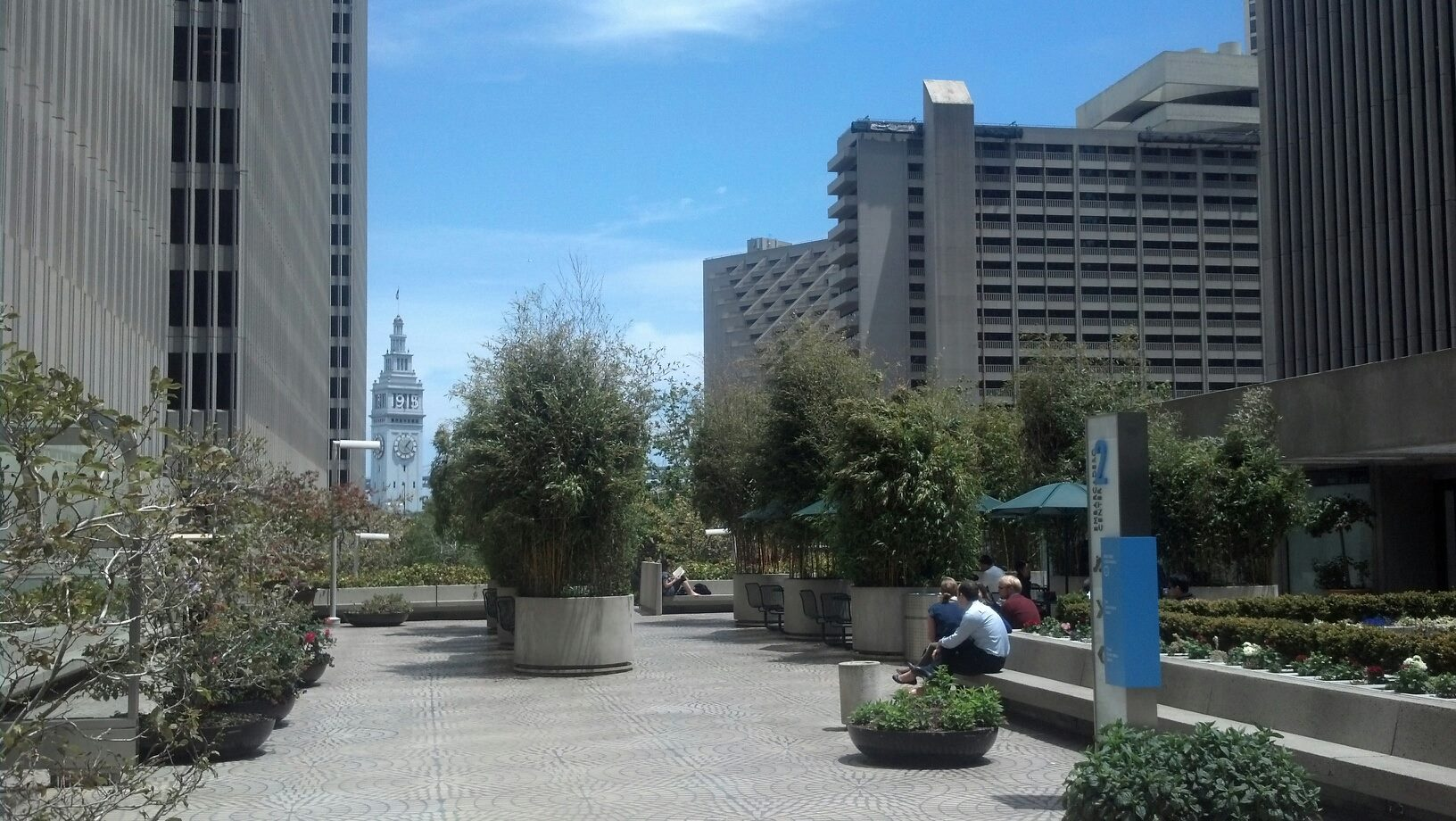
Plaza Level of Two Embarcadero Center towards the back of the Hyatt Regency and the Ferry Building

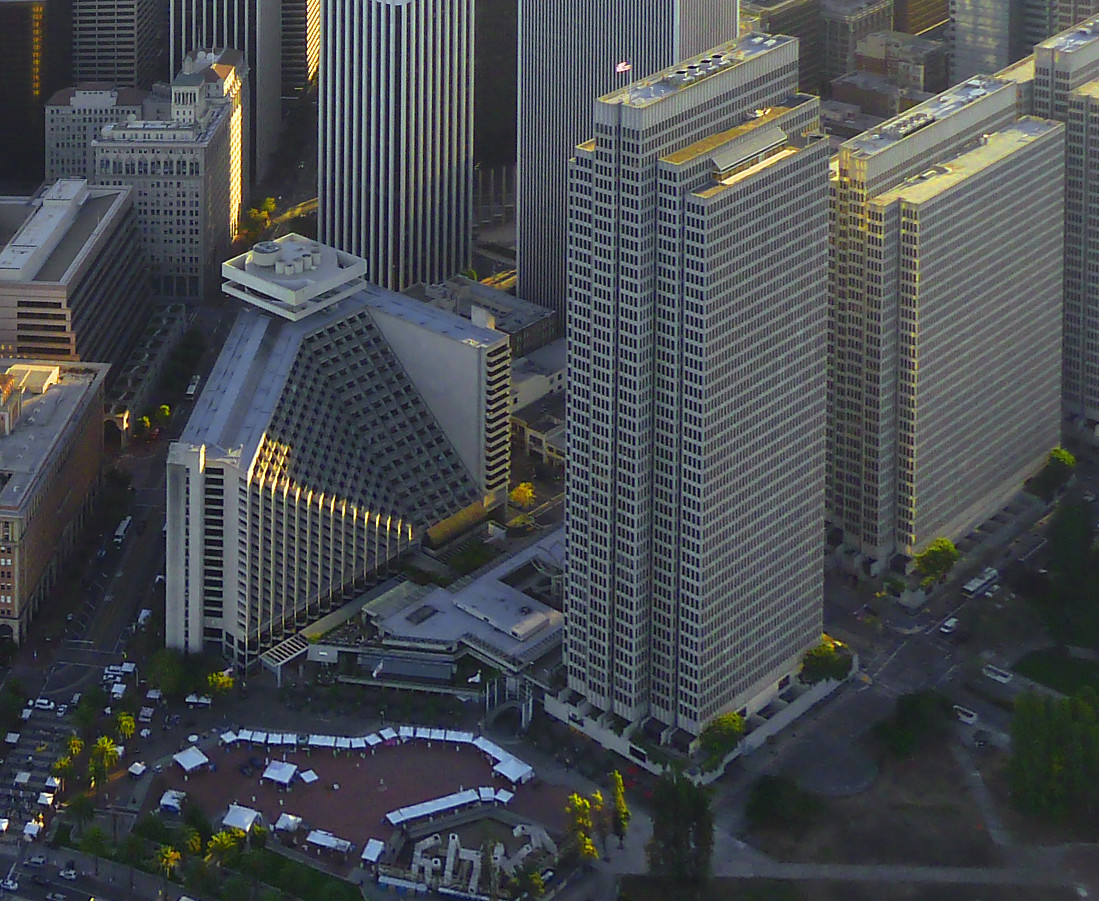
Aerial view of Five (Hyatt Regency), Four, and Three Embarcadero Center (L–R), with brick-paved Embarcadero Plaza in the foreground

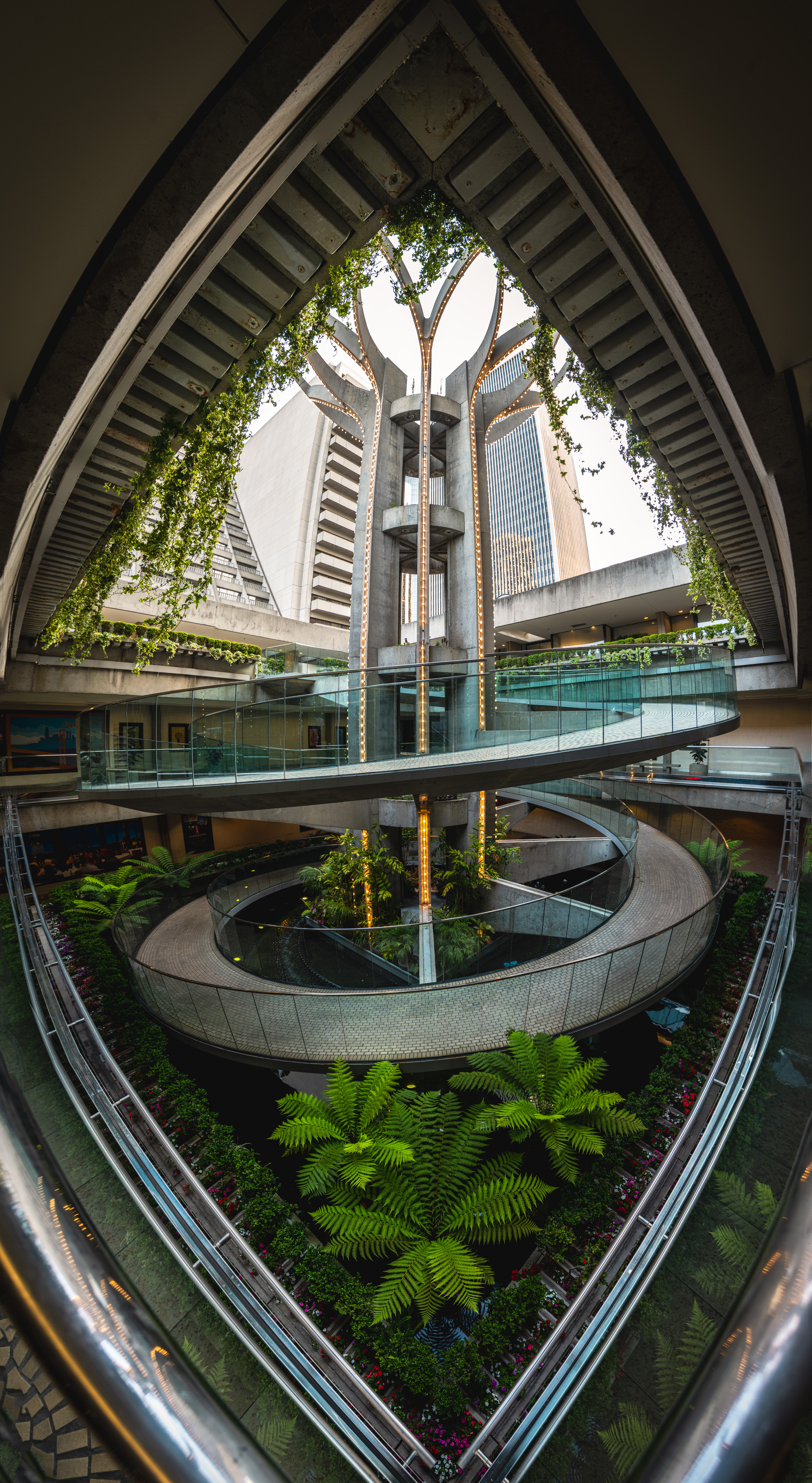
A spiral ramp connects the 3 levels of the Four Embarcadero Center shopping mall

== See also ==
- Embarcadero station (BART)
- Peachtree Center, Atlanta
- Renaissance Center, Detroit
- Rockefeller Center in Manhattan, New York
- Vaillancourt Fountain in San Francisco
- Westin Bonaventure Hotel, Los Angeles
