= One Embarcadero Center =

American skyscraper

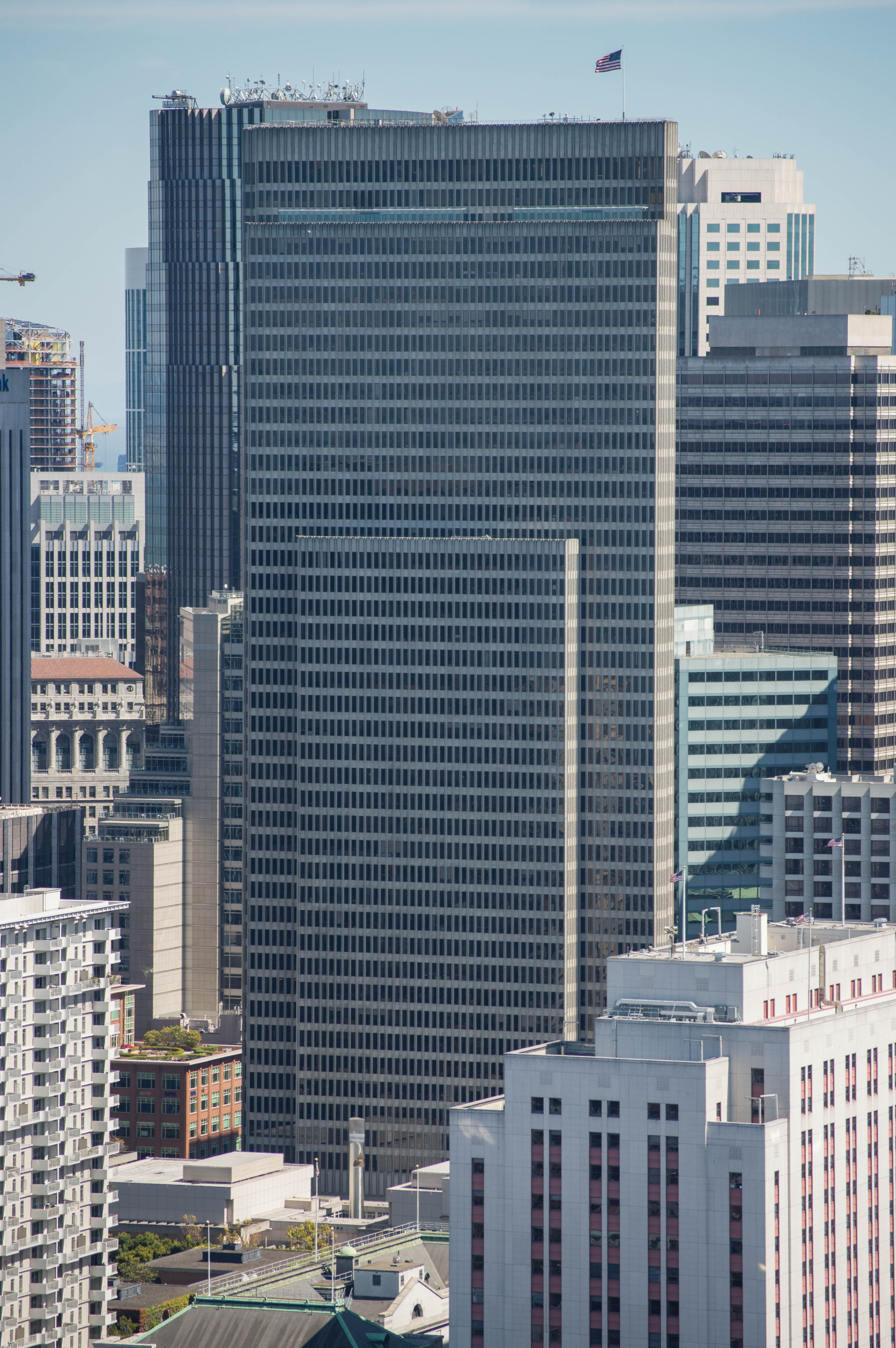
- One Embarcadero Center in 2015

- Location within San Francisco Location within California Location within the United States
- Alternative names: Security Pacific Tower

General information
- Type: Commercial offices
- Location: 355 Clay Street; San Francisco, California
- Coordinates: 37.7945°N 122.3997°W
- Completed: 1971
- Owner: Boston Properties

Height
- Antenna spire: 187 m (614 ft)
- Roof: 173.4 m (569 ft)

Technical details
- Floor count: 45
- Floor area: 833,900 sq ft (77,470 m^{2})

Design and construction
- Architect: John Portman & Associates
- Main contractor: Dillingham Construction

One Embarcadero Center is a class-A office skyscraper in the Financial District of San Francisco, California. The building is part of the Embarcadero Center complex of six interconnected buildings and one off-site extension. The skyscraper, completed in 1971, stands 569 ft (173 m) tall with 45 stories without its flagpole. One Embarcadero Center is the second-tallest building out of the entire complex, standing one foot shorter than Four Embarcadero Center, which is the tallest in the complex.

As of 2021, Boston Properties owns the building.

Part of Francis Ford Coppola's The Conversation was filmed in One Embarcadaro. The Laughing Policeman starring Walter Matthau and Bruce Dern also was filmed at One Embarcadero Center.

== See also ==
- List of tallest buildings in San Francisco
