= Four Embarcadero Center =

Class A office skyscraper in the Financial District of San Francisco

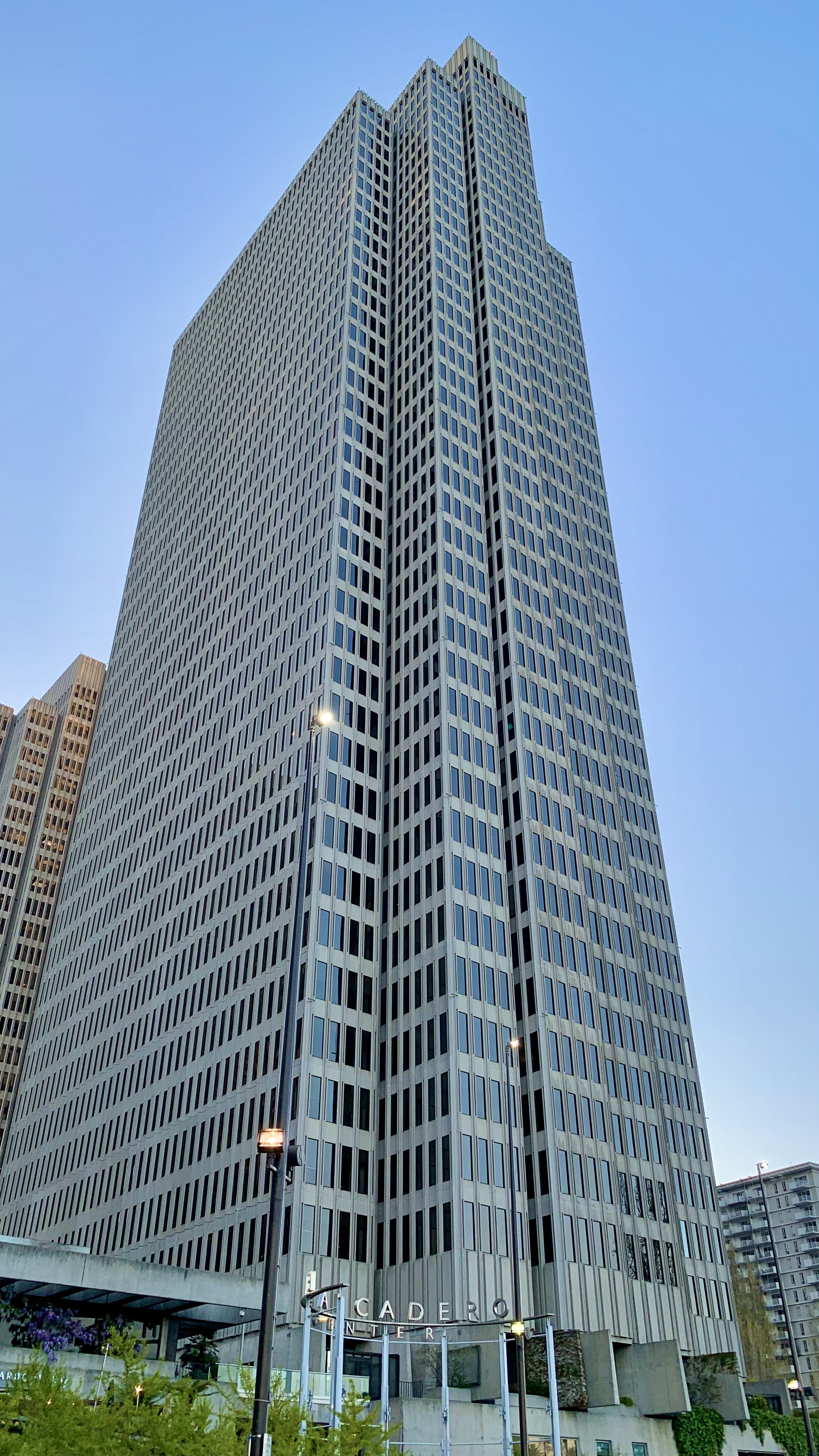
- In April 2021

- Location within San Francisco Four Embarcadero Center (California) Four Embarcadero Center (the United States)

General information
- Type: Commercial offices
- Location: 55 Clay Street; San Francisco, California
- Coordinates: 37.7952°N 122.3961°W
- Completed: 1982
- Owner: Boston Properties

Height
- Roof: 173.74 m (570.0 ft)

Design and construction
- Architect: John Portman & Associates

Four Embarcadero Center is a class-A office skyscraper in the Financial District of San Francisco, California. The building is part of the Embarcadero Center complex of six interconnected buildings and one off-site extension. The skyscraper, completed in 1982, stands 174 m (571 ft) with 45 stories. Four Embarcadero Center is the tallest building out of the entire complex, standing at slightly taller than One Embarcadero Center, which is the second tallest in the complex without its flagpole.

== History ==
As of 2021, the complex is owned by Boston Properties. In 1998, they purchased the four towers along with 275 Battery Street and the Old Federal Reserve Bank Building from Prudential Insurance Co. and David Rockefeller for US$1.22 billion.

== See also ==
- List of tallest buildings in San Francisco
