= The Jay Hotel =

Hotel in San Francisco, California

The Jay, Autograph Collection
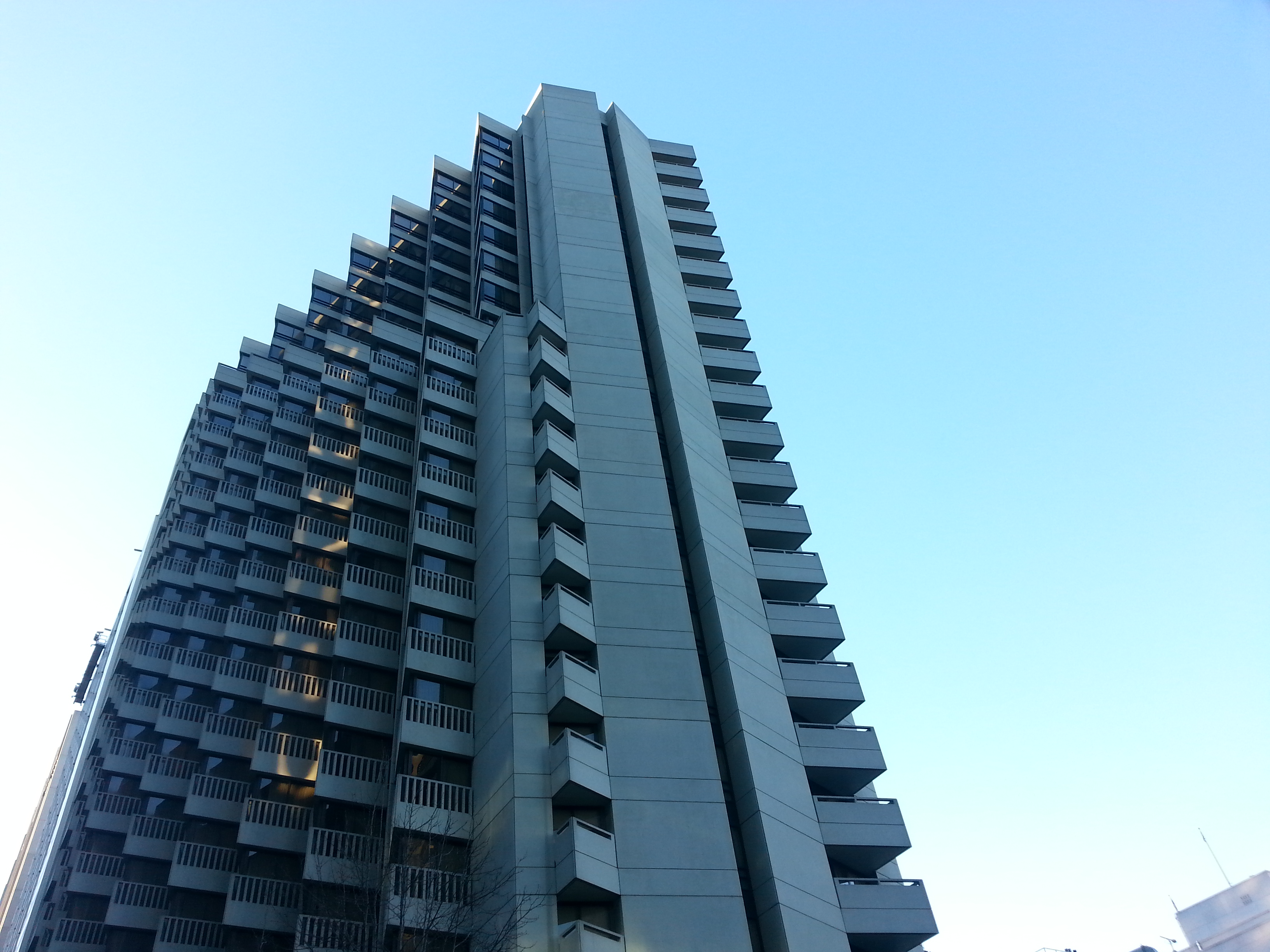

- Location within San Francisco Location within California Location within the United States
- Hotel chain: Autograph Collection

General information
- Location: United States, 433 Clay Street; San Francisco, California; 94111
- Coordinates: 37.7946°N 122.4006°W
- Opening: 2023
- Owner: KHP Capital Partners
- Operator: Marriott International

Height
- Height: 265 ft (81 m)

Technical details
- Floor count: 25
- Floor area: Meeting space: 16,000 sq ft (1,500 m^{2})

Design and construction
- Architect: John C. Portman Jr.

Other information
- Number of rooms: 360
- Number of restaurants: The Third Floor; Prelude

Website
- jayhotelsf.com/

The Jay, Autograph Collection is a 360-room hotel in the embarcadero/financial district of San Francisco, California, United States.

== History ==
The Jay, Autograph Collection Hotel opened as the Park Hyatt San Francisco in 1988. HEI Hotels & Resorts bought the hotel from SHC Park San Francisco, a subsidiary of Strategic Hotel Capital, on May 9, 2006, and rebranded it as Le Méridien San Francisco the following day, under franchise from Starwood.

In 2010, Chesapeake Lodging Trust bought the hotel from HEI for $143 million. Chesapeake was acquired in 2019 by Park Hotels & Resorts. In 2021, KHP Capital Partners bought the hotel from Park for $222 million. The hotel was renovated and reopened as The Jay Hotel in November 2023, as part of Marriott's Autograph Collection brand.
