= Hyatt Regency San Francisco =

Hotel in California, United States

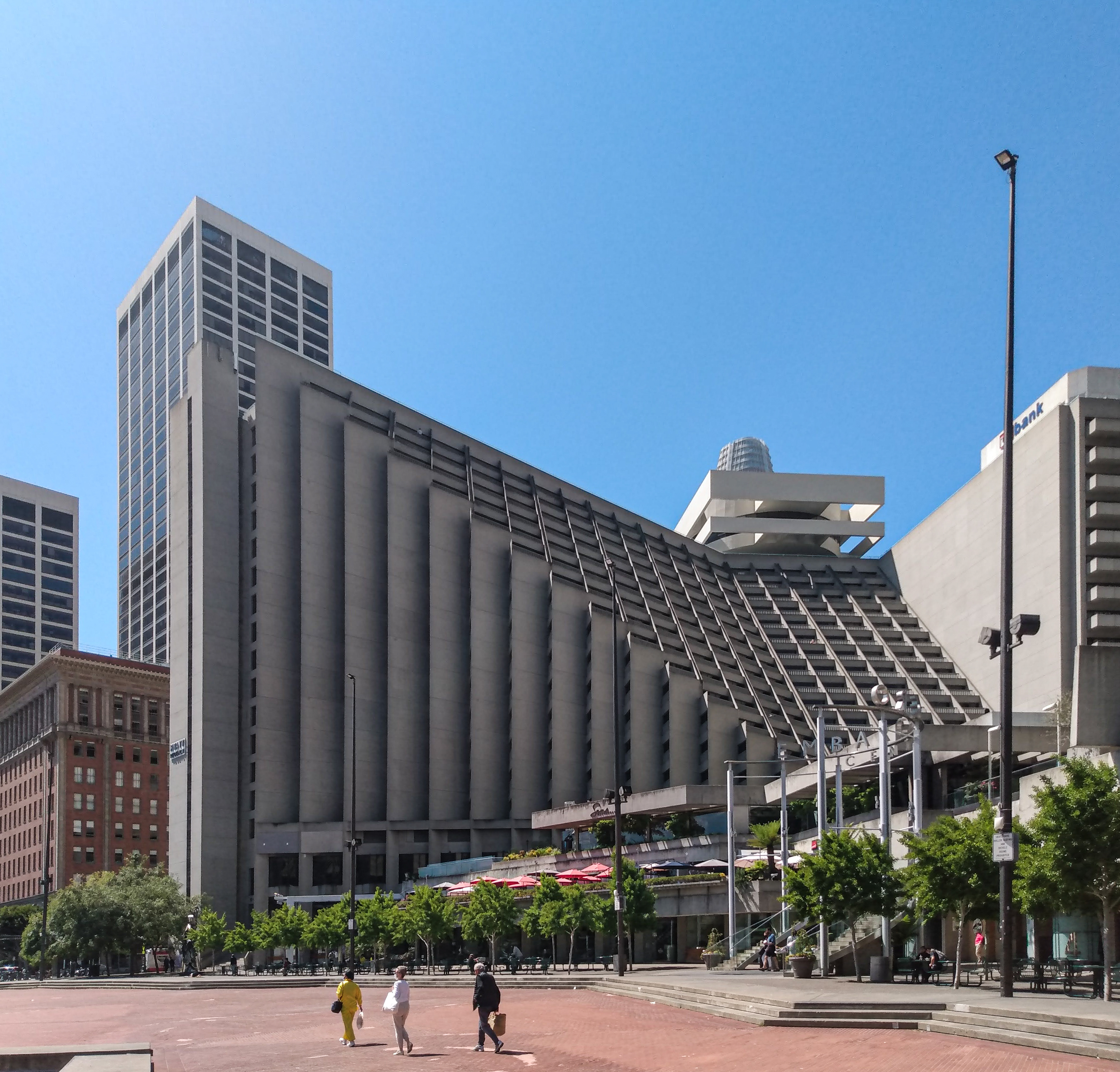
- Hyatt Regency San Francisco, 2021

- Location within San Francisco Location within California Location within the United States
- Hotel chain: Global Hyatt Corporation

General information
- Location: United States, Five Embarcadero Center; San Francisco, California
- Coordinates: 37.79432°N 122.39584°W
- Opening: 1973
- Owner: Blackstone Real Estate
- Operator: Hyatt Hotels Corporation

Height
- Height: 77 m (253 ft)

Technical details
- Floor count: 20
- Floor area: 863,400 sq ft (80,210 m^{2})

Design and construction
- Architect: John Portman & Associates
- Developer: Trammell Crow; David Rockefeller; John C. Portman Jr.

Other information
- Number of rooms: 804
- Number of suites: Balcony Suite; Embarcadero Suite
- Number of restaurants: 2

Website
- https://www.hyatt.com/en-US/hotel/california/hyatt-regency-san-francisco/sfors

Hyatt Regency San Francisco is a hotel located at the foot of Market Street and The Embarcadero in the financial district of San Francisco, California. The hotel is a part of the Embarcadero Center development by Trammell Crow, David Rockefeller, and John Portman.

== History ==
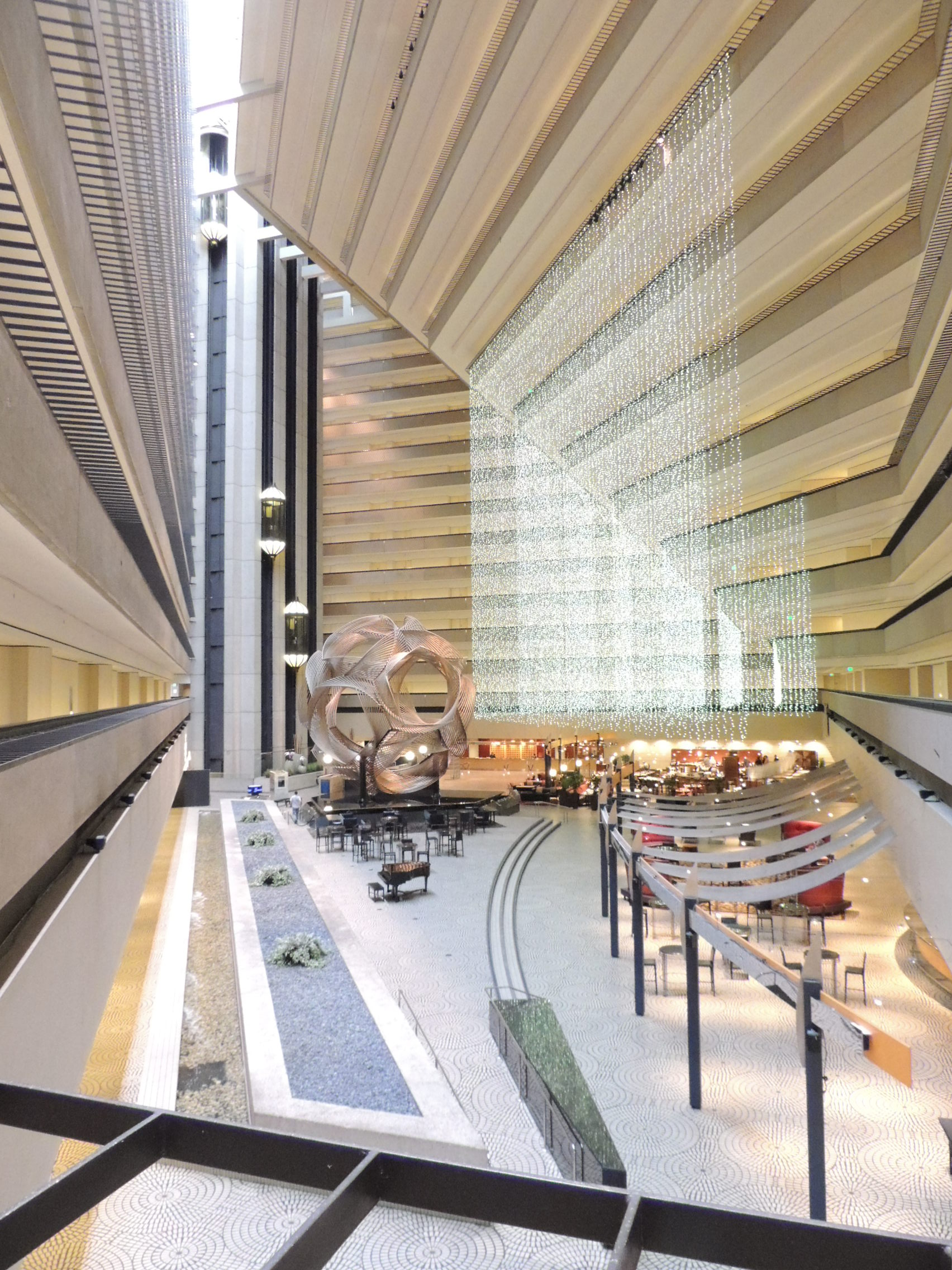
The atrium of the Hyatt Regency San Francisco

The San Francisco Chronicle's architecture critic John King has described the 1973 building as a "temple of hermetic urbanism" in a "self-contained sci-fi" style that by 2016 had become "dated", albeit remaining "still visually dazzling, in a futuristic sort of way." The Regency Club Lounge was once the Equinox, a rooftop revolving restaurant, but is now an elite club for certain hotel guests offering 360-degree views of the city and the bay. The atrium holds the Guinness world record (as of 2024) for the largest hotel lobby, with a length of 107 meters, width of 49 meters and height of 52 meters (15 stories).

The hotel has a large modernist sculpture Eclipse, by Charles O Perry that sits in the lobby.

The hotel was sold by Strategic Hotel Capital LLC, in January 2007 for close to US$200 million to Dune Capital Management and DiNapoli Capital Partners – roughly $250,000 for each of the hotel's 802 rooms. In December 2013, the hotel was purchased by Aliso-Viejo, CA-based Sunstone Hotel Investors, Inc., for $262M. In June 2026, Sunstone sold the hotel to Blackstone Real Estate for $279 million.

== In popular culture ==
The Hyatt Regency's atrium lobby served as the lobby of the Glass Tower in 1974's The Towering Inferno. Replicas of John Portman's trademark pill-shaped elevators were built for use in the film and are featured throughout, including in an extended sequence where one is lifted from the stricken tower by helicopter. The hotel was also featured in the 1977 Mel Brooks comedy High Anxiety, the 1977 spy film Telefon, the 1977 thriller The Domino Principle, and the 1979 romantic thriller 1979 Time After Time.

As well as being a setting for numerous films, the lobby is itself inspired by a film. Architect John Portman has stated that its design was suggested to him by viewing the 1935 science fiction film Things to Come.
