= 275 Battery Street =

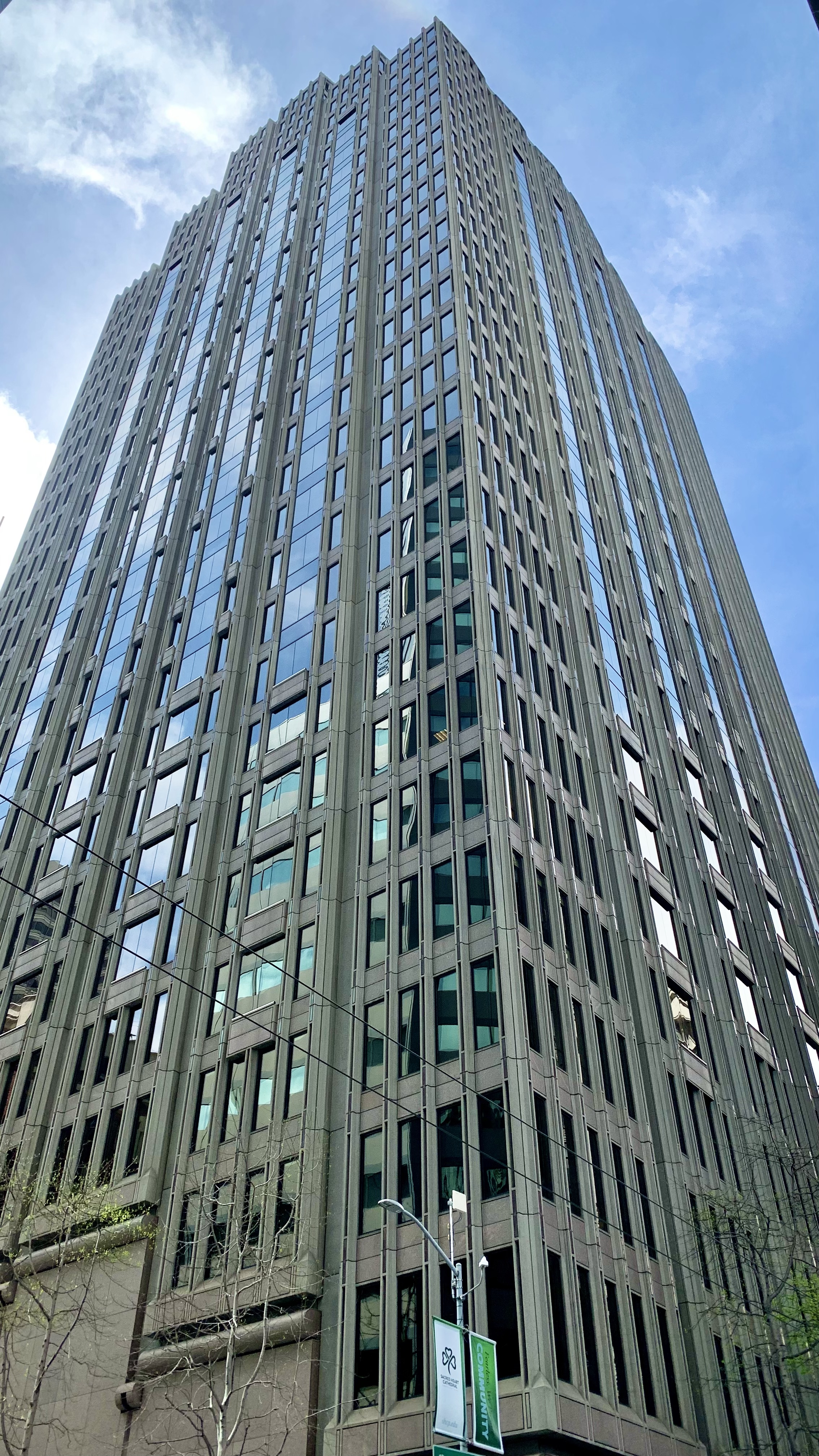
- In April 2021

- Location within San Francisco 275 Battery Street (California) 275 Battery Street (the United States)

General information
- Status: Completed
- Type: Commercial offices
- Architectural style: Modernism
- Location: 275 Battery Street; San Francisco, California
- Coordinates: 37.793861°N 122.400444°W
- Completed: 1989
- Owner: Rockpoint Group

Height
- Roof: 123.1 m (404 ft)

Technical details
- Floor count: 30; 3 below ground
- Floor area: 447,000 sq ft (41,500 m^{2})

Design and construction
- Architect: John Portman & Associates
- Main contractor: Hathaway Dinwiddie

275 Battery Street, formerly known as Embarcadero West, is a 30-story, 123.1 m (404 ft) office skyscraper in the Financial District of San Francisco, California, United States.

== History ==
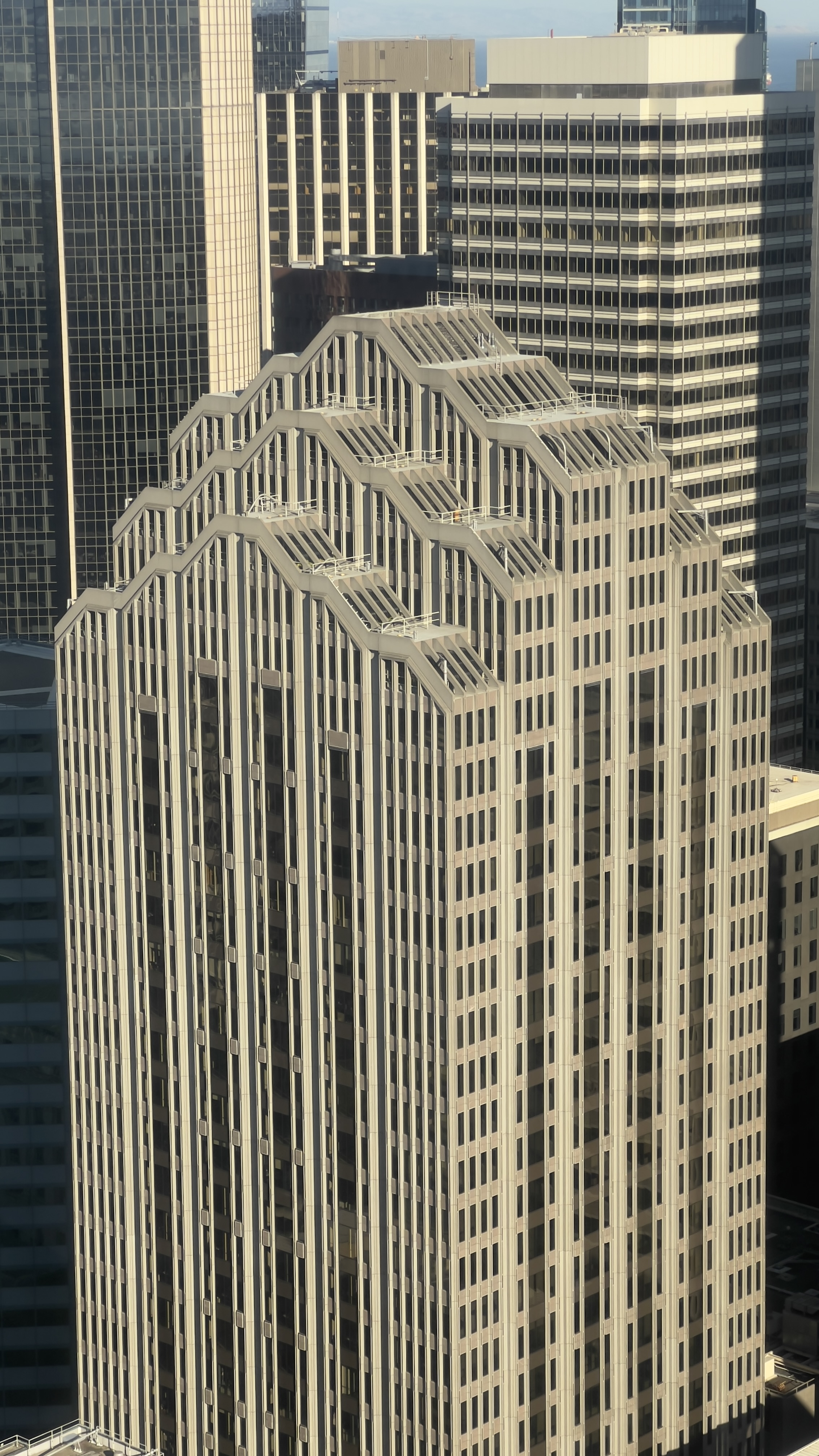
275 Brannan Street seen from Transamerica Pyramid, 2024

The building was completed in 1989 as Embarcadero West, part of the Embarcadero Center complex, containing four other office towers and two hotels. The skyscraper was not connected physically to the other buildings.

Boston Properties, owners of Embarcadero Center, sold the building to Teachers Insurance and Annuity Association (TIAA-CREF) in December 2005 for more than US$205 million.

TIAA-CREF sold the building to Rockpoint Group in October 2014 for around $307 million.

== Tenants ==
- Consulate General of Japan
- Crowell & Moring
- Gordon & Rees
- Lieff Cabraser
- Squire Patton Boggs

== See also ==
- San Francisco's tallest buildings
