= Caltrain =

Commuter rail line in California

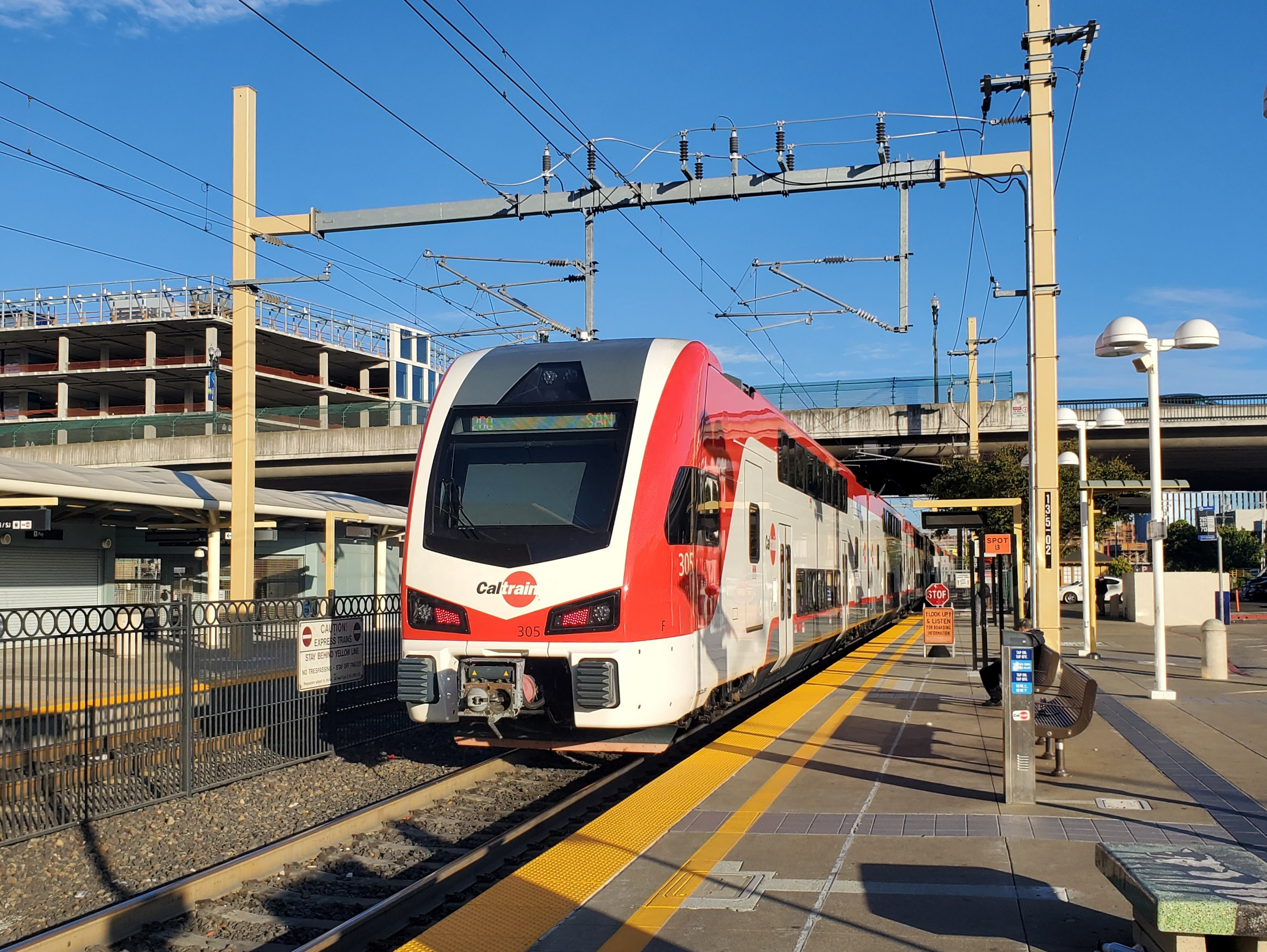
- A train at Millbrae station in 2024

Overview
- Owner: Peninsula Corridor Joint Powers Board
- Area served: San Francisco Peninsula; Santa Clara County
- Transit type: Commuter rail
- Number of lines: 1 line (Note: This refers to the physical tracks that a Caltrain "service" runs on); 5 services (Note: These "services/stopping patterns" run on physical tracks.)
- Number of stations: 30 (list)
- Daily ridership: 39,985 per weekday (August 2025); 25,837 per Saturday (August 2025); 20,821 per Sunday (August 2025)
- Annual ridership: 11,212,300 (2025)
- Headquarters: San Carlos, California
- Website: caltrain.com

Operation
- Began operation: 1985 (as Caltrain); 1863 (as Peninsula Commute)
- Operators: Southern Pacific (1870–1992); Amtrak (1992–2012); TransitAmerica Services (2012–present)
- Reporting marks: JPBX
- Infrastructure manager: Union Pacific (Tamien–Gilroy)
- Character: Commuter railroad with level crossings; limited freight service
- Number of vehicles: 29 locomotives and 134 passenger cars (in revenue service)
- Train length: 7 EMU Passenger Cars

Technical
- System length: 77.2 mi (124.2 km)
- No. of tracks: 2+
- Track gauge: 4 ft 8 1/2 in (1,435 mm) standard gauge
- Electrification: Overhead line, 25 kV 60 Hz AC (San Francisco to Tamien)
- Top speed: 79 mph (127 km/h)
System map
Caltrain highlighted in red

Caltrain (reporting mark JPBX) is a commuter rail line in California, serving the San Francisco Peninsula and Santa Clara County. The southern terminus is in San Jose at the Tamien station, with weekday rush-hour service extending to Gilroy. The northern terminus of the line is in San Francisco at 4th and King Street. Caltrain has express, limited, and local services. There are 28 regular stops, one limited-service weekday-only stop (College Park), and one weekend-only stop (Broadway). While average weekday ridership in 2019 exceeded 63,000, impacts of the COVID-19 pandemic have been significant: in March 2026, Caltrain had an average weekday ridership of 41,968 passengers.

Caltrain is governed by the Peninsula Corridor Joint Powers Board (PCJPB) which consists of transit agencies from the three counties served by Caltrain: Santa Clara, San Francisco, and San Mateo. Each member agency has three representatives on a nine-member Board of Directors. The member agencies are the Santa Clara Valley Transportation Authority, the San Francisco Municipal Transportation Agency, and the San Mateo County Transit District (SamTrans).

After historically relying on diesel locomotives, Caltrain electrified 51 miles (82 km) of its route between San Francisco and Tamien, and has transitioned to electric service, with diesel trains remaining in service between San Jose and Gilroy.

== History ==
=== Southern Pacific service ===
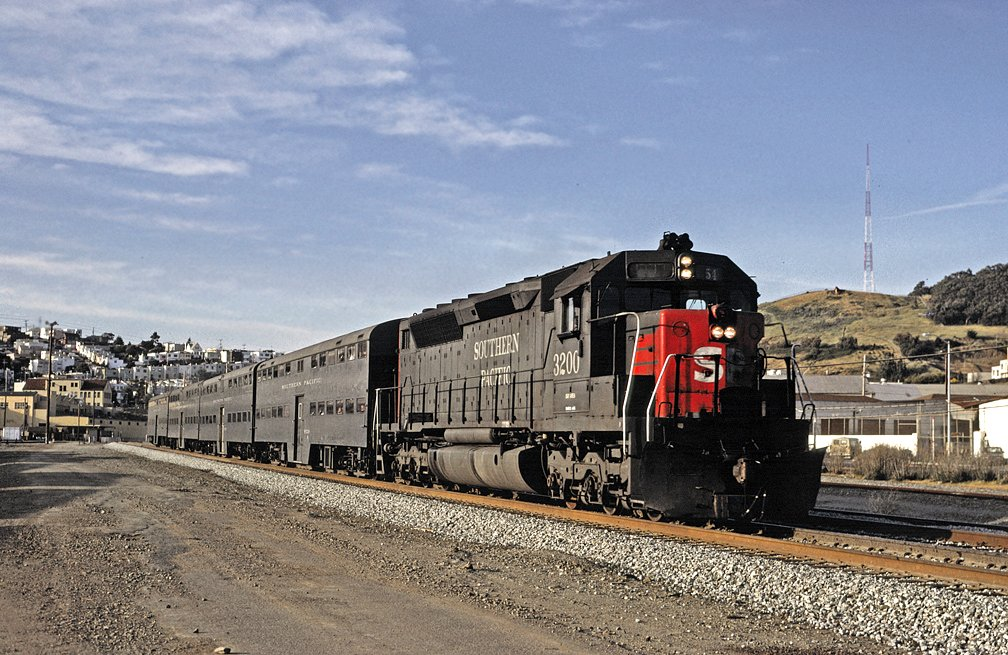
A Southern Pacific locomotive pulls a Peninsula Commute train past Bayshore in April 1985.

The original commuter railroad was built in 1863 under the authority of the San Francisco & San Jose Railroad; it was purchased by Southern Pacific (SP) in 1870.

SP double-tracked the line in 1904 and rerouted it via the Bayshore Cutoff. After 1945, ridership declined with the rise in automobile use; in 1977 SP petitioned the state Public Utilities Commission to discontinue the commuter operation because of ongoing losses. California legislators wrote Assembly Bill 1853 in 1977 to allow local transit districts along the line to make bulk purchases of tickets for resale at a loss, subsidizing commuters reliant on the Peninsula Commute until 1980; more importantly, the bill also authorized Caltrans to begin negotiating with SP to operate the passenger rail service and acquire the right-of-way between San Bruno and Daly City.

To preserve the commuter service, in 1980 Caltrans contracted with SP and began to subsidize the Peninsula Commute. Caltrans purchased new locomotives and rolling stock, replacing SP equipment in 1985. Caltrans also upgraded stations, added shuttle buses to nearby employers, and dubbed the operation CalTrain.

=== Joint Powers Board ===
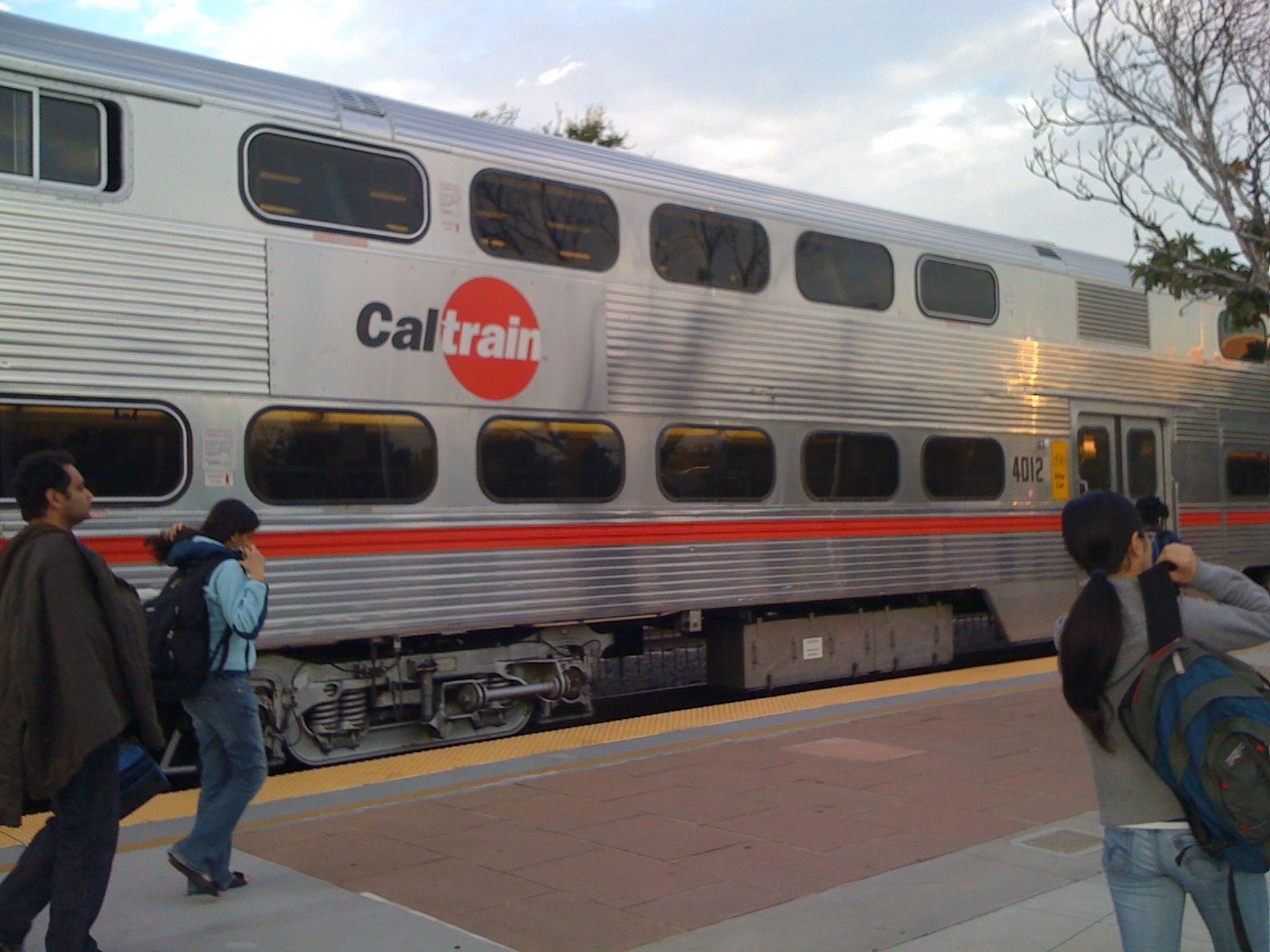
A Caltrain car manufactured by Nippon Sharyo

The Peninsula Corridor Joint Powers Board was formed in 1987 to manage the line. Subsequently, San Mateo and Santa Clara Counties commissioned Earth Metrics, Inc., to prepare an Environmental Impact Report on right-of-way acquisition and expansion of operations. With state and local funding, the PCJPB bought the railroad right of way between San Francisco and San Jose from SP in 1991. As SamTrans advanced most of the local funds used to purchased the right-of-way, it was also agreed that SamTrans would serve as the managing agency until San Francisco and Santa Clara Counties could repay their portions. The following year, PCJPB took responsibility for CalTrain operations and selected Amtrak as the contract operator. PCJPB extended the CalTrain service from San Jose to Gilroy, connecting to VTA light rail at Tamien station in San Jose.

In July 1995, CalTrain became accessible to passengers with wheelchairs, excepting 22nd Street station, which has no step-free access. Five months later, CalTrain increased the bicycle limit to 24 per train, making the service attractive to commuters in bicycle-friendly cities such as San Francisco and Palo Alto.

In July 1997, the current logo was adopted, and the official name became Caltrain, dropping the capitalized "T".

In 1998, the San Francisco Municipal Railway extended the N Judah line from Market Street to the San Francisco Caltrain station at 4th and King streets, providing a direct connection between Caltrain and the Muni Metro system. A year later, VTA extended its light rail service from north Santa Clara to the Mountain View station. Starting in 1999, Caltrain reconstructed several stations and upgraded tracks and level crossings under the "Ponderosa Project".

In June 2003, a passenger connection for the Bay Area Rapid Transit (BART) and Caltrain systems opened at Millbrae station just south of the San Francisco International Airport.

In 2008, Caltrain reached a then all-time high of 98 trains each weekday.

Caltrain announced on August 19, 2011, a staff recommendation to sign a five-year, $62.5 million contract with TransitAmerica Services, after taking proposals from three other firms, including Amtrak California, which had provided operating employees since 1992. The new operating contract was approved by the full Joint Powers Board at its scheduled September 1 meeting. TransitAmerica Services took over not only the conductor and engineer jobs on the trains, but also dispatching and maintenance of equipment, track, and right-of-way from Amtrak. On May 26, 2012, TransitAmerica took over full operations.

=== Baby Bullet service ===
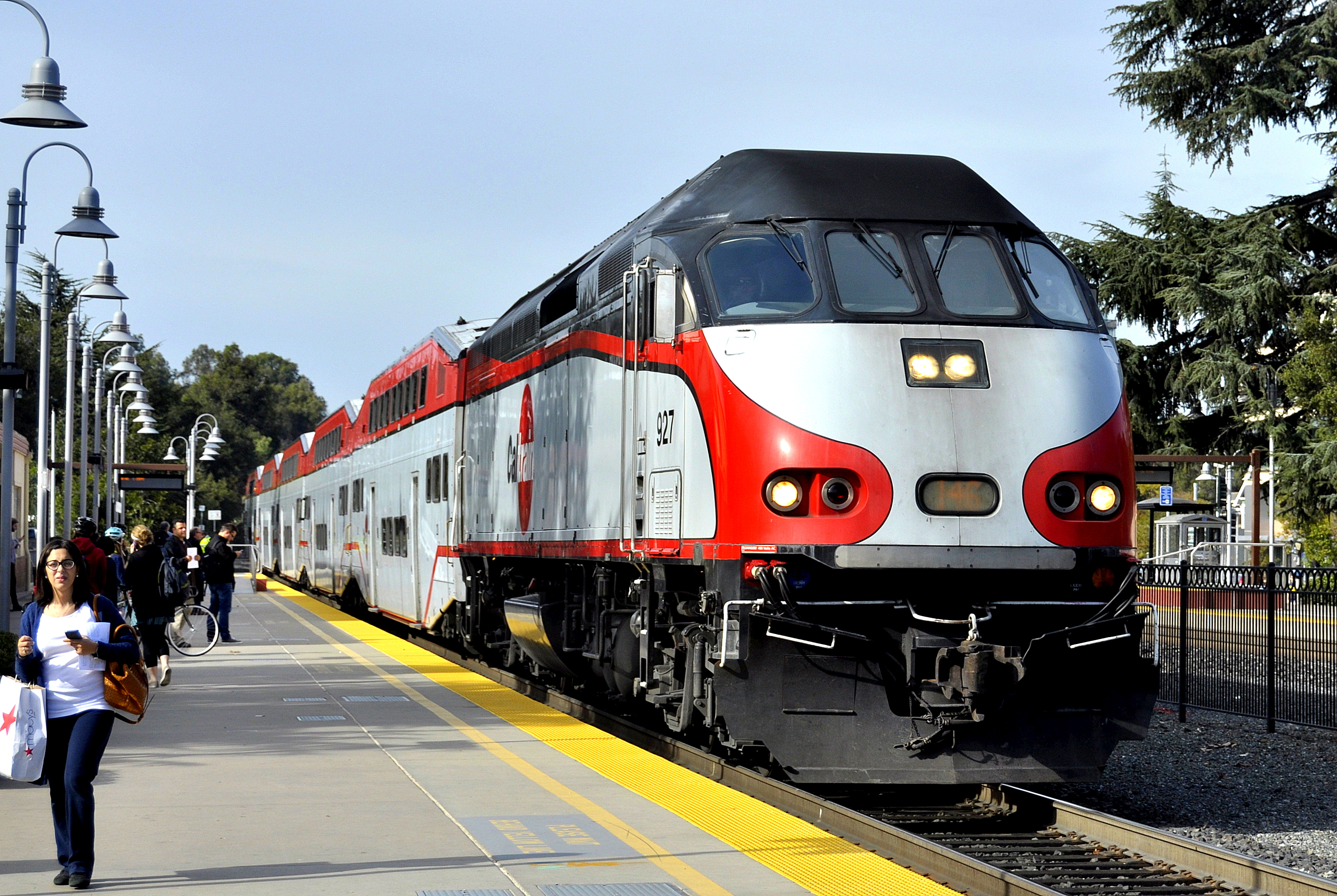
Baby Bullet service was originally provided by MPI MP36PH-3C locomotives; they have since been replaced by new electric train sets, but still see service on the South County Connector.

In June 2004, Caltrain finished its two-year CTX (Caltrain Express) project for a new express service called the Baby Bullet. The project entailed new bypass tracks in Brisbane and Sunnyvale as well as a new centralized traffic control system. The Baby Bullet trains reduced travel time by stopping at only four or five stations between San Francisco and San Jose Diridon station; the express trains could overtake local trains at the two locations (near Bayshore and Lawrence stations) where passing loops were added. Travel time for about 46.75 miles between San Francisco and San Jose is 57 minutes (four stops), 59 minutes (five stops) or 61 minutes (six stops), compared to 1 hour 30 minutes for local trains. The Baby Bullets have the same top speed of 79 mph (127 km/h) as other trains, but fewer stops save time. The CTX project included the purchase of new Bombardier BiLevel Coaches along with MPI MP36PH-3C locomotives. The Baby Bullets proved popular, but many riders had longer commutes on non-bullet trains, some of which would wait for Baby Bullet trains to pass.

=== Budget crises ===
In May 2005 Caltrain started a series of fare increases and schedule changes in response to a projected budget shortfall. The frequency of the popular Baby Bullet express trains was increased; two express trains were added in May and another ten were added in August. New Baby Bullet stops, Pattern B stops, were introduced. Another increase of $0.25 in basic fare came in January 2006.

On April 2, 2010, Caltrain announced the need to cut its services by around 50%, as it was required to cut $30 million from its $97 million budget because all three authorities that fund the line were facing financial problems themselves and $10 million a year in previous state funding had been cut. Revenues for both local and state agencies had been steadily declining, as well as ticket revenues at Caltrain itself, and had left all "beyond broke."

On January 1, 2011, Caltrain cut four midday trains but upgraded four weekend trains to Baby Bullet service as a pilot program. This reduced its schedule from 90 to 86 trains each weekday. At the same time, it raised fares $0.25 and continued to contemplate cutting weekday service to 48 trains during commute hours only. By April 2011, Caltrain's board had approved a budget with fare increases to take effect on July 1, 2011, and no service cuts. The budget gap would be closed with another $0.25 fare increase, a $1 parking fee increase to $4, and additional money from other transit agencies and the MTC.

On February 17, 2017, California State Senator Jerry Hill introduced SB 797, which would permit the Peninsula Corridor Joint Powers Board to submit a regional measure for sales tax increase of 1/8th of one cent to the voters in the three counties served by Caltrain. The regional measure would require a two-thirds majority (aggregated among the three counties) to pass, and would provide Caltrain with a dedicated revenue source estimated at $100 million per year. For comparison, in fiscal year 2016 (ending June 30, 2016), the operating expenses for Caltrain were $118 million, and farebox revenues were $87 million, leaving approximately $31 million in expenses to be funded by the PCJPB through its member agencies and county government contributions. SB 797 passed the California State Senate in May, and the State Assembly in September, and Governor Brown signed the bill into law in October.

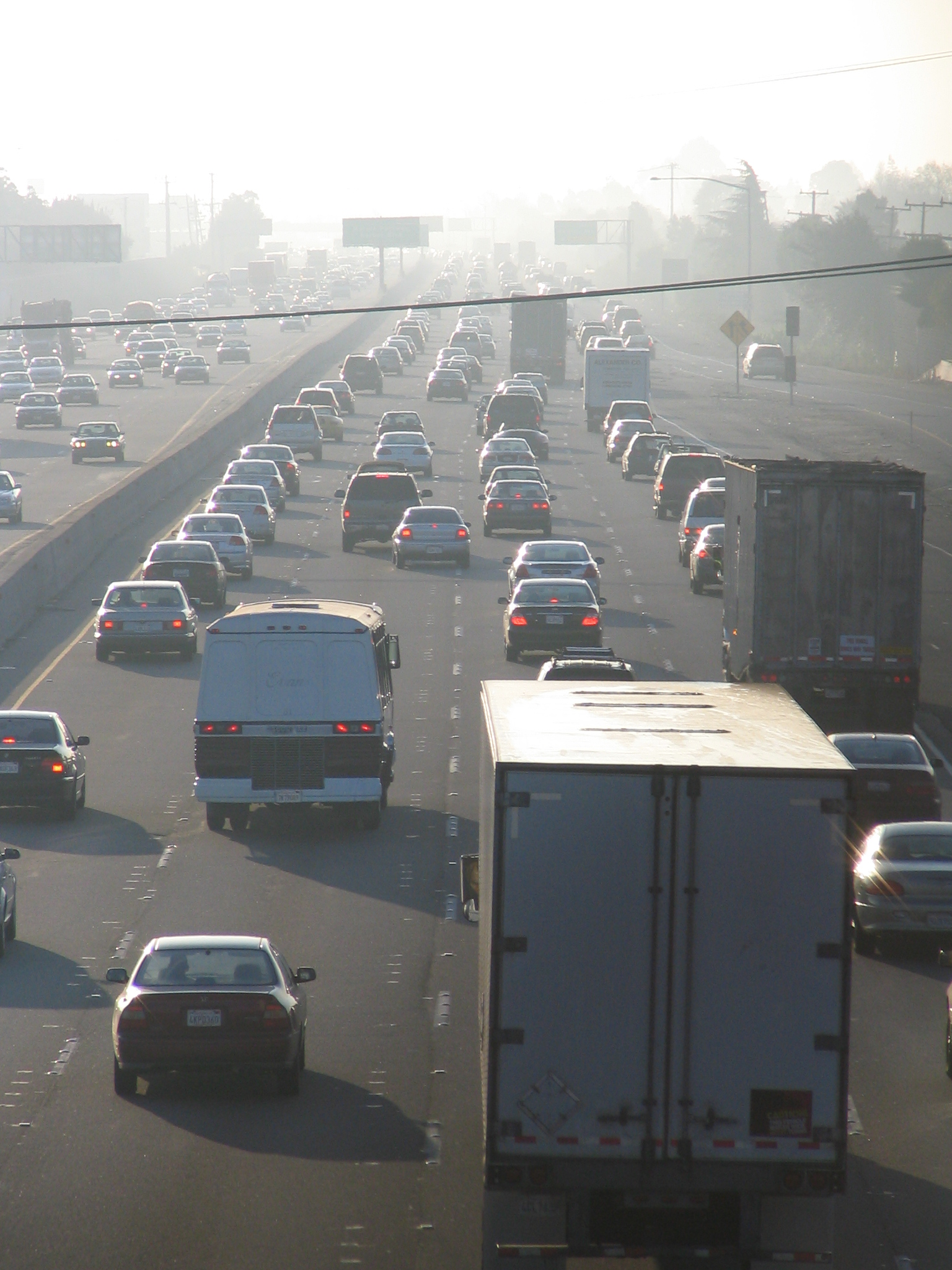
Caltrain parallels and provides an alternative to the congested Bayshore Freeway (US 101), seen here in San Mateo near Hillsdale Boulevard (2005)

Advocates for the increased tax cited its potential benefits to alleviate congestion along U.S. Route 101, which Carl Guardino quipped "has become so congested that we've changed its name to the '101 Parking Lot'." Detractors pointed to Caltrain's bureaucracy and stated fares should be increased to improve services instead. A poll of 1,200 voters in early May indicated support was strong enough to pass the sales tax increase, if the tax would result in expanding ridership capacity. The poll was sponsored by the Silicon Valley Leadership Group (SVLG), headed by Guardino, which predicted that daily ridership could rise to 250,000 with the improvements in service funded by the dedicated sales tax increase. Potential capital projects which could use the dedicated funding include additional electric multiple units (making electric trains 8-EMU consists, rather than 6-EMU), extended boarding platforms, and the proposed Downtown Rail Extension (now known as The Portal) to the Salesforce Transit Center. A dedicated tax was proposed in 2011, contemporaneously with the prior budget crisis, but polls at the time indicated insufficient support. After SVLG's May 2017 poll indicated strong support, they petitioned Hill to act.

By early 2020, the joint powers board was planning to propose a one-eighth-cent sales tax for voter approval later in the year, to provide an estimated $108 million of dedicated funding for the system, which currently relies on rider fares for 70% of its revenue. This funding would have enabled Caltrain to run 168 trains per weekday, with rush-hour headways of 10 minutes, with the completion of electrification in 2022. BART-like service levels were projected to increase ridership significantly.

In March 2020, Caltrain's ridership dropped by 95% due to the COVID-19 pandemic, resulting in losses of $9 million per month. The joint powers board recast the sales tax proposal as a way to keep the system afloat. Due to the COVID-19 measures and subsequent loss of approximately 75% of its ridership, Caltrain discontinued Baby Bullet service starting March 17, 2020. Two weeks later, due to continued loss of ridership, Caltrain further cut service from 92 to 42 trains per weekday, starting March 30. Average weekday ridership plummeted from approximately 65,000 (pre-pandemic) to 1,300. By June 15, service was increased to 70 trains per weekday, and limited (skip-stop) service was reinstated; later that month, ridership had recovered to 3,200 per weekday. In July, after the San Francisco Board of Supervisors initially declined to consider the ballot proposal, citing concerns about the system's governance structure, Caltrain officials warned that the agency would run out of operating funds and be forced to suspend service by the end of the year. In August, San Mateo County officials agreed to make Caltrain more independent from SamTrans in exchange for placing the sales tax on the ballot. In November 2020, Measure RR passed which created dedicated funding of a one-eighth cent sales tax. The schedule was adjusted again starting December 14, with slightly fewer weekday trains (68) but more frequent off-peak and weekend service to support essential workers.

The number of weekday trains returned to 70 starting March 22, 2021, and the schedule was adjusted to facilitate transfers to BART at Millbrae. Caltrain began operation with a new schedule that exceeds pre-pandemic service on August 30, 2021; there are 104 trains operated per weekday, including reinstated Baby Bullet service. Headways for popular stations are as low as 15 minutes during peak commute hours (6–9 a.m. and 4–7 p.m.) and 30 minutes throughout the day before 11 p.m. for most stations. The separate Saturday and Sunday schedules were consolidated into a single weekend schedule with 32 trains per weekend day. All stations have a maximum headway of 60 minutes, including weekends, except for a 90–120 minute gap between the earliest weekend trains. In addition, fares were cut in half for September. Gilroy service was increased to four weekday round trips on September 25, 2023.

Despite ridership increases after electrification, by 2026 Caltrain projected a $75 million annual budget deficit over the following 15 years. In April 2026, the agency indicated potential service reductions that would be necessary if a regional funding measure is not passed in the November 2026 elections. They could include closure of one-third of stations, elimination of late evening and weekend service, frequency reduction to one train per hour, and closure of segments of the service.

=== Modernization and electrification ===
The Caltrain Modernization Program electrified the main line between San Francisco and the San Jose Tamien station, allowing transition from diesel-electric locomotive power to electric rolling stock. Proponents said electrification would improve service times via faster acceleration, allow better scheduling and reduce air pollution and noise. Electrification would also allow future expansion to downtown San Francisco. Electrified vehicles require less maintenance, but electrification will increase required track maintenance by about the same dollar amount, at least initially. The plan called to electrify the system between San Francisco and San Jose Tamien station. Originally scheduled for completion by 2020, the first electric multiple unit services started on August 11, 2024, with full electrification achieved and diesel trains retired on September 21, 2024.

Electrification resulted in faster trip times thanks to better acceleration on the new electric multiple unit trains. A scheduled local train trip from San Jose Tamien to San Francisco was shortened from 115 minutes with a diesel train to 83 minutes with electric service, an improvement of 32 minutes. Electric express service added more stops but still improved trip times - a 7-stop diesel express train from San Jose Diridon to San Francisco was scheduled at 66 minutes, while a 10-stop electric express train went down to 59 minutes despite making more stops. A UC Berkeley study found electrification delivered significant air quality improvements both onboard trains and at stations, as well as the areas surrounding stations.

The electrification project between San Francisco and Tamien is the first phase, the second phase being from Tamien station to Gilroy. Cost, excluding electric rolling stock, for the first phase was estimated at $471 million (2006 dollars). By 2016, costs had increased to $1.7 billion. Notably, in 2021, Caltrain stated that the overall cost of electrification had risen to $2.44 billion. As part of the Caltrain Modernization Program and mandated by the federal government, positive train control (PTC) was installed along the route between San Francisco and San Jose by late 2015.

Caltrain planned to use lighter electric multiple units that do not comply with the Federal Railroad Administration (FRA) crashworthiness standards, but instead comply with the International Union of Railways (UIC) standards, on the electrified lines. The FRA granted Caltrain a waiver to operate these units, which were previously banned on mixed-use lines with other FRA-compliant rolling stock due to concerns over crashworthiness, after Caltrain submitted simulation data showing UIC-compliant rolling stock performed no worse or even better than FRA-compliant rolling stock in crashes. Caltrain plans to retain its newer diesel-electric rolling stock for use on the Dumbarton Extension and service south of Tamien.

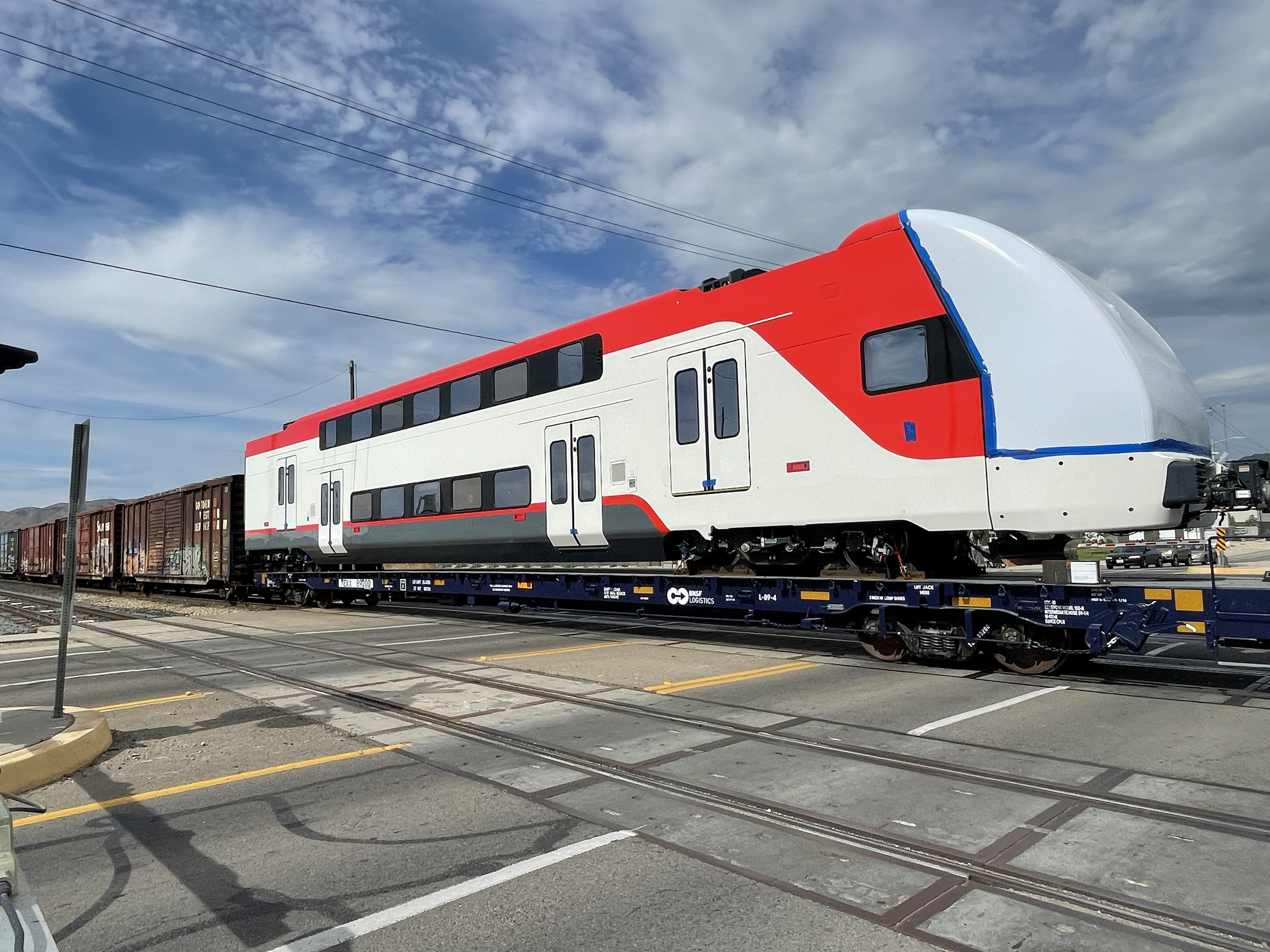
Stadler KISS for Caltrain near the U.S. assembly plant in Salt Lake City

Caltrain awarded the electrification and EMU contracts at the July 7, 2016, PCJPB board meeting to Balfour Beatty and Stadler Rail, respectively, signaling the start of modernization efforts that will make Caltrain more akin to rapid-transit services such as Bay Area Rapid Transit (BART) than traditional commuter services, and allow the future California High-Speed Rail trains to reach San Francisco utilizing Caltrain tracks. In August 2016, Caltrain ordered sixteen six-car double-decker Stadler KISS electric multiple unit sets from Stadler Rail. The price is $166m for the 16 units, or $551m including an option of 96 more EMU cars.

However, the plans for an electrified Caltrain were put in jeopardy in February 2017 by the Trump administration when US Secretary of Transportation Elaine Chao decided to indefinitely delay granting the federal funding for the Caltrain electrification project that had been approved by the Obama administration. One month later, in March 2017, the American Public Transportation Association (APTA) sent a letter to Secretary Chao calling the Caltrain delay "concerning." In more than two decades, the APTA wrote, "no project has failed to secure final signature after successfully meeting evaluation criteria." In February 2017, Caltrain fired Parsons Transportation Group and sued them for delays in designing the custom technologies necessary for the PTC system. They then went on to sign a contract with Wabtec, who would offer them the industry-standard PTC system.

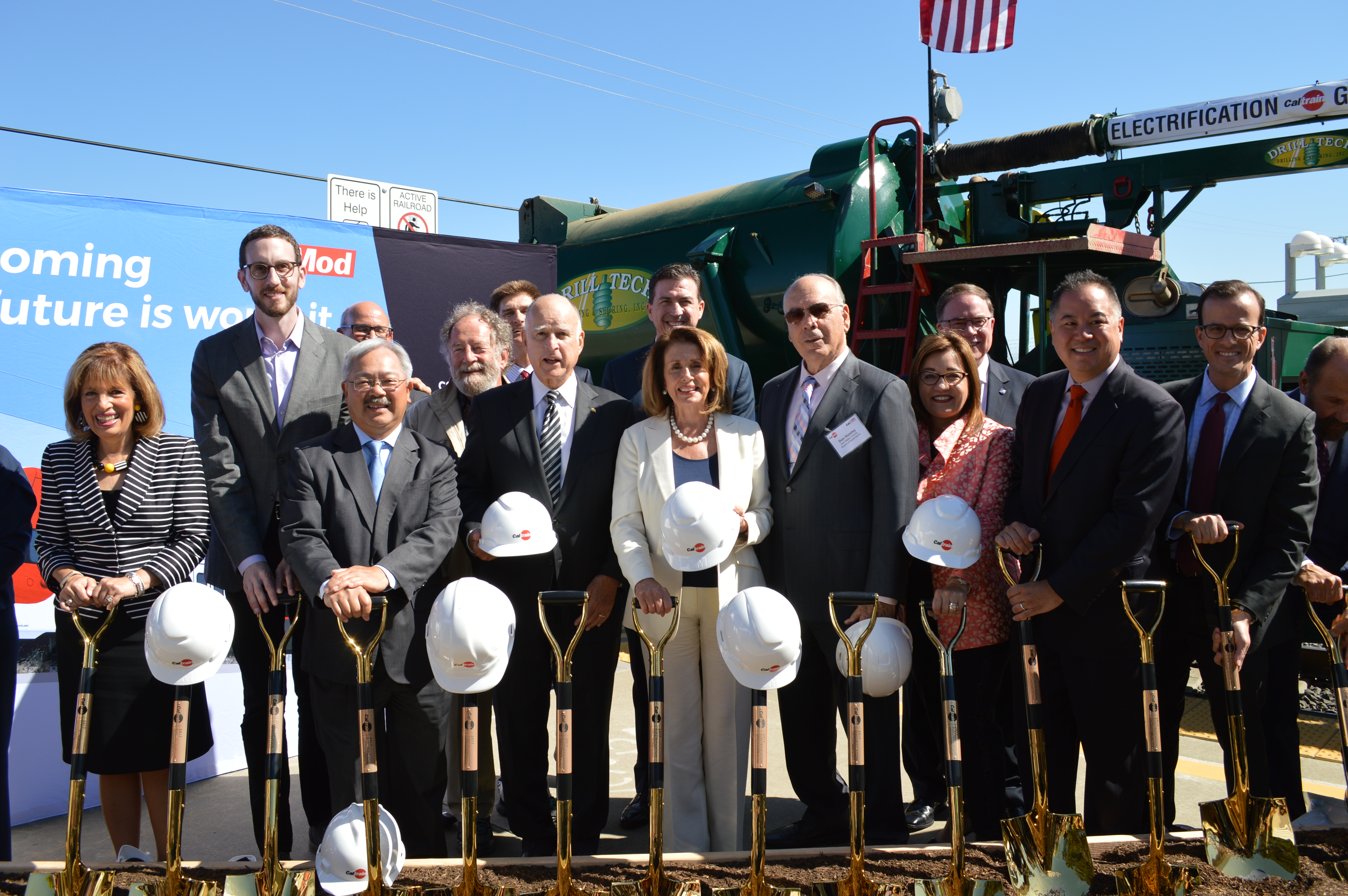
Groundbreaking for electrification project, July 21, 2017

On April 30, legislators in the United States Congress included $100 million for the Caltrain electrification project in the proposed 2017 federal spending bill, which was signed into law by President Trump on May 6. The $100 million represents the federal funding for fiscal year 2017 of the total $647 million grant, with the balance expected in future years. Secretary Chao claimed she could not sign the grant without the full grant being budgeted, which was disputed by Caltrain and both California Senators Dianne Feinstein and Kamala Harris. On May 22, the FTA announced its intent to sign the funding grant, restoring the final piece of funding for the electrification project. The official grant was finally signed on May 23, and Caltrain broke ground for the Peninsula Corridor Electrification Project on July 21, 2017, in a ceremony attended by local and state officials at the Millbrae station.

In December 2018, it was reported that Caltrain was again behind schedule in installing PTC for the rail corridor, and had requested a two-year extension. The Federal Railroad Administration certified Caltrain's PTC project in December 2020. The first electric trainset was shipped to the Transportation Technology Center for testing in February 2021. In June 2021, Caltrain announced that the start of revenue service with electric multiple units would be delayed to late 2024.

In February 2022, the last foundation required for the new overhead catenary system was completed, with the entire line planned to be energized by summer 2022. Testing of the line would then begin using a AEM-7 electric locomotive, with revenue service planned for 2024. On March 10, 2022, a southbound train struck a contractor's crane in San Bruno, injuring 13 people.

The last scheduled diesel trainset from San Jose to San Francisco on September 20, 2024

Caltrain began public operation of its electrified trainsets on August 11, 2024, with two trainsets, adding more each week until the full rollout of electric service between San Francisco and Tamien on September 21. As part of the transition, a new schedule was implemented. The new schedule provides for 104 trains on weekdays (52 in each direction) between San Francisco and San Jose Diridon, with local service running every 30 minutes, and alternating trains continuing to Tamien. During weekday rush hours, local service is supplemented by express (stopping only at 22nd Street, South San Francisco, Millbrae, San Mateo, Hillsdale, Redwood City, Palo Alto, Mountain View and Sunnyvale) and limited-stop trains (running express between San Francisco and Redwood City, then local between Redwood City and San Jose). Diesel trains continue to be used for South County Connector service between San Jose and Gilroy, with 4 trains in each direction, with these trains scheduled to provide timed cross-platform transfers to and from limited-stop or express electric trains at Diridon. Weekend service was doubled to 66 trains (33 in each direction), with local service running every 30 minutes between San Francisco and San Jose Diridon, and alternating trains continuing to Tamien.

=== Grade separation ===
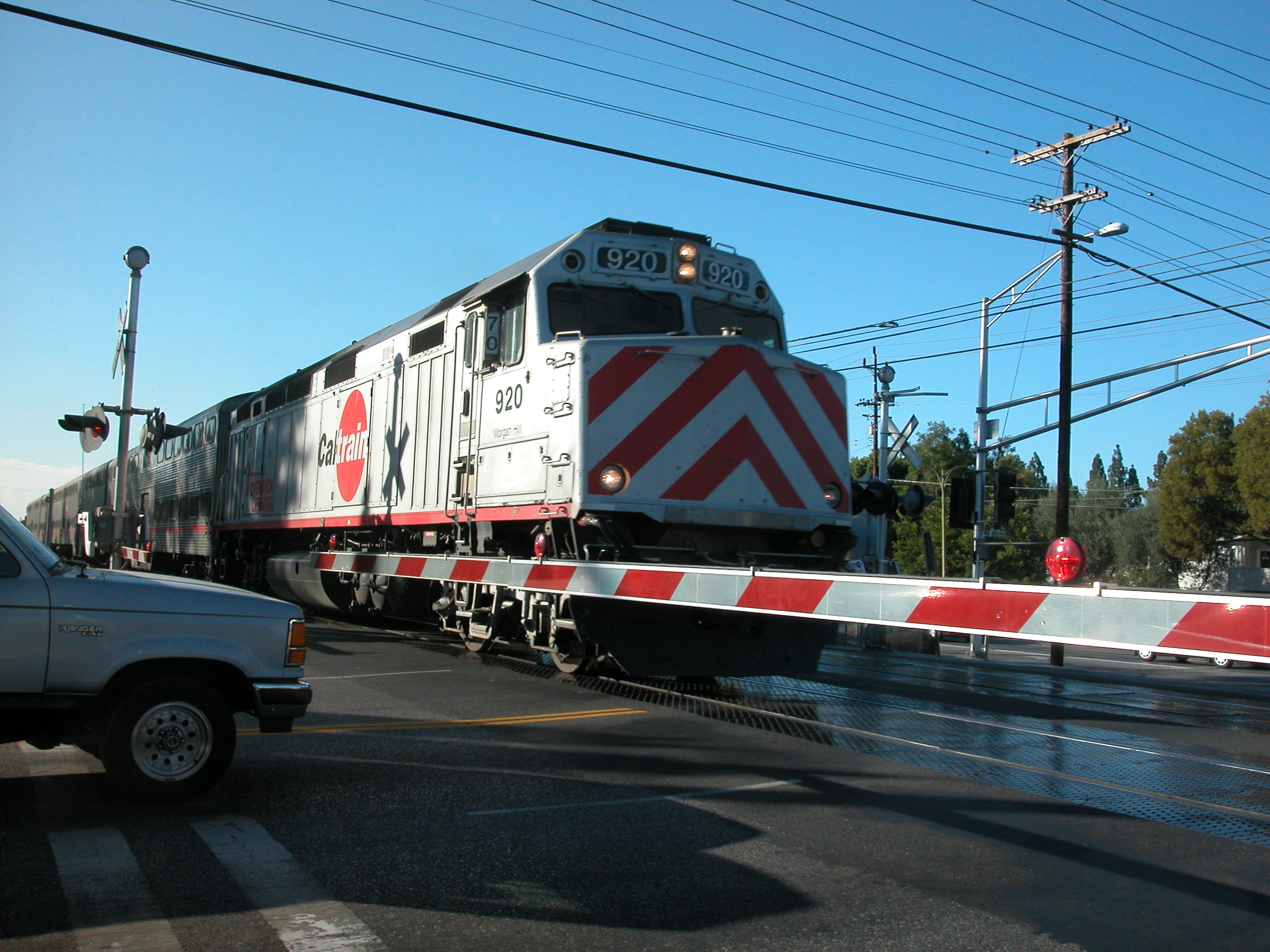
At-grade crossing at Meadow Drive in Palo Alto, California (2005)

As of February 2021, there were 41 vehicular at-grade crossings remaining along the PCJPB-owned right-of-way from San Francisco to Tamien:

- 2 in San Francisco: Mission Bay Dr, 16th St
- 29 in San Mateo County
  - South San Francisco: Linden Ave
  - San Bruno: Scott St
  - Millbrae: Center St
  - Burlingame: Broadway, Oak Grove, North Lane, Howard Ave, Bayswater, Peninsula (Note: Located on the border of Burlingame and San Mateo)
  - San Mateo: Peninsula, Villa Terrace, Bellevue, 1st, 2nd, 3rd, 4th, 5th, 9th
  - Redwood City: Whipple, Brewster, Broadway, Maple, Main, Chestnut
  - Atherton: Fair Oaks Ln, Watkins
  - Menlo Park: Encinal, Glenwood, Oak Grove, Ravenswood
- 10 in Santa Clara County
  - Palo Alto: Palo Alto, Churchill, Meadow, Charleston
  - Mountain View: Rengstorff Ave, Castro St
  - Sunnyvale: Mary, Sunnyvale
  - San Jose: Auzerais, West Virginia

In addition, there are 28 more at-grade crossings in Santa Clara County along the UP-owned right-of-way between Tamien and Gilroy, including crossings at Skyway Drive, Branham Lane, Chynoweth Avenue in south San Jose.

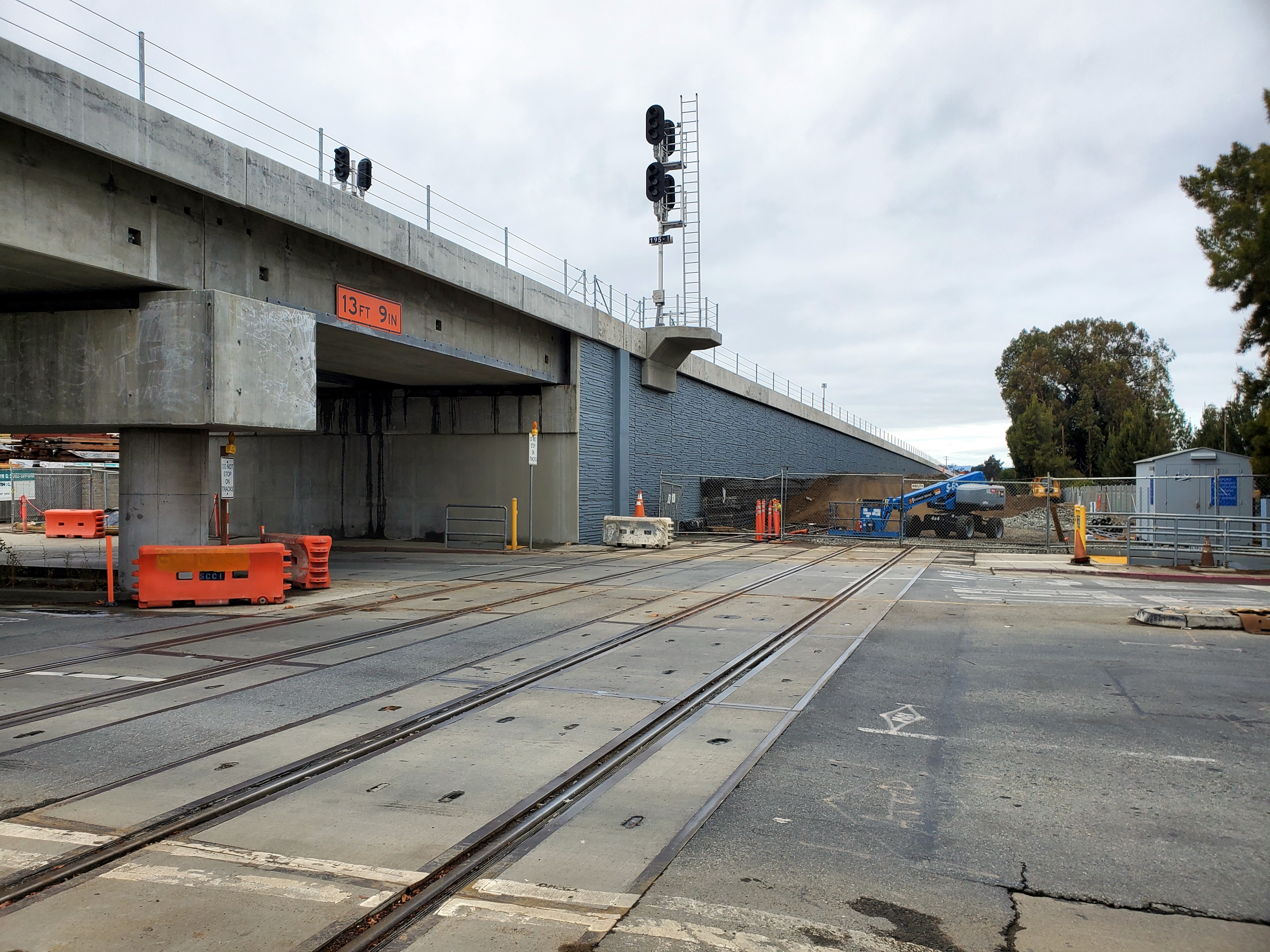
Grade separation next to old tracks crossing 25th Avenue in San Mateo, California (2020)

The first grade separation project under PCJPB was completed in 1994, building a flyover for Oyster Point Boulevard in South San Francisco. Additional grade separations were completed in 1995 (Fifth Ave in North Fair Oaks, depressed under rails), 1996 (Millbrae Ave in Millbrae, elevated above rails), and 1999 (Jefferson Ave in Redwood City, depressed under rails). Grade separation projects near the Belmont and San Carlos stations (for Ralston, Harbor, Holly, Brittan, and Howard) were completed in 1995, and 2000; these were "hybrid" crossings, executed as a combination of road depression and rails elevated on berms. The San Bruno station reconstruction was completed in 2014, separating the crossings at San Bruno, San Mateo, and Angus by elevating the rails on a long, curved berm. In 2021, a similar hybrid grade separation project (25th, 28th, and 31st Avenues in San Mateo) was completed near the Hillsdale station, which was relocated north during the grade separation.

In 2018, gates were down for an average of approximately 11 minutes at each crossing during a typical peak weekday commute hour. The anticipated increase in rail traffic resulting from the completion of PCEP and implementation of CAHSR will result in additional road traffic delays for the remaining at-grade crossings along the Peninsula Corridor.

== Proposed plans ==
=== Integration with California High-Speed Rail ===
The Caltrain line from Gilroy to San Francisco is part of the planned route of the California High-Speed Rail line. With the adaptation of the preferred alternative in July 2019 on the San Jose to Gilroy HSR section, dedicated HSR tracks are planned south and east of Gilroy station, while CAHSR trains would use a "blended" service, sharing tracks with Caltrain between San Francisco and Gilroy. Blended service CAHSR trains would travel at speeds up to 110 miles per hour (180 km/h) between Gilroy and San Francisco, and higher HSR speeds up to 220 miles per hour (350 km/h) south and east of Gilroy.

=== Downtown San Francisco extension ===
A 1.3 mi (2.1 km) tunnel has been proposed to extend Caltrain from its north end in San Francisco at 4th and King to the newly built Salesforce Transit Center, closer to the job center of San Francisco and BART, Muni, Transbay AC Transit buses, and long-distance buses. As of 2012, only the structural "train box" below the Transbay Terminal had been funded and was being built. In April 2012, the Metropolitan Transportation Commission decided to make the remainder of the $2.5 billion extension its top priority for federal funding. The extension would also serve the California High-Speed Rail system.

An alternative proposal, by then-Mayor Ed Lee, would see the existing terminal and trains yards demolished, along with Interstate 280 in Mission Bay, and replaced with infill housing. Caltrain and high-speed rail would be extended to the Transbay Terminal in a new tunnel under Third Street.

In April 2018, the alternative alignment through Mission Bay was rejected in favor of a revised alignment under Pennsylvania Avenue. The new alignment would ultimately join the original alignment near 4th and King station while tunneling under Pennsylvania Avenue from near 25th Street. As of 2023, the revised extension is projected to cost $6.7 billion and may not open for service until 2032.

=== Dumbarton extension ===
Caltrain has been chosen to provide commuter rail service on a to-be-rebuilt Dumbarton Rail Corridor across the San Francisco Bay between the Peninsula and Alameda County in the East Bay. This project would add four stations to the Caltrain system: Union City, Fremont-Centerville, Newark, and Menlo Park/East Palo Alto. The two obsolete swing bridges along the corridor would be replaced. Dumbarton Rail was scheduled to start construction in 2009 after a 30-month environmental review and begin service in 2012. SamTrans, one of Caltrain's member agencies, already owns the right-of-way for the Dumbarton Rail Bridge. The bridge has not been used since 1982, when it was still owned by Southern Pacific, and about 33% of the bridge collapsed due to an arson fire in 1998. However, the project's estimated cost doubled between 2004 and 2006, to US$600 million, and is financially problematic. In January 2009, the Metropolitan Transportation Commission instead applied the funds to the BART Warm Springs Extension project in Fremont, delaying the Dumbarton rail project for at least a decade.

=== South of Gilroy extension ===
Potential restoration of Del Monte-like service to Monterey had been identified as early as the Caltrans 1984–89 Rail passenger development plan. Amtrak declined to operate such service, but operations under Southern Pacific (by then running state-subsidized services) were studied, and ridership forecasts were developed. Extensions to Hollister have been proposed since at least 2003.

Caltrain was approached by the Transportation Agency for Monterey County (TAMC) to extend service south of Gilroy into Monterey County. A draft environmental impact report stated the lack of public transportation between Monterey County and the Bay Area has resulted in increased private commuter vehicle traffic. Traffic on U.S. Route 101 was projected to rise by up to 56% in 2020 compared to 1998 levels, resulting in unstable traffic flow from the Salinas city limits to the Santa Clara County line as a result.

The concept of a Caltrain extension to Monterey County has been considered since at least 1996, with the cities of Salinas and Watsonville considering rail station improvements and construction between 1996 and 1998, culminating in a TAMC-sponsored Extension of Caltrain Commuter Service to Monterey County Business Plan in 2000. The proposed extension would create new stations and stops in Pajaro (serving Watsonville in adjacent Santa Cruz County at an estimated cost of US$6,585,000 (equivalent to $10,517,000 in 2025)) and Castroville (at an estimated cost of US$11,150,000 (equivalent to $17,807,000 in 2025)) before terminating at the existing Salinas Amtrak station with Coast Starlight service. The Salinas station would be rebuilt as an intermodal station to connect commuter rail with Monterey-Salinas Transit buses. A layover yard would be added to accommodate Caltrain crews and maintenance, and the total cost of the Salinas improvements was estimated at US$39,705,000 (equivalent to $63,411,000 in 2025). The cost of operating commuter rail from the anticipated start of service until 2030 was estimated at US$64,900,000 (equivalent to $103,649,000 in 2025) for two daily round trips, including an expansion to four round trips daily within ten years.

This project depends on state and federal funding availability, a possible local sales tax measure, and an agreement with Union Pacific, the owner of the Salinas-to-Gilroy tracks and right-of-way. This project is managed by TAMC, who released the Final Environment Impact Report (EIR) for this project in 2006. This would complement another plan to re-establish rail service last provided by Southern Pacific's Del Monte Express which operated between Monterey and San Francisco.

In 2009, Caltrain requested that TAMC approach other train operators. TAMC subsequently opened discussions with the Capitol Corridor Joint Powers Authority and the Caltrans Division of Rail to extend Capitol Corridor service south from San Jose to Salinas using the same routing and stations. The switch to Capitol Corridor was cited as an advantage, since CCJPA had experience with commuter trains sharing service on Union Pacific-owned freight right-of-way. Two Capitol Corridor trains would originate from Salinas in the mornings and run through to San Jose and on to Sacramento, with two evening trains making the return trip south to Salinas.

By 2016, plans had shifted in favor of Amtrak California's Capitol Corridor to be the service extended to Salinas station. However, with the awarding of Road Repair and Accountability Act funds in 2018, it was revealed that Caltrain again would operate to Salinas as the first commuter rail service with Capitol Corridor service to follow later. As of March 2020, two daily Caltrain round trips were planned to begin in 2022 after the completion of the Salinas layover facility and trackwork at Gilroy. Future phases are proposed to add stations at Pajaro/Watsonville and Castroville, with the potential for up to six daily round trips.

=== Oakdale infill station ===
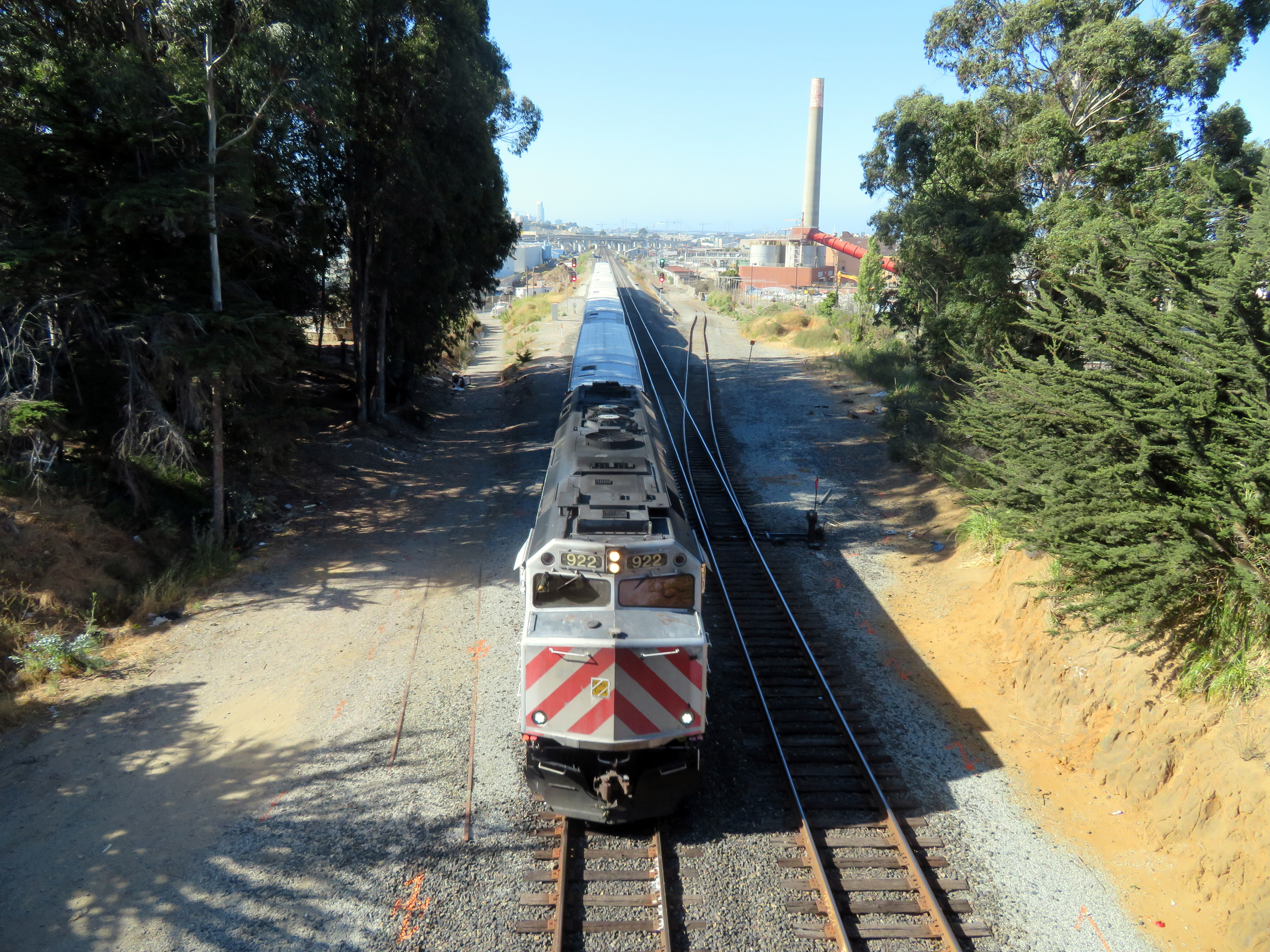
A southbound train passing the proposed station site (June 2018); the Quint Street Lead can be seen branching east from the northbound mainline.

A study from 1988 evaluated replacing the Paul Avenue station with a new station to the north, at either Williams, Palou, or Evans, as part of the effort to relocate the home port for USS Missouri (BB-63) to the Hunters Point Shipyard, and concluded that with the completion of the Downtown Rail Extension (now known as The Portal), daily ridership could increase to 2,400. However, without the Downtown Extension, ridership would be limited to less than 100. The 1988 study concluded the preferred site was at Evans Avenue.

The Bayview Hunters Point Community Revitalization Concept Plan (March 2002) identified the Oakdale-Palou area as the community's preferred location for the Caltrain station. With the completion of the Caltrain Express project, service to Paul Avenue was reduced and the station was closed in 2005. A feasibility study that year proposed a replacement station just north of Oakdale Avenue, next to the City College of San Francisco Southeast Campus in Bayview, 1.0 mile (1.6 km) north of the former Paul Avenue station, connecting with multiple bus lines. The station would be near the Quint Street Lead, which is used by freight trains moving east to the Intermodal Freight Rail Cargo Transfer Facility near Piers 90–96. A follow-up study in 2014 predicted daily ridership of around 2,350.

The Southeast Rail Station Study (SERSS) was released in June 2022 and was endorsed by the San Francisco Planning Commission on July 14. SERSS recommended a new Bayview Station should be located between Oakdale and Jerrold, over alternatives at Evans or at Williams.

Near the proposed station, the Caltrain line is grade-separated from Oakdale (which passes over the rail line) and Quint. Prior to 2016, the rail line was carried over Quint on a steel bridge originally constructed for the Bayshore Cutoff in the early 1900s. In preparation for a new Oakdale station, the bridge over Quint was removed on April 30 and replaced by a berm completed in July 2016, which severed Quint between Oakdale and Jerrold. A new road has been proposed to reconnect Quint to Jerrold on land belonging to Union Pacific, west of the tracks.

== Infrastructure and service ==
=== Right of way ===
Bay Area regional commuter rail map; excludes metro (BART) and light rail (Muni Metro and VTA Light Rail) services

The Caltrain right of way between San Francisco and Tamien stations is owned and maintained by its operating agency, the Peninsula Corridor Joint Powers Board (PCJPB). PCJPB purchased the right of way from Southern Pacific (SP) in 1991, while SP maintained rights to inter-city passenger and freight trains. In exchange SP granted PCJPB rights to operate up to 6 trains per day between Tamien and Gilroy stations, later increased to 10 trains per day on a deal with SP's successor Union Pacific (UP) in 2005. Three round-trip freight trains operate daily over the line.

Law enforcement services are provided by a division of the San Mateo County Sheriff's Office, under contract with PCJPB.

=== Stations ===
The system has 30 stations. 28 stations are served daily, one (Broadway) is served on weekends only, the other (College Park) is served during Bellarmine College Preparatory's commute times on weekdays only. San Francisco is the northern terminus of the system, while Gilroy is the southern terminus. However, most trains originate and terminate at Tamien. The five southernmost stations—Capitol, Blossom Hill, Morgan Hill, San Martin, and Gilroy—are served only on weekdays during commute times in the peak direction, going toward San Francisco in the morning and toward Gilroy in the afternoon. Twelve stations were served by the express train service known as Baby Bullet, inaugurated in 2004 and discontinued in 2024. Santa Clara station is not long enough to accommodate six-car trains without minor service impacts. Seven stations (Millbrae, Burlingame, San Carlos, Menlo Park, Palo Alto, Santa Clara and San Jose Diridon) are listed on the National Register of Historic Places.

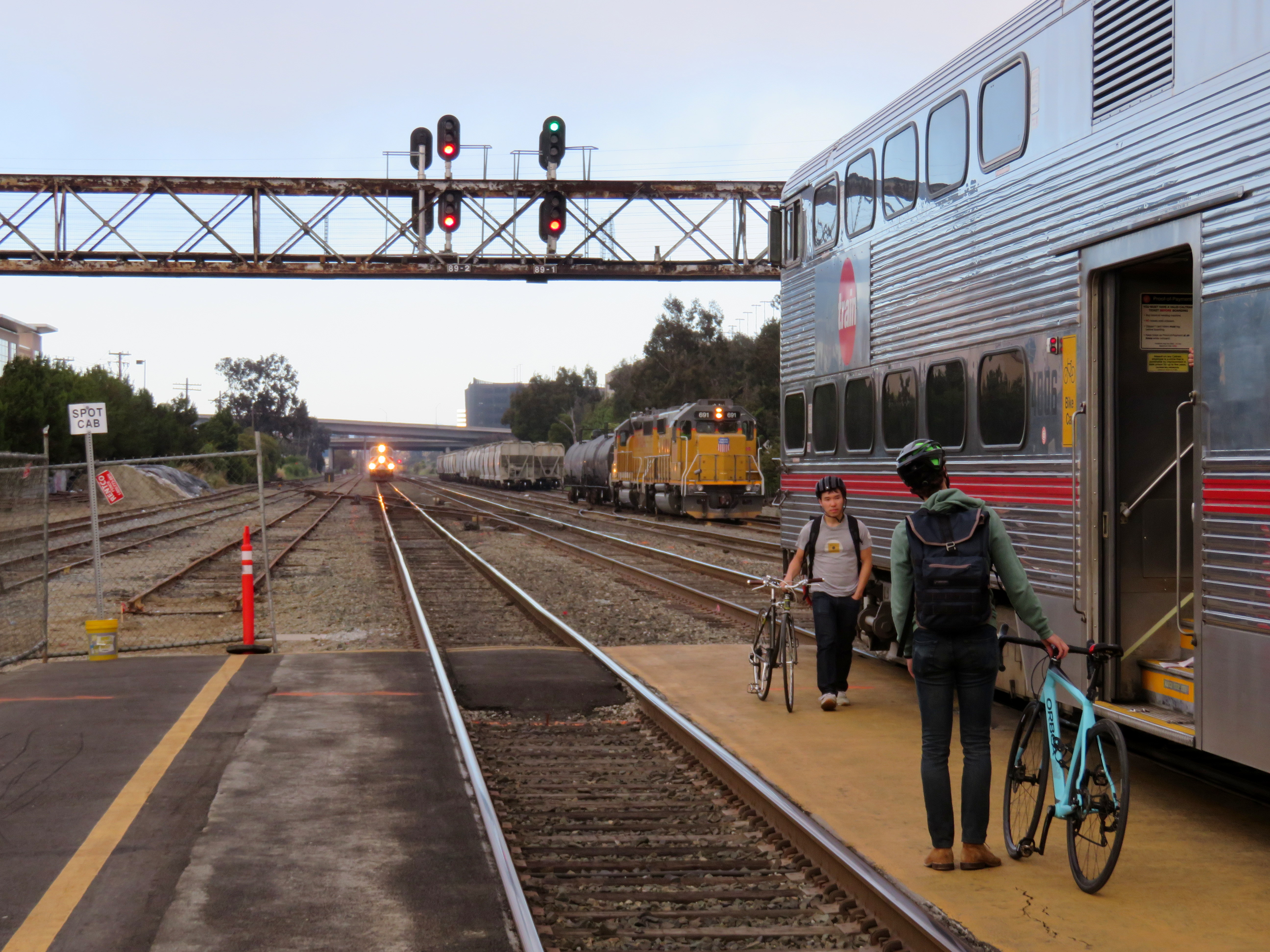
A southbound train holds outside the old South San Francisco station while passengers board a northbound train on the narrow island platform in July 2018.

The Southern Pacific Railroad originally built many stations with a side platform on the west side of the tracks to serve southbound trains, plus a narrow island platform between tracks to serve northbound trains. To protect northbound passengers from being struck by southbound trains, Caltrain implemented a "hold-out rule" (GCOR 6.30): if a train is stopped for passengers, an approaching train on another track must wait outside the station. This rule caused numerous delays, especially after the Caltrain Express project added Baby Bullet trains that pass through many stations without stopping. Most stations have been rebuilt (often as part of larger projects) with side platforms or wider island platforms, thus avoiding the hold-out rule. They have included Redwood City in 1995; San Carlos in the late 1990s; Mountain View, San Mateo, and Menlo Park in 2000; Sunnyvale in 2002; Millbrae in 2003; Hillsdale in 2005; Burlingame and California Avenue in 2008, Santa Clara in 2012, and South San Francisco in 2021. Weekday service at Broadway and Atherton was eliminated in 2005 due to the hold-out rule, while College Park has only limited service. Atherton station was closed altogether in December 2020.

=== Services ===
The current services became effective on September 21, 2024:

Service	Train numbering scheme	Notes
Local	1xx	All stops between San Francisco and San Jose, including service to Tamien on alternating trains and service to College Park on two trips.
Limited	4xx	Skip-stop service in the northern part of the route with local service for stations south of Redwood City.
Express	5xx	Limited stop service, completing the San Jose to San Francisco trip in 59 minutes.
Weekend Local	6xx	All stops between San Francisco and San Jose, including service to Tamien on alternating trains, service to Broadway, and service to Stanford on game days
South County Connector	8xx	4× daily weekday only diesel service between Gilroy and San Jose with timed cross-platform transfers to and from Limited or Express trains.

=== Maintenance and operations facility ===
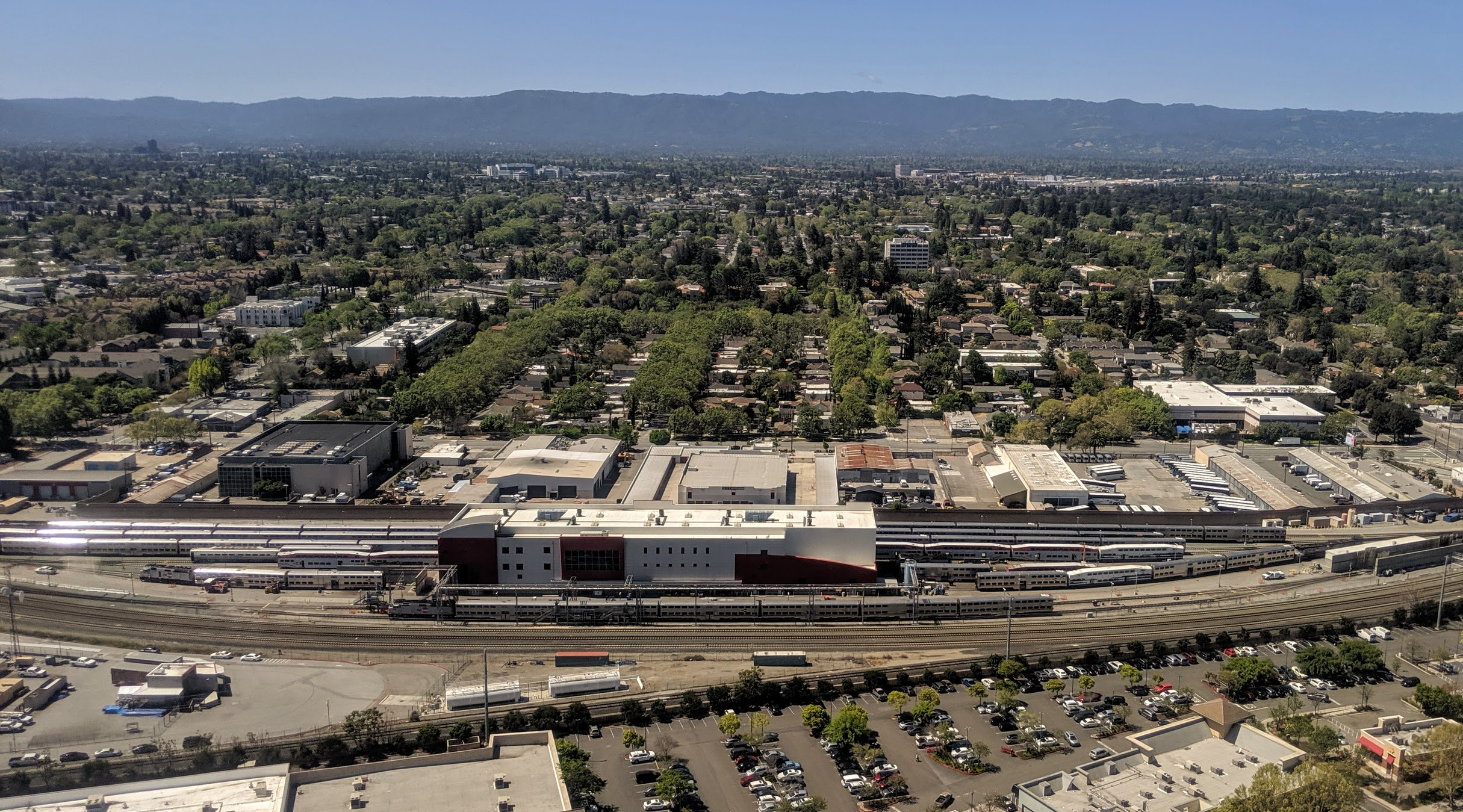
Caltrain Centralized Equipment Maintenance and Operations Facility

The Centralized Equipment Maintenance and Operations Facility is the train maintenance yard and facility serving Caltrain, north of San Jose Diridon station in San Jose. The US$140 million maintenance station began construction in 2004 and opened on September 29, 2007. It consolidates much of Caltrain's maintenance and operations into one location.

== Operations ==
Caltrain annual statistics
Year	Finances (Note: Fiscal year ends on June 30. Reported in Year of Expenditure $×1,000.)			Weekday Ridership (Note: Since November 2023, passenger counts based on fare media.)		Refs.
Year	Passenger Fare Revenue	Operating Expenses	Farebox Recovery Ratio	Passengers	Bicycles (Note: Only includes bicycles physically brought onto the train, not those left at the station.)	Refs.
1997	—N/a			24,597	—N/a	
1998	—N/a			26,794	—N/a	
1999	—N/a			26,028	—N/a	
2000	—N/a			29,728	—N/a	
2001	—N/a			33,691	—N/a	
2002 (Note: CTX project started in July 2002)	—N/a			29,178	—N/a	
2003	19,430	59,854	32%	25,577	—N/a	
2004 (Note: Baby Bullet service began June 2004)	18,427	63,611	29%	23,947	1,614	
2005	21,968	70,098	31%	26,533	1,860	
2006	28,845	72,576	40%	29,760	2,271	
2007	33,058	77,531	43%	31,507	2,334	
2008	38,399	86,958	44%	34,611	2,382	
2009	43,272	90,267	48%	36,232	2,890	
2010	42,732	88,609	48%	34,120	2,659	
2011	49,026	95,628	51%	37,779	3,664	
2012	59,891	101,175	59%	42,354	4,243	
2013	68,767	107,052	64%	47,060	4,910	
2014	82,145	115,761	71%	52,611	5,874	
2015	83,351	120,110	69%	58,245	6,207	
2016	86,959	117,843	74%	62,416	5,520	
2017	92,429	132,634	70%	62,190 (Note: Revised methodology to count "Average Mid-Weekday Ridership" (AMWR) for 2018 by averaging two mid-weekday (Tuesdays and Thursdays) counts per train. Using the revised methodology provides a count of 64,114 for 2017.)	5,216 (Note: 5,584 using "Average Mid-Weekday Bike Ridership" (AMWBR) methodology analogous to AMWR.)	
2018	97,050	132,925	73%	65,095 (Note: Starting from 2018, counts performed as AMWR.)	5,919 (Note: Starting from 2018, counts performed as AMWBR.)	
2019	102,668	147,327	70%	63,597	5,506	
2020	76,094	157,023	48%	—N/a (Note: No ridership count conducted due to COVID-19 pandemic in California)		
2021	32,440	170,847	19%	—N/a		
2022	33,236	174,388	21%	—N/a	—N/a	
2023	43,330	173,287	25%	—N/a	—N/a	
2024	46,896	194,238	25%	21,784	—N/a	
2025	58,720	225,254	26%	29,754	—N/a	
Notes

The Peninsula Corridor Joint Powers Board purchased the right of way between San Francisco and San Jose for $212 million from Southern Pacific in 1991 (equivalent to $501 million in 2025 adjusted for inflation). Trackage rights with Union Pacific limit service south of Tamien to up to five round trips per weekday (four daily round trips operate as of 2024).

=== Operating expenses and farebox recovery ===
The operating expenses for fiscal year 2021 were $170,847,000. The fare revenue was $32,440,000, making the farebox recovery ratio 19.1%. Operating expenses for fiscal year 2022 rose to $174,388,000 while fare revenue rose to $33,236,000, marking a modest gain in the farebox recovery ratio to 21%, still less than a third of pre-pandemic levels.

=== Ridership ===
Caltrain ridership more than doubled between 2005 and 2015. Ridership growth has been linked to the expansion of businesses near Caltrain stations, changing attitudes toward commuting by car, and the expansion of Caltrain services, including additional trains and the introduction of Baby Bullet express service.

=== Performance ===
According to the Rail and the California Economy study published in 2017, Caltrain Baby Bullet trains operate with a 95% on-time performance, defined as making stops within ten minutes of published schedules. In addition, Caltrain carries over 4,500 people per hour in each direction, equivalent to two freeway lanes in each direction. At current ridership levels, Caltrain directly removes 200 t (200 long tons; 220 short tons) of carbon dioxide emissions per day, displacing the equivalent of 10,000 vehicles per day, not counting any ancillary benefit from improved traffic flow resulting from reduced congestion.

== Ticketing ==
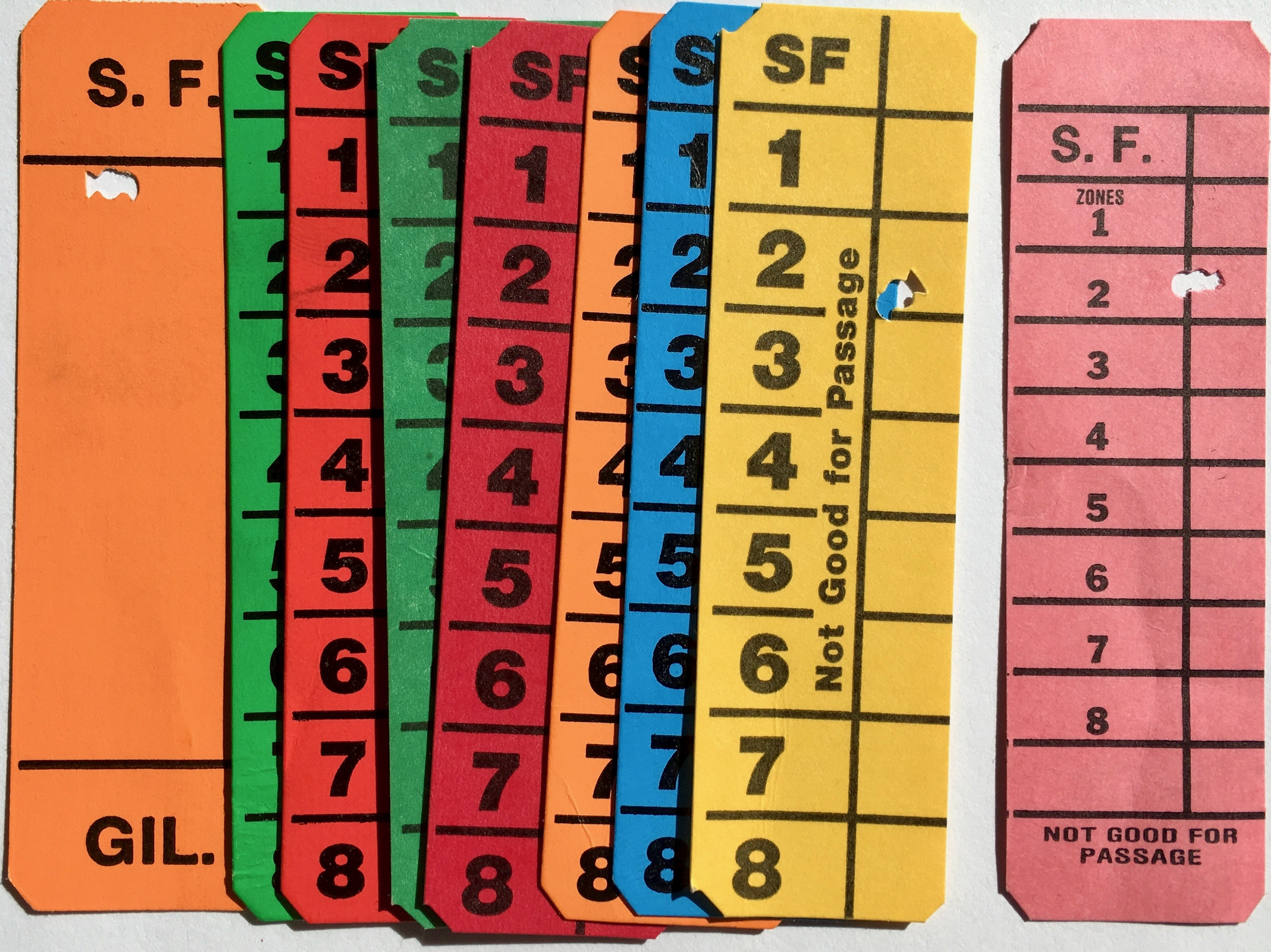
Seat checks used to verify fare payment in the 1990s

Caltrain operates as a proof-of-payment system. Each rider must buy a ticket prior to boarding the train that may or may not be checked during the trip. Tickets can be purchased at ticket vending machines located at all stations, as well as on the Caltrain app. Ticket windows located at San Jose Diridon and Fourth and King were closed in 2005.

One-way tickets expire four hours after purchase, but round-trip tickets ("day passes") are good for unlimited rides within their zone limit until the last train of the day. A joint adult Caltrain/VTA Day Pass, valid through Zone 3 and intended for service to Levi's Stadium, costs an additional $6 and covers fares on VTA buses and light rail, with the exception of VTA Express service. A Zone Upgrade may be purchased to augment a valid one-way ticket, day pass, or monthly pass at $2 per zone, valid for four hours after purchase and in one direction only. Discounted 8-ride tickets and monthly passes are available only with a Clipper card. Caltrain eliminated sales of the 8-ride ticket as of October 1, 2017; existing 8-ride tickets would be honored through the end of October. Seniors (aged 65 years and older), children (aged 17 years or younger), disabled, and Medicare card holders are eligible for a discounted fare at approximately half price (varies depending on the ticket).

=== Zone fare structure ===
Caltrain stations are split into six zones. Zone 1 comprises all stations in San Francisco, plus South San Francisco and San Bruno stations in San Mateo County. Zone 2 comprises most stations in San Mateo County. Zone 3 comprises stations in northern Santa Clara County, plus Menlo Park station in San Mateo County. Zone 4 comprises stations in central Santa Clara County. Zones 5 and 6, which are used only during rush hour, comprise stations in southern Santa Clara County.

Fares for Caltrain service are based on the number of zones traveled, which is considered to be the number of zones "touched" between the origin and destination. For instance, a passenger that boards at a Zone 1 station and departs at a Zone 1 station is considered to travel within one zone. A passenger that boards at a Zone 2 station and departs at a Zone 4 station is considered to travel within three zones (Zones 2, 3, and 4). When purchasing a ticket from the station ticket machine, the machine assumes the origin zone is the same as the station's zone, and prompts the passenger to select a destination zone, but the origin zone can be changed if necessary.

Fare chart (as of April 28, 2021)
Zones traveled	Fare Type	One Way (Note: Valid 4 hours from time of purchase)		Day Pass (Note: Valid on the day purchased, allows unlimited travel within the zones listed.)	Monthly (Note: Valid month of purchase.)
Zones traveled	Fare Type	TVM (Note: Ticket Vending Machine)	Clipper	TVM	Clipper
1	Regular	3.75	3.20	7.50	96.00
1	Discount (Note: Eligible Discount Fare, applies to senior, disabled, youth, or Medicare. Conductor or fare inspector may request proof of age or eligibility.)	1.75	1.60	3.75	48.00
2	Regular	6.00	5.45	12.00	163.50
2	Discount	2.75	2.60	6.00	78.00
3	Regular	8.25	7.70	16.50	231.00
3	Discount	3.75	3.60	8.25	108.00
4	Regular	10.50	9.95	21.00	298.50
4	Discount	4.75	4.60	10.50	138.00
5	Regular	12.75	12.20	25.50	366.00
5	Discount	5.75	5.60	12.75	168.00
6	Regular	15.00	14.45	30.00	433.50
6	Discount	6.75	6.60	15.00	198.00

Notes

Zone ticketing requires little infrastructure at the stations but can be expensive for passengers making a short trip that crosses a zone boundary (each zone is 13 miles long). Travel between Sunnyvale and Lawrence is a two-zone ride, since Sunnyvale is the southernmost station in Zone 3 and Lawrence is the northernmost station in Zone 4. A ride between Sunnyvale and Lawrence covers 2.0 miles (3.2 km) and costs $6, the same as San Francisco [Zone 1] to Redwood City [southernmost station in Zone 2], which covers a distance of 25.3 miles (40.7 km).

=== Payment ===
In August 2009 Caltrain became the fifth public transit agency in the San Francisco Bay Area to implement the Clipper card. Monthly passes are implemented exclusively through the Clipper card; in addition, some employer-sponsored annual Go passes are implemented through the Clipper card, starting in January 2019. All passengers who use the electronic Clipper card to ride (including holders of monthly and annual Go passes) must remember to "tag on" with their card prior to boarding and "tag off" with their card after exiting the train. If they board the train without tagging on, they will be subject to the same fines as riders without a ticket. Passengers with monthly passes must tag on and off at least once before the 15th of the month to activate the pass, unless the monthly pass was added through a physical card interaction at a retailer or add value machine.

Without a pass, stored cash on the Clipper card may be used to purchase a one-way ticket. Clipper card users receive a $0.55 discount on the one way full fares. When tagging on, the stored cash value on the Clipper card is debited the maximum one-way fare from the originating zone, where the card was tagged on prior to boarding the train. When tagging off, the stored cash value on the Clipper card is credited according to the destination zone when leaving the train; pass holders are credited the full amount that was debited when tagging off. If passengers who use the Clipper card fail to tag off when they exit the train, they will be charged "the highest cash fare from [their] point of origin", including pass holders. Because of the initial maximum fare debit when tagging on, passengers are required to have at least $1.25 stored cash on the Clipper card to avoid exceeding the card's allowable negative value limit when boarding Caltrain.

For example, if a passenger tags on and boards a northbound or southbound train at San Mateo (Zone 2), their Clipper card will be debited for a five-zone one-way fare (Zone 2 to Zone 6, which is the most distant theoretical destination from the origin point, a one-way fare debit of -$12.20); if that passenger travels south and tags off at Sunnyvale (Zone 3), their Clipper card will be credited for the three zones not traveled (Zones 4, 5, and 6; +$6.75 credit overall) so the net deduction from stored cash is a two-zone one-way fare (Zone 2 to 3, -$5.45 with Clipper cash discount), unless the passenger has a pass; in that case, the passenger would receive a $12.20 credit. In the example given, failing to tag off means the initial five-zone fare debit (Zone 2 to 6, -$12.20) would remain. Because pass holders are credited only when tagging off, pass holders also would be charged the five-zone fare debit if they forget to tag off.

Those who use a clipper card hear one beep or see a light flash when they tag on to begin their journey and see two flashes with a double beep when they tag off to end their trip. Three beeps mean the card does not have valid fare. This ensures Caltrain is universally accessible beyond many other Clipper card acceptance mechanisms.

In 2018, Caltrain rolled out a mobile app allowing riders to purchase fares from Android and iOS smartphones. The Caltrain Mobile app was written by moovel North America, which has written apps with similar functionality for Santa Clara Valley Transportation Agency and San Francisco Municipal Transportation Agency.

=== Fare enforcement ===
Caltrain proof-of-payment system sign

Before 2018, passengers who were unable to show a viable ticket were subject to fines of up to $250 plus court fees. Approximately 2,100 riders are given verbal warnings or written citations per month for fare evasion, and, while the old system was in place, an average of 15 incidents of violence against conductors occurred every month as a result of fare enforcement. This has led to trains being delayed while waiting for the police to respond. The fines for fare evasion were collected by the superior court system of the county in which the ticket is issued, and were not returned to Caltrain. The complexity of the ticketing system meant that up to 65% of issued fine tickets were later overturned in court.

Caltrain moved to a more streamlined process of issuing citations, effective February 1, 2018. Rather than writing the citation on the spot, which takes up to fifteen minutes, the conductor will scan the photo ID, and an administrative penalty will be mailed to the address on record, bypassing the civil superior court system. In addition, the cost of the fine decreased to $75 per infraction, and Caltrain will retain the fees. However, passengers who accrue a third (or more) fare evasion citation will be subject to traditional fines and/or criminal penalties through the superior court system.

== Logos, markings, and liveries ==
During the initial years as the state was assuming control (1980–1985), locomotives and rolling stock were leased from Southern Pacific. The leased "suburban" and "gallery" coaches continued to wear SP's standard dark grey. Locomotives wore SP's "Bloody Nose" paint scheme.

An experimental scheme was applied to SP/CDTX No. 3187 and three gallery cars (SP/CDTX Nos. 3700, 3701, 3702), unveiled on May 15, 1982; the locomotive had a red nose and both locomotive and cars had the body painted silver on the upper half,and dark blue on the lower half, separated by three stripes (blue, teal, and red). The scheme was nicknamed "Rainbow", "Postal Service", or "Mailbox".

When new equipment was introduced in 1985, CalTrain adopted a new logo and painted the newly acquired silver EMD F40PH locomotives with teal and blue stripes, matching the colors in the Caltrans logo.

After the new Caltrain logo was adopted in 1997, the F40PH locomotives were repainted to gray with a black roof, and the MPI MP36 locomotives ordered for Baby Bullet service wore gray with red accents.

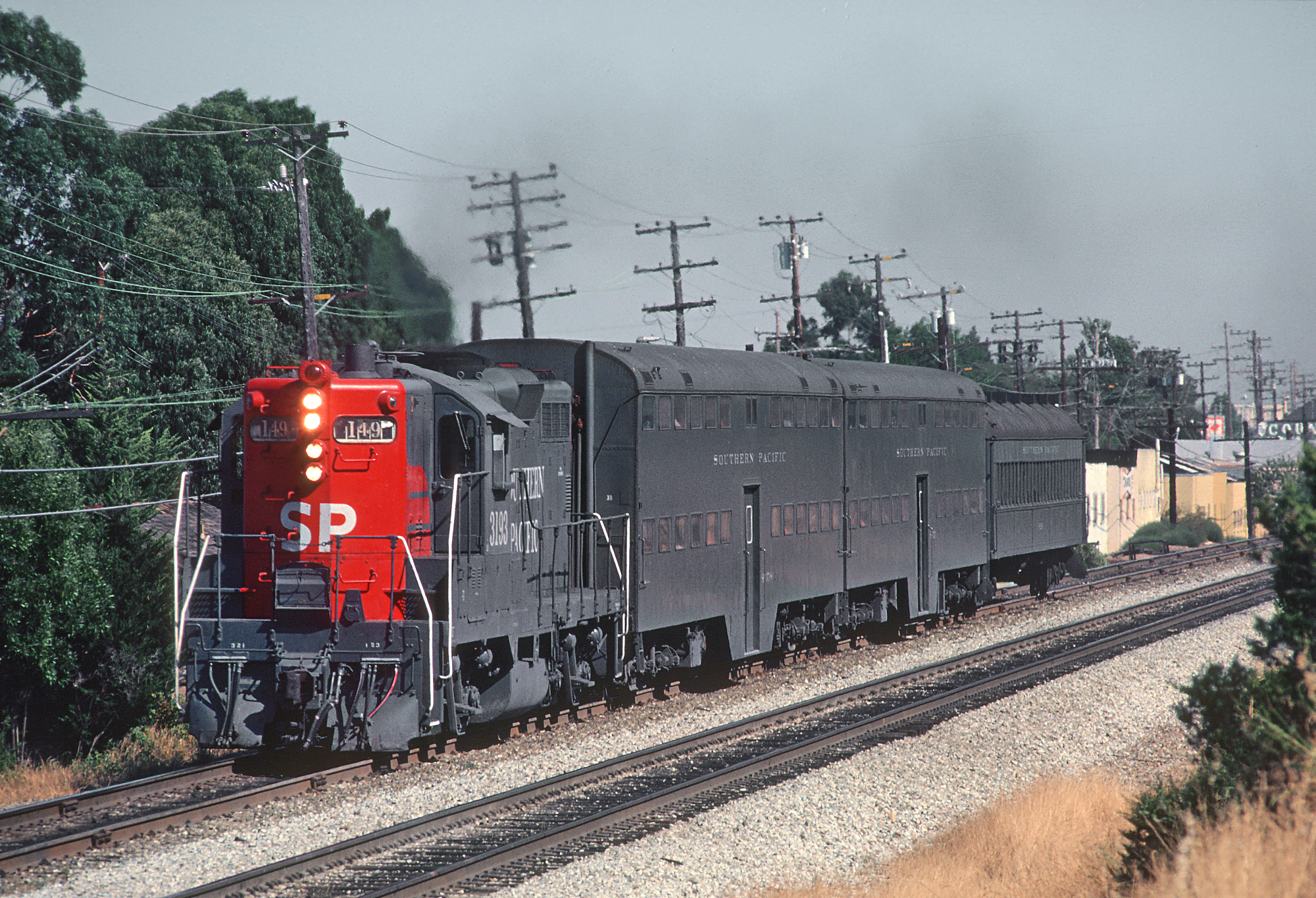
SP No. 3193 wears "Bloody Nose" pulling 3-car consist past San Mateo (1980)

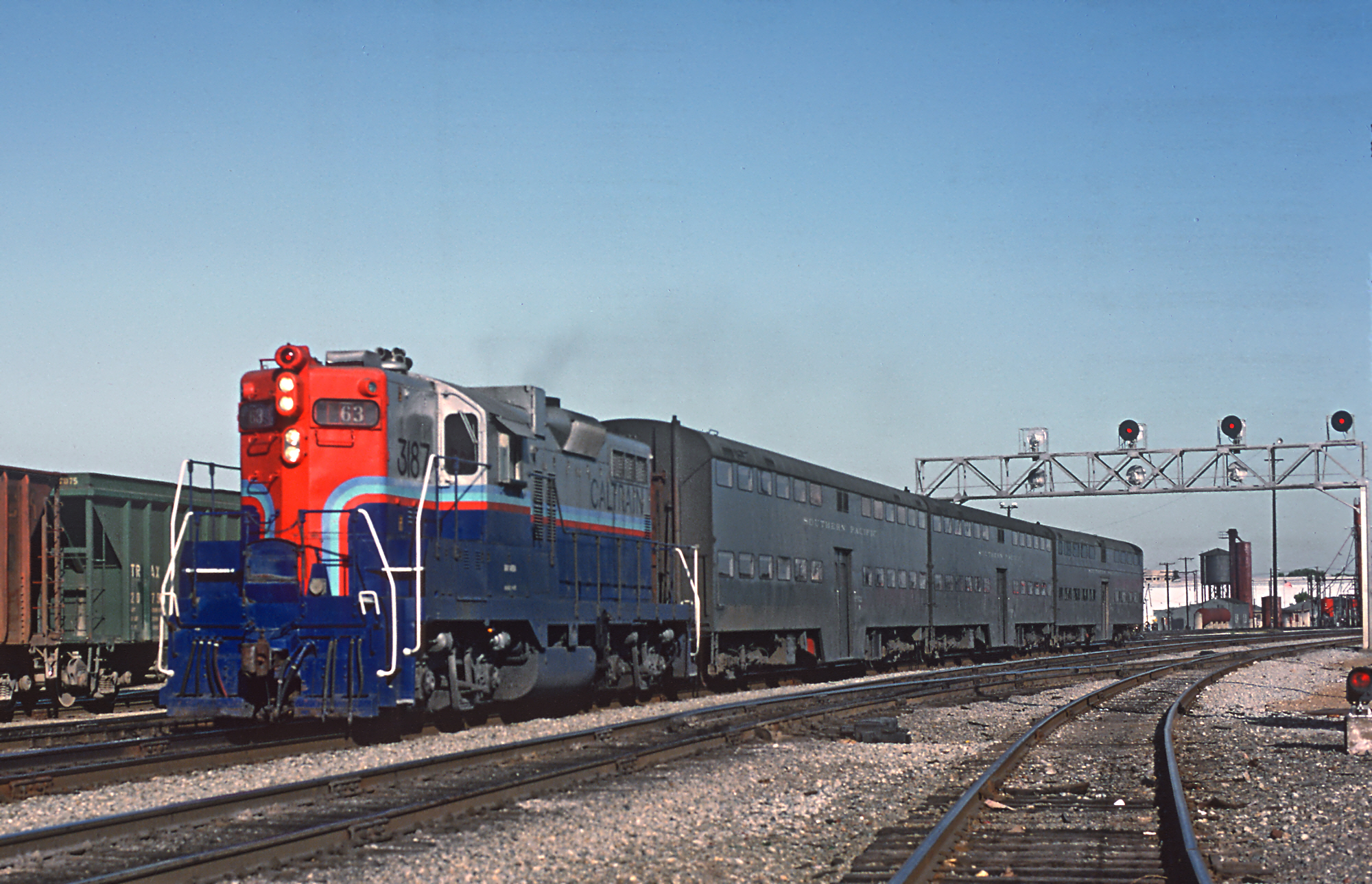
SP No. 3187 repainted in experimental CALTRAIN "Rainbow" livery (1985)

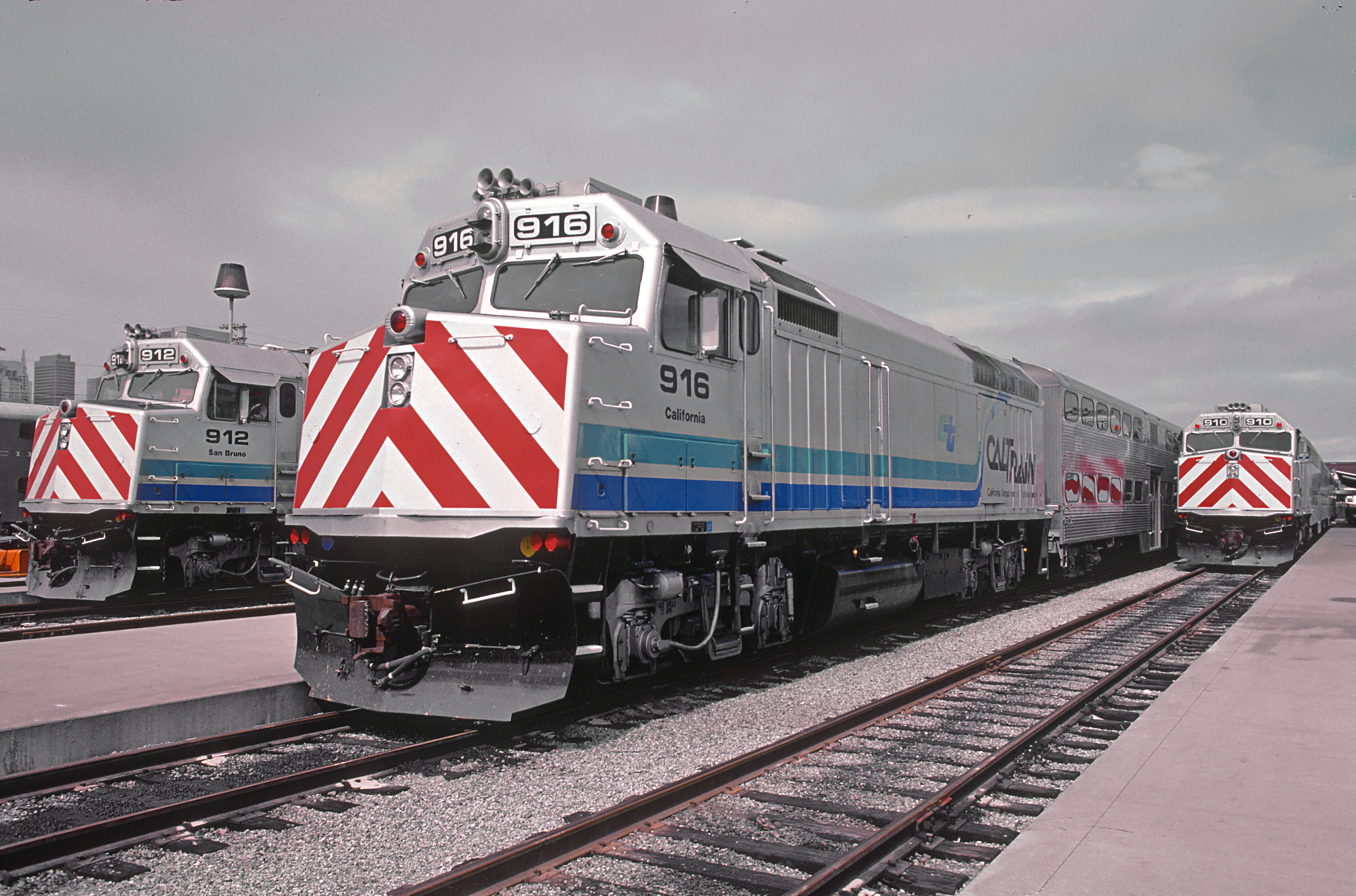
916 "California" wears blue and teal stripes under state control (1985)

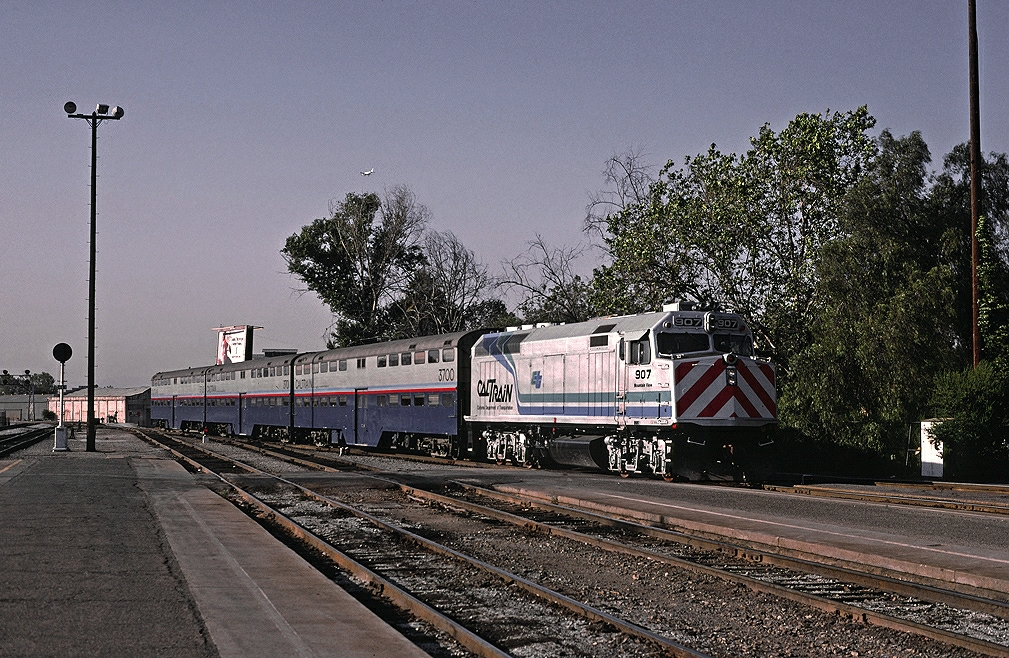
907 "Mountain View" carrying original Caltrans blue-and-teal stripes, pulling the three "Rainbow" gallery cars CDTX 3700, 3701, 3702 (1985)

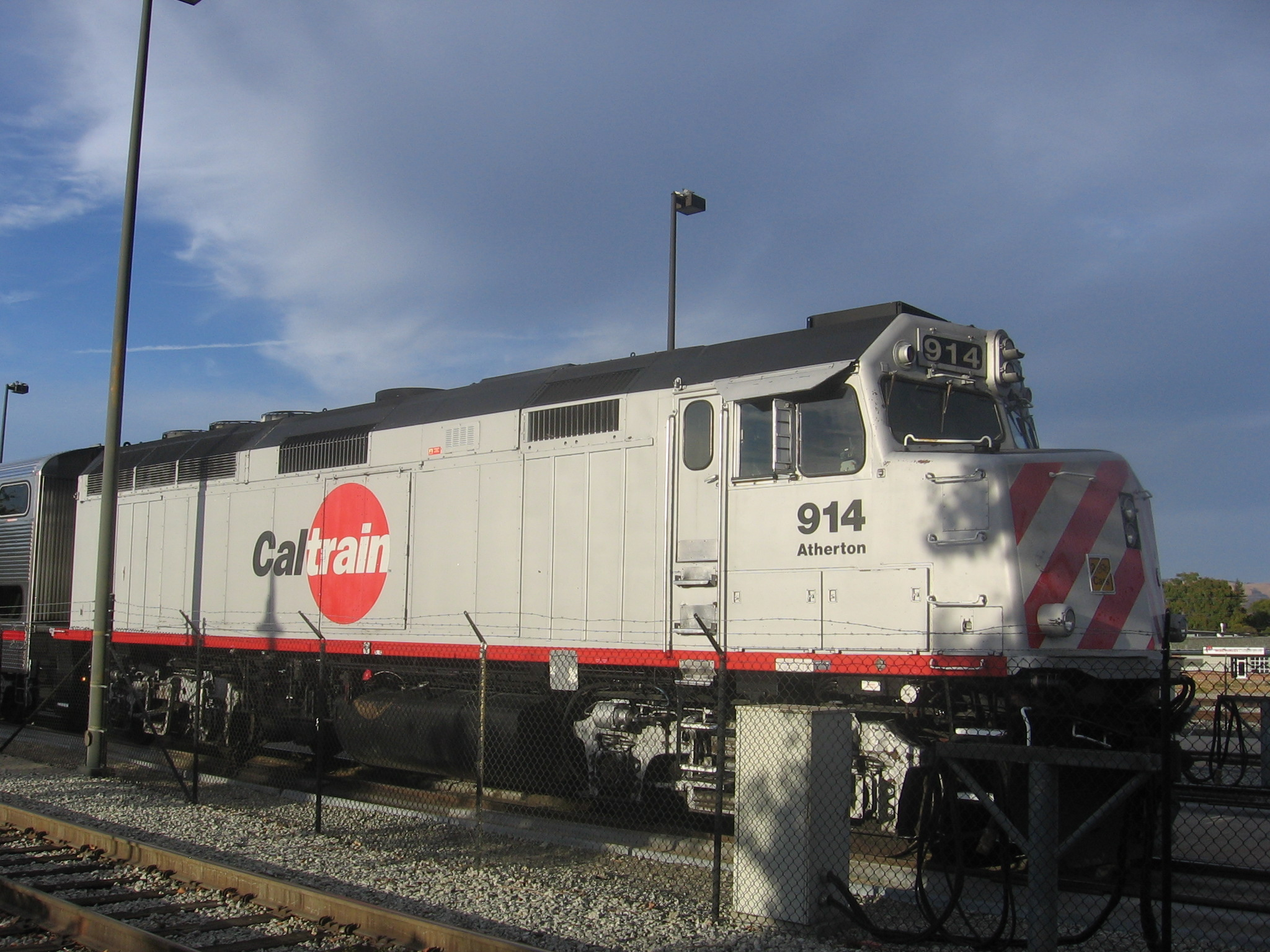
914 "Atherton" F40PH repainted with new logo and new livery (2012)

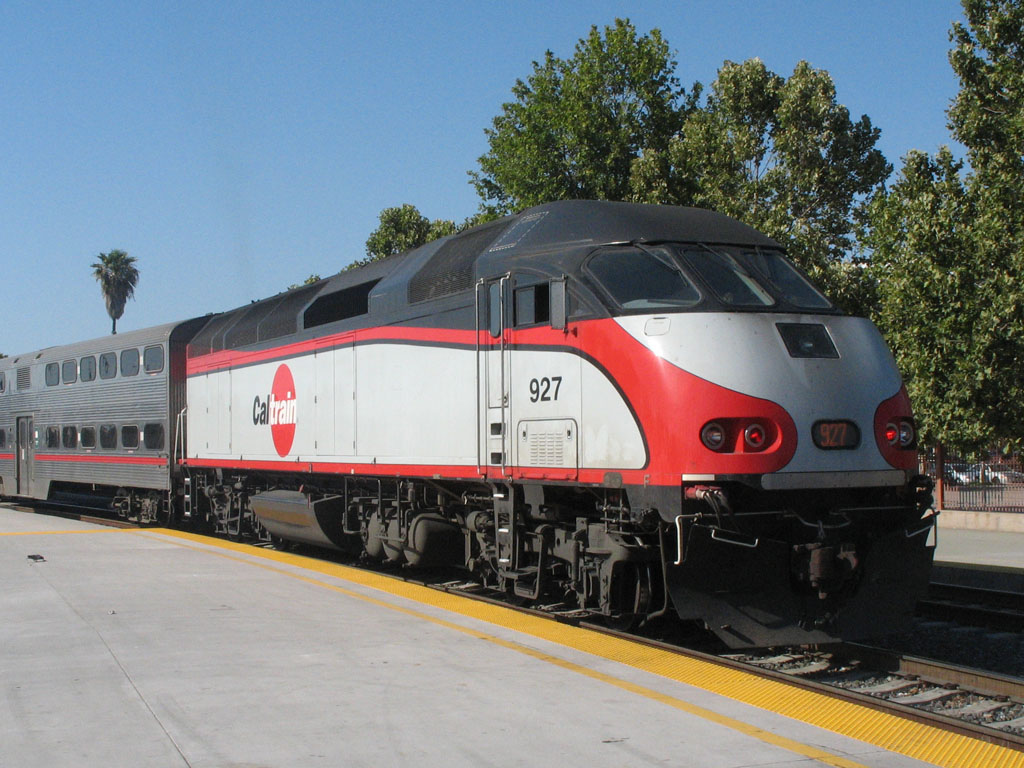
MPI MP36 locomotives carry as-ordered gray and red livery (2007, locomotive 927)

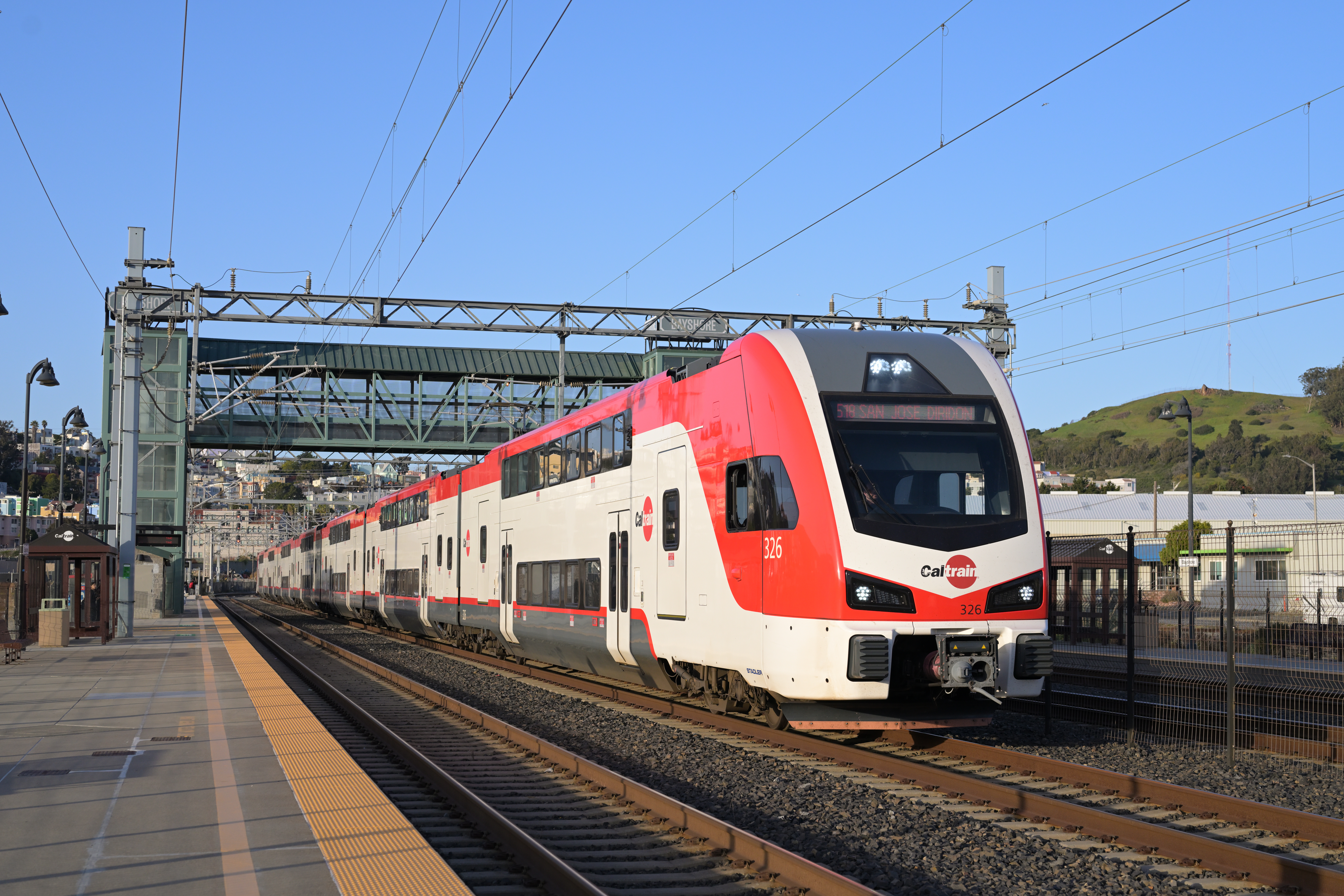
Stadler KISS EMUs are painted with red-on-white livery (2026)
1982 logo used only on SP No. 3187

1985–1997 logo

1997–present logo

1997–present roundel

=== Train numbering scheme ===
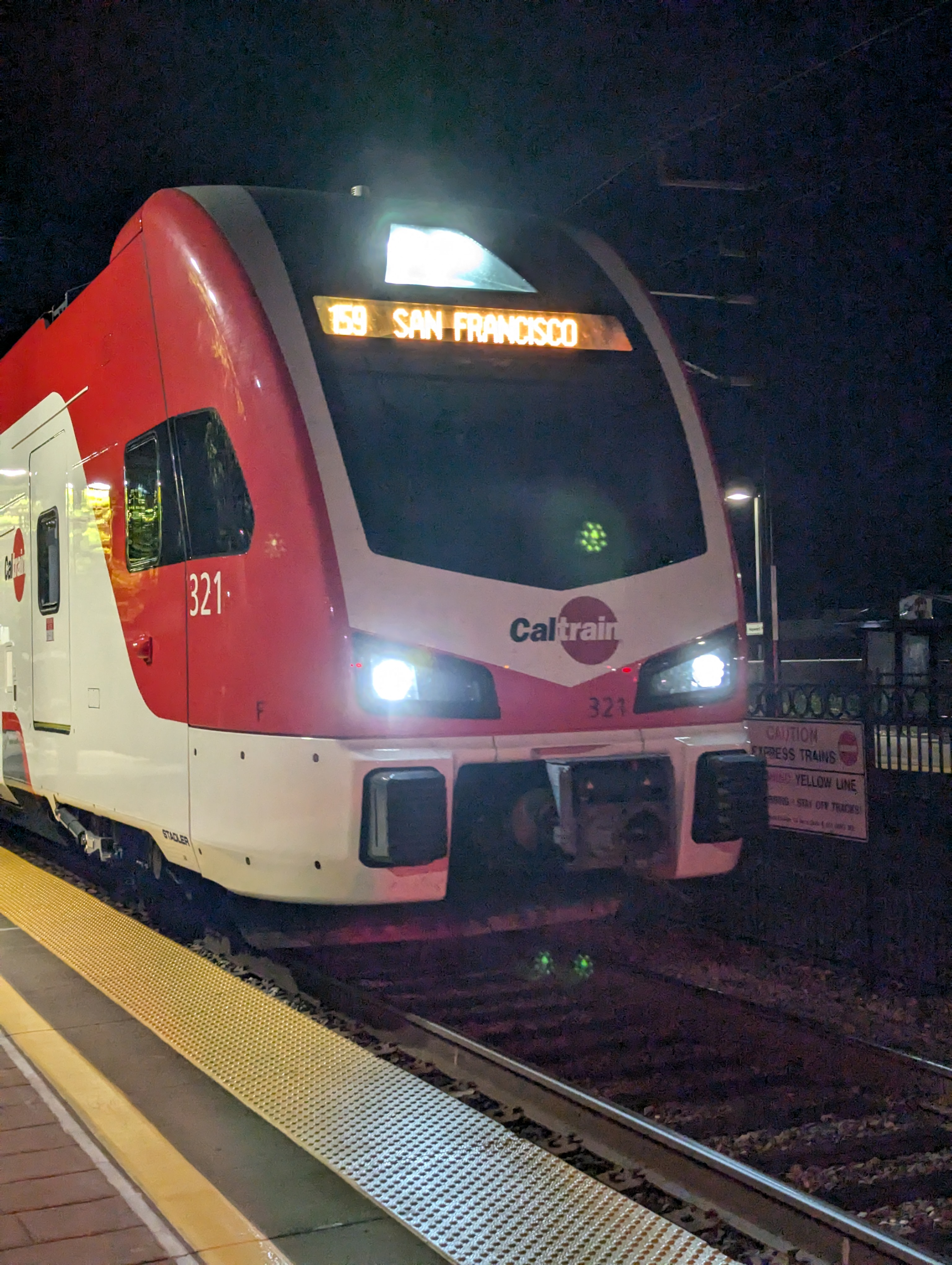
Caltrain train No. 159 at Hayward Park, the 30th northbound local 1xx train; electronic headsign indicates train number and final destination (San Francisco).

Each train on the schedule is assigned a three-digit number indicating direction, sequence and stop pattern. With the transition to fully electric service between San Francisco and Tamien, using Stadler KISS EMUs, the entire three-digit train number and final destination are displayed on electronic destination signs visible on the leading (cab) car and the side windows of other cars. Caltrain adopted a modified train numbering scheme starting in September 2024:

- The first digit still indicates the service/stop pattern:
  - 1xx trains are weekday local trains that make all regular stops.
  - 4xx trains are weekday limited-service trains that run skip-stop between San Francisco and Redwood City, and local between Redwood City and San Jose Diridon.
  - 5xx trains are weekday express trains, similar to the legacy Baby Bullet trains with a few additional stops.
  - 6xx trains are weekend local trains that make all regular stops.
  - 8xx trains are South County Connector diesel services operating between San Jose and Gilroy.
- The second and third digits are assigned sequentially within each stop pattern, starting from x01.
  - The second and third digits still indicate the direction of the train; odd-numbered trains run northbound, and even-numbered trains run southbound.
  - For example, 501 is the first northbound train that operates with the 5xx express service stop pattern, and 502 would be the first southbound train with the same 5xx stop pattern. Thus x03 is the second northbound train, x04 is the second southbound train, etc.

==== Legacy schemes ====
Train number locations on locomotives (top row) and control cars (bottom row)

The practice of placarding train numbers, which provides basic information about the train's direction and type of service, dates back to when the trains were operated by Southern Pacific. The train number placard was displayed on each leading element (locomotive or cab car), using a physical or electronic sign which may be changed by the engineer. The train number should not be confused with the locomotive or equipment number, which is the 9xx number permanently stenciled on each locomotive, or the three or four-digit number similarly painted on each piece of rolling stock.

Until 2021

All train number placards were physical signs capable of displaying two digits only until the MPI MP36 locomotives entered service in 2004, which can display three digits on an electronic sign. Prior to 2021, two-digit physical train number placards reflected the sequential train number, which are the last two digits of the three-digit train number.

- The first digit of the number posted on the trains indicated the stop pattern.
  - The first digit for weekday trains was always 1, 2 or 3.
    - 1xx trains were local trains that made all regular stops.
    - 2xx trains were limited-service trains that skipped some stations. Each limited-service train used one of three or four stop patterns: local south of Redwood City, local north of Redwood City, or express services with approximately double the number of stops compared to Baby Bullet trains. In general, the split-local limited trains offered timed transfers at Menlo Park, Redwood City, and San Carlos.
    - 3xx trains were Baby Bullet trains, which made the fewest stops.
  - The first digit for weekend trains was always 4 or 8.
    - 4xx trains were local trains that made all stops.
    - 8xx trains were Weekend Baby Bullet trains that made fewer stops.
- The second and third digits indicated the sequence number of the train. For instance, x01 was the first train of the day.
  - These digits also indicated the direction of the train; odd-numbered trains run northbound, and even-numbered trains run southbound. Thus x02 is the first southbound train of the day, x03 is the second northbound train of the day, etc.

2021 – 2024

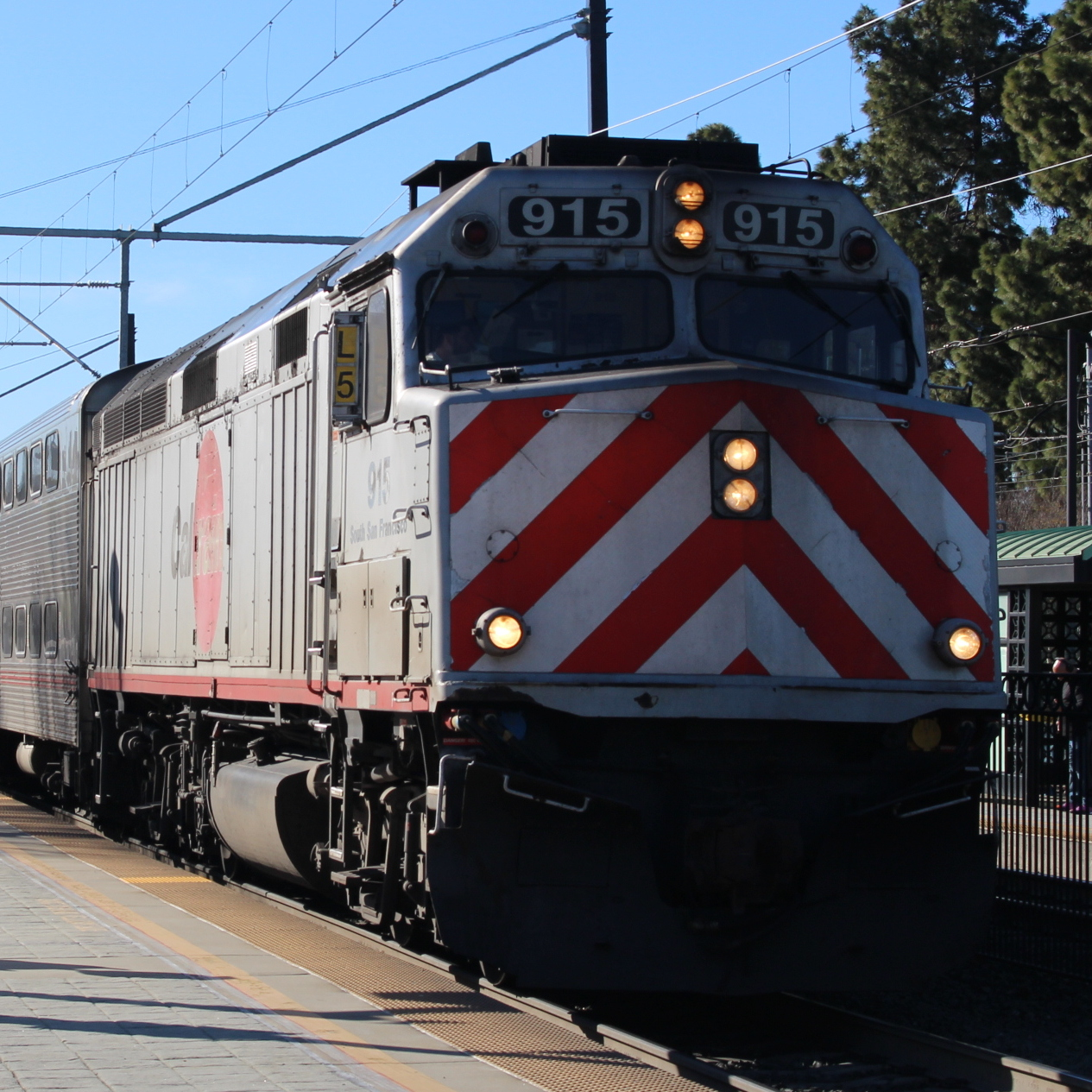
Caltrain F40PH-2CAT locomotive 915 with a two-digit placard "L5", indicating this is a 5xx limited-stop train

Between August 30, 2021, and September 2024, Caltrain used a modified numbering scheme.

- The first digit reflects the stopping pattern:
  - 1xx were local weekday trains making all regular stops
  - 2xx were local weekend trains making all regular stops
  - 3xx were limited weekday trains which skip selected stops, running local service between Lawrence and Redwood City
  - 4xx were limited weekday trains which skip selected stops, running local between San Mateo and San Bruno
  - 5xx were limited weekday trains which skip selected stops, running local between Palo Alto and Redwood City
  - 7xx were Baby Bullet/express weekday trains which have the fewest stops, either seven southbound or eight northbound stops between San Jose and San Francisco
- The second and third digits are assigned sequentially within the service type
  - These continue to reflect the direction of travel, so even numbers = southbound and odd = northbound. For example, 504 is the second southbound train within the 5xx stopping pattern.

In addition, during this period, the information provided on the two-digit physical placards on the leading element of the train (either the control car, for northbound trains, or the locomotive, for southbound trains) was changed to provide the stop pattern only. Two-digit train placards combined the basic stopping scheme (L for local or limited, B for Baby Bullet service) with the first digit of the train number; for example, train 501 is the first northbound train with the 5xx limited stop pattern, and would carry "L5" on the physical placard; in the pre-2021 scheme, this train would have carried "01" instead.

== Rolling stock ==
=== Electric multiple units ===
Caltrain Stadler KISS EMUs

New Caltrain Stadler KISS EMU train undergoing testing in San Jose (Nov 2023)

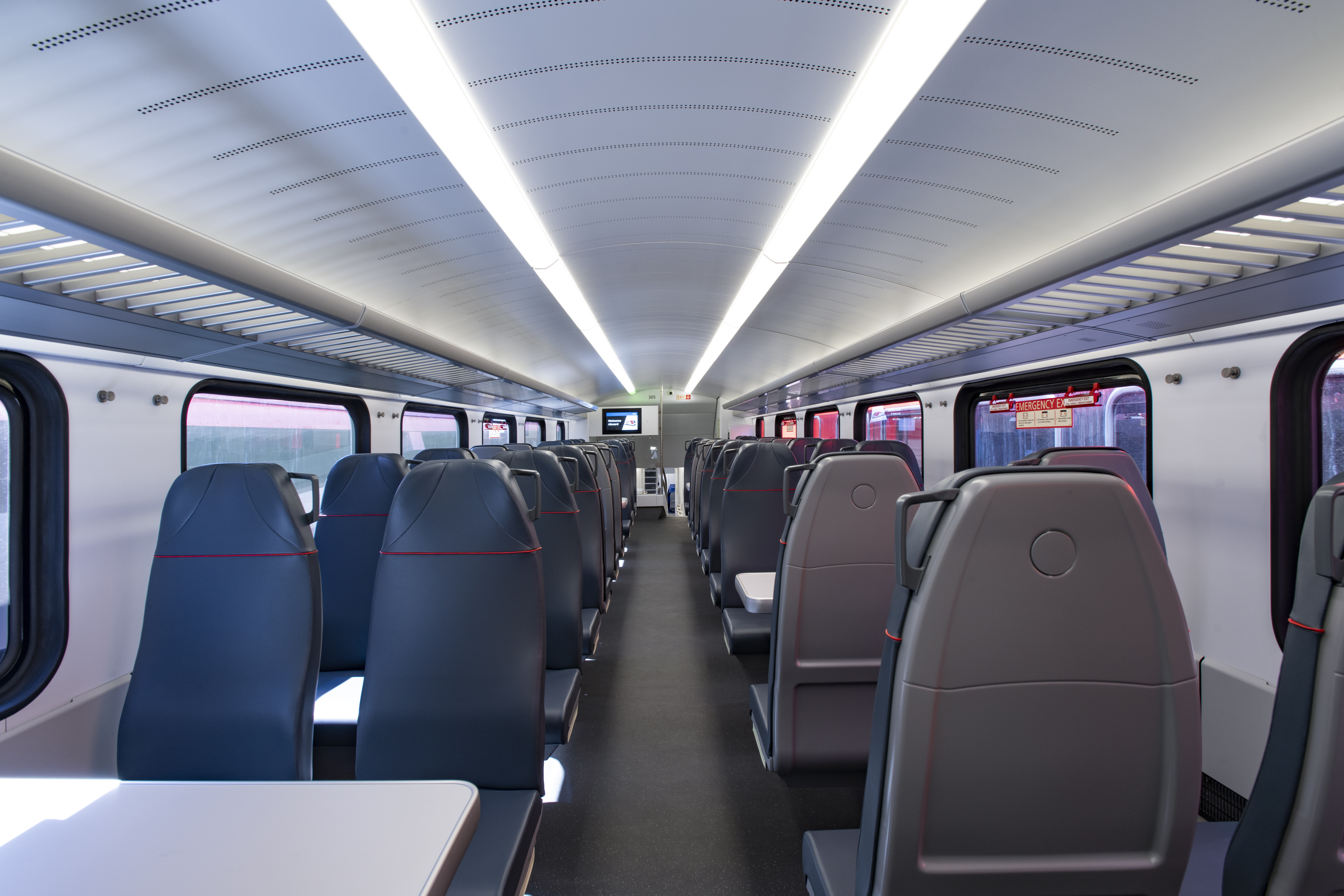
Upper deck of Caltrain EMU passenger car (Sep 2022)

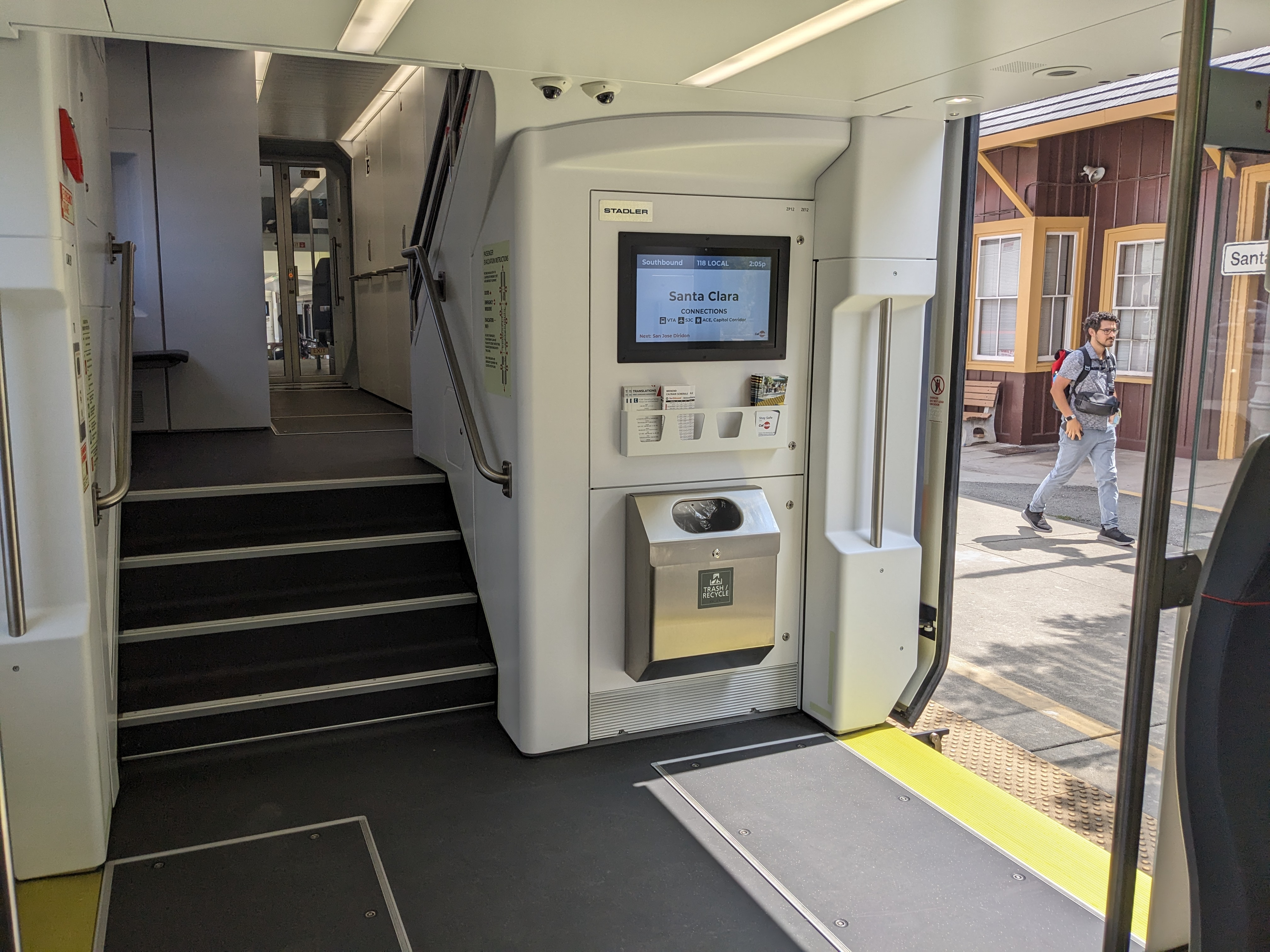
Lower entrance door, vestibule stairs, and gangway areas inside EMU passenger cars (Aug 2024)

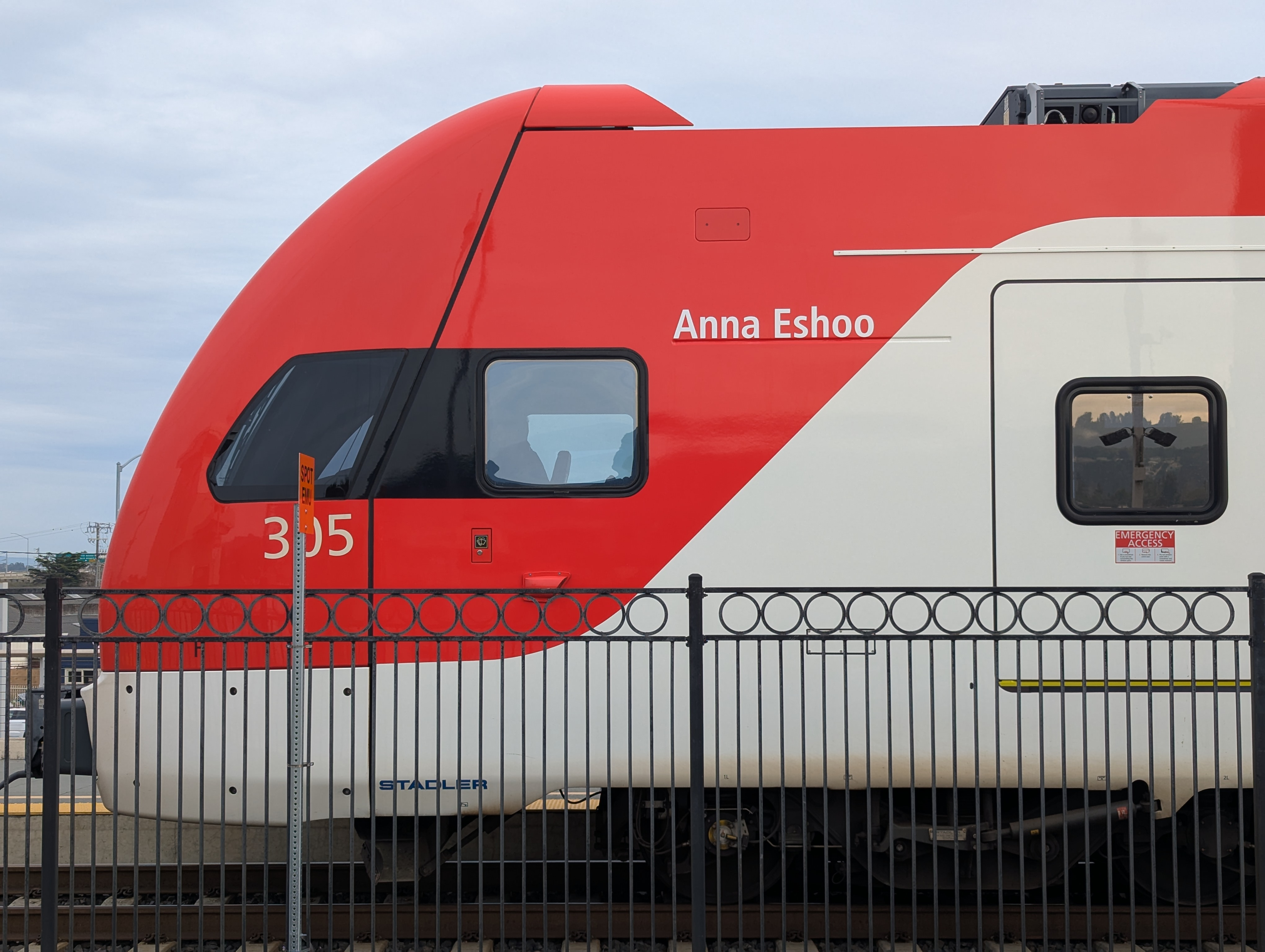
No. 305 named for Rep. Anna Eshoo (Jan 2025)

In August 2016, Caltrain awarded a $551 million contract to Stadler Rail, which would produce the trainsets needed for running on the electrified line. The award was for 96 Stadler KISS EMU cars arranged into 16 trainsets, scheduled to be delivered for testing by August 2019. Under the contract, Caltrain had the option to procure an additional 96 units in the future for an additional $385 million. In December 2018, Caltrain was reportedly carrying 65,000 passengers a day, and expected to have 240,000 daily riders in 2040. Therefore, after funding was received from the California State Transportation Agency's Transit and Intercity Rail Capital Program, Caltrain's board approved the purchase of additional cars from Stadler, increasing the order from 16 six-car sets to 19 seven-car sets.

In August 2023, Caltrain exercised an option order for four additional seven-car EMU trainsets ($220 million) and a single four-car battery electric multiple unit (BEMU) trainset ($80 million). This will result in a fleet of 23 EMU trainsets, six diesel-hauled trainsets, and one BEMU trainset by 2030, with over 90% of service using electric trains. The BEMU trainset will be used on the non-electrified portion of the corridor between Tamien and Gilroy.

New trains are double-decked and equipped for both 22-and-50.5-inch (559 and 1,283 mm) platform heights in anticipation of sharing facilities with California High-Speed Rail trains. The six-car EMU trainsets would have been 515 feet 3 inches (157.05 m) long; as delivered, the seven-car EMU trains are 598 ft 11.4 in (182.560 m). Units can reach speeds of 110 mph (177 km/h), though operations will likely be limited to 79 miles per hour (127 km/h).

Acceleration and deceleration of the EMUs are substantially better than the legacy diesel-electric trains. The legacy locomotives offer a starting tractive effort of 65,000 lbf (290 kN) for an EMD F40PH-2 and 85,000 lbf (380 kN) for an MPI M36PH-3C, while a seven-car KISS EMU set has a starting tractive effort of 145,190 lbf (645.85 kN).

The first Stadler KISS was completed by Stadler's Salt Lake City factory in July 2020. It was taken to the Transportation Technology Center in Pueblo, Colorado, for high-speed testing.

Caltrain began public operation of its electrified trainsets on August 11, 2024, with two trainsets, adding more trains each week until the full rollout of electric service on September 21.

Line scan photo of 7-car formation with EMU 321/322.

Electric multiple units of Caltrain
Builder	Model	Type	Numbers	Quantity	Entered service	Notes	Image
Stadler	KISS	EMU cab car	301–346	23 sets (46 cars)	2024	No. 305/306 named for Anna Eshoo; No. 323/324 named for Nancy Pelosi. The truck away from the cab is powered.	
Stadler	KISS	EMU passenger car	3011–3456	23 sets (115 cars)	2024	First three digits are the trainset's odd-numbered cab car number; restrooms in 3xx1 cars; bicycle storage on 3xx2 and 3xx6 cars. Both trucks powered on 3xx1, 3xx3, and 3xx5 cars, as indicated by removal of vestibule seats.	
Stadler	KISS	BEMU		1 set (4 cars)		On order	

=== Locomotives ===
Prior to 1985, Caltrain used equipment leased from Southern Pacific, including SP/CDTX 3187, an EMD GP9 repainted in prototype Caltrain livery and other locomotives that had been used for the Peninsula Commute service. Since 1985, Caltrain has used the following locomotives, which are almost all powered by diesel engines:

Caltrain locomotives
Builder	Model	Locomotive Numbers	Years of service	Notes	Image
MPI	MP36PH-3C	923–928	2003–present	Underwent mid-life overhaul by Alstom at Mare Island between 2020 and 2023. Currently in service on the South County Connector. No. 925 named after Jackie Speier.	
MPI	F40PH-2C	920–922	1998–present	Cummins-powered HEP generators; 920 bore Operation Lifesaver logo until 2019; underwent mid-life overhaul by MPI at Boise, Idaho between 2017 and 2020. Currently on lease to Amtrak California until 2031.	
EMD	F40PH-2	902, 903, 907, 910, 914	1985–2024	Ordered new by Caltrans; Overhauled by Alstom in 1999; HEP generators retained original gear drive from main engine. Retired when electric service began. All units were sold to Lima, Peru.	
EMD	F40PH-2CAT	900, 901, 904–906, 908, 909, 911–913, 915–919	1985–2024	Originally F40PH-2s; ordered new by Caltrans; overhauled by Alstom in 1999 and HEP generators were converted to separate Caterpillar 6-cylinder engines. Units 918 and 919 entered service in 1987. Most retired when electric service began, remaining units retired later. Most units were sold to Lima, Peru. Unit 919 was damaged beyond economical repair in a 2022 accident and is likely to be preserved by the Midwest Overland Rail Preservation Society.	Three EMD F40PH-2CATs at San Francisco.
EMD	GP9	3187	1980–1985	Experimental "Rainbow" livery, leased from SP during transition to Caltrain.	
EMD	GP9	500, 501	1999–2013	Work train/yard switcher service. Leased, then purchased from Power Fluids & Metals in 2000 to support right-of-way rebuild under the Ponderosa Project. 500 and 501 are ex-SP 3833 & SP 3842, respectively. Sold to Motive Power Resources late 2012, left Caltrain on March 8, 2013.	
EMD	MP15DC	503, 504	2003–present	Work train/yard switcher service. 503 and 504 are ex-SP 2691 and 2692, respectively; originally built 1974, sold 1994.	EMD MP15DC No. 504.
EMD	AEM-7AC	929, 938	2023–present	Ex-Amtrak AEM-7AC units 929 and 938, used for testing electrification.	

Caltrain also leased a number of Amtrak F40PH's in 1998 and 1999 while Caltrain's F40PH-2's were being overhauled.

Since September 2024, newer diesel locomotives have been retained for service between Gilroy and San Jose. Revenue service between San Francisco and Tamien is provided by electric multiple units. Older diesel locomotives (built before 1987) were sold to Lima, Peru.

=== Legacy passenger cars ===
Before the rollout of all-electric service between San Francisco and Tamien in September 2024, Caltrain diesel trains consisted of one locomotive and a five- or six-car consist. Trains ran in a puller configuration (led by the locomotive) towards San Jose and in a pusher configuration (led by the cab car) towards San Francisco, so the orientation of cars remained consistent.

Passenger areas of legacy Caltrain cars

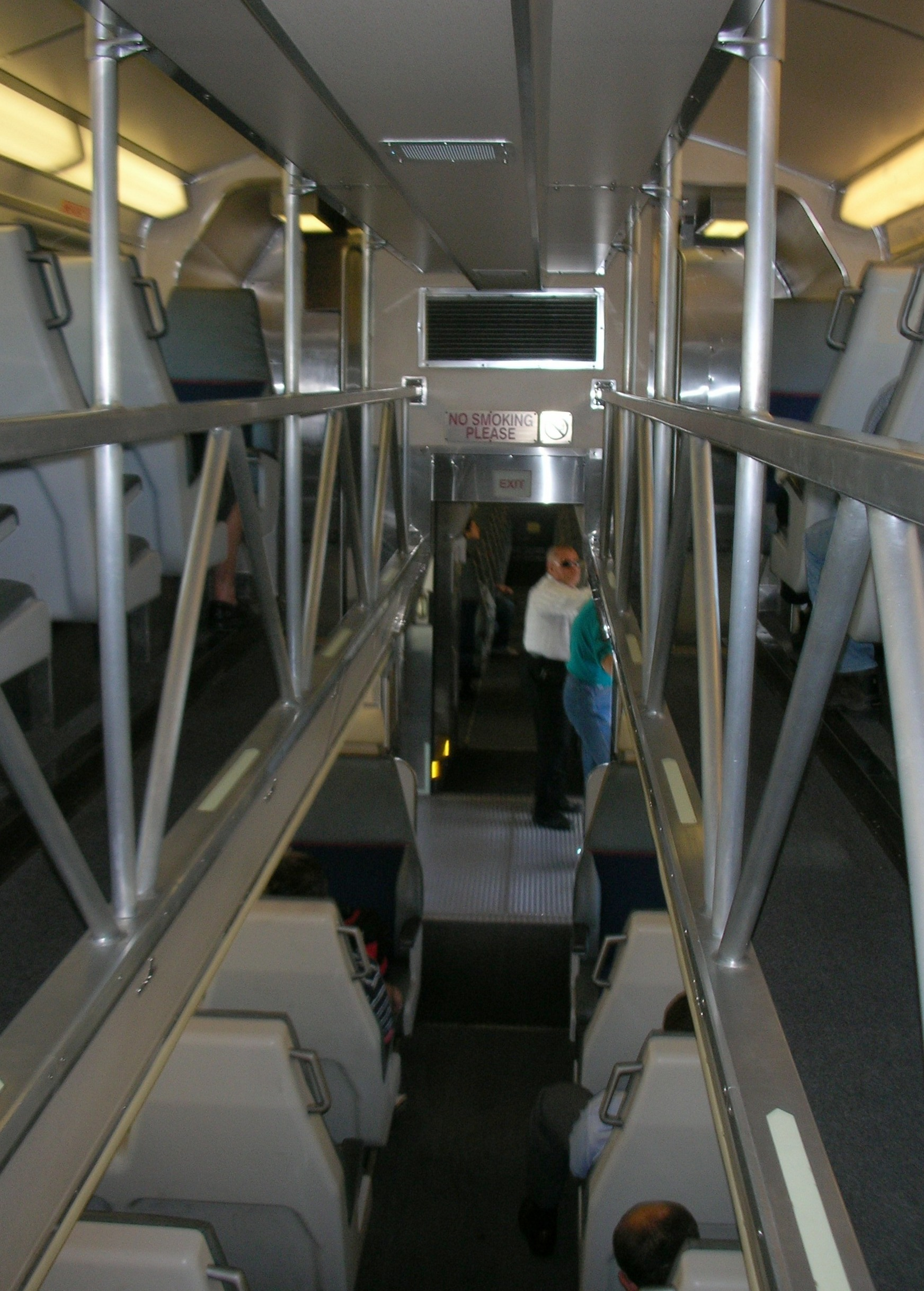
Interior of a Nippon Sharyo gallery car

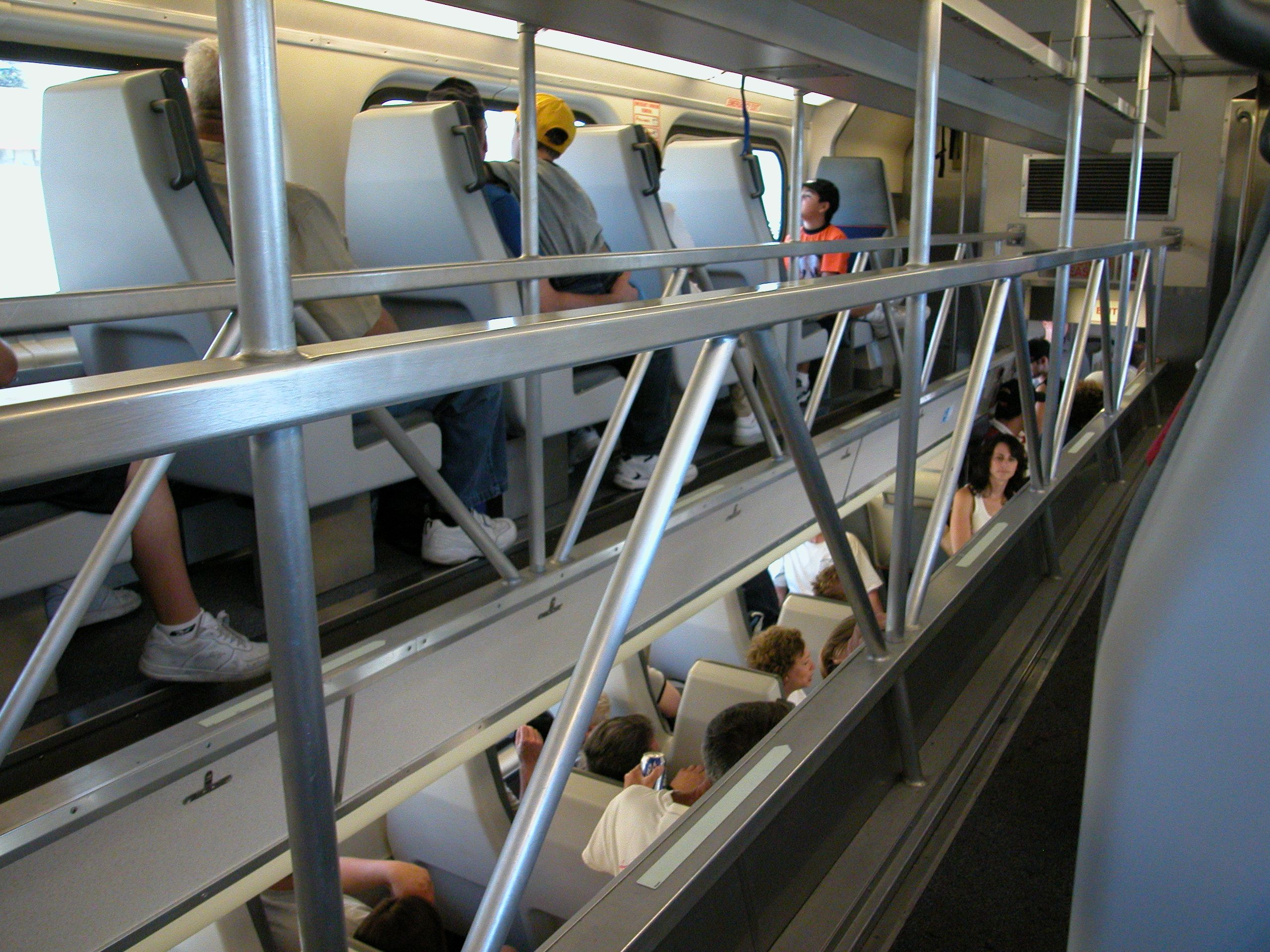
Structural trusses on a crowded gallery car

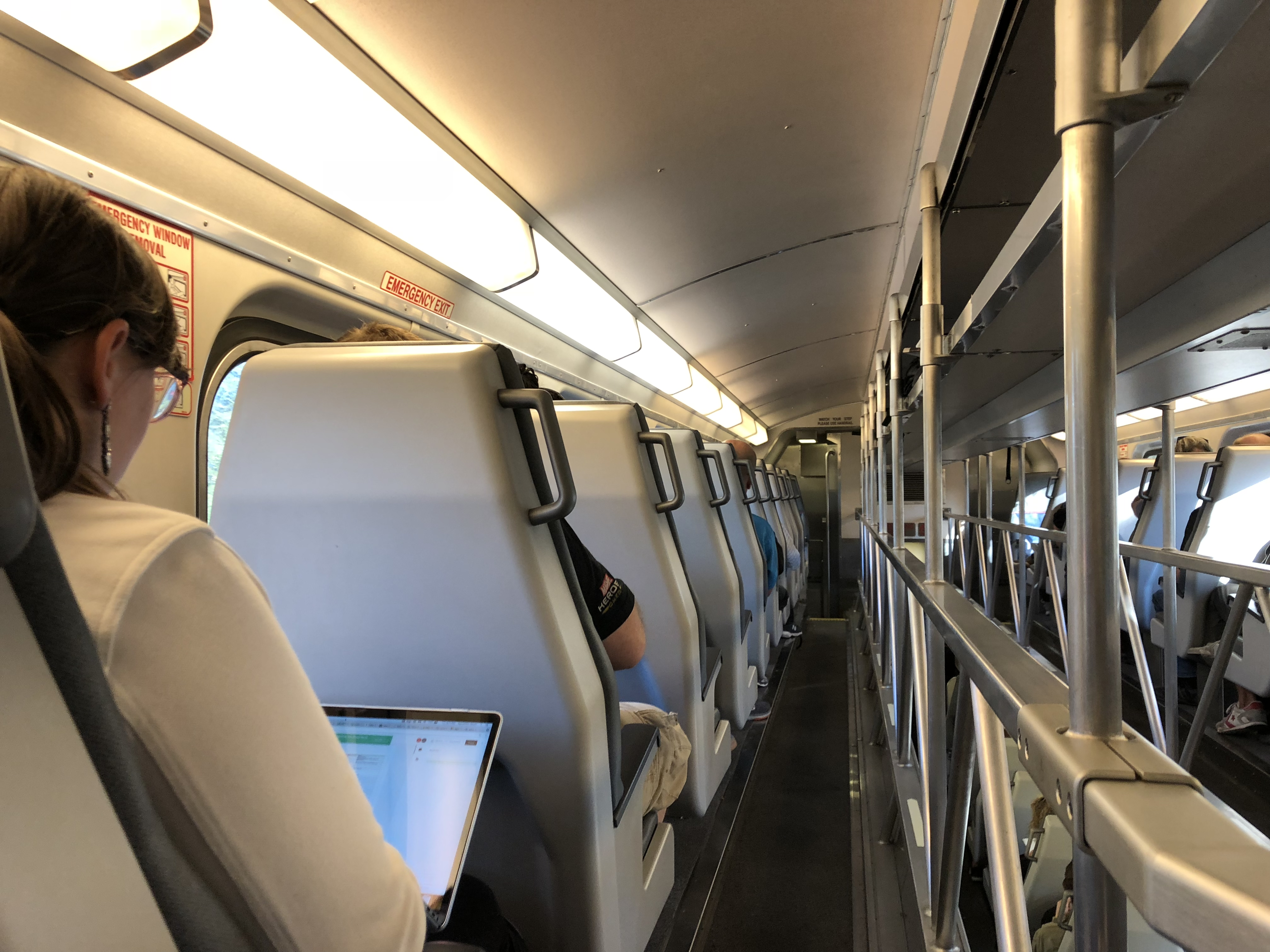
Single seats on upper deck of a gallery car

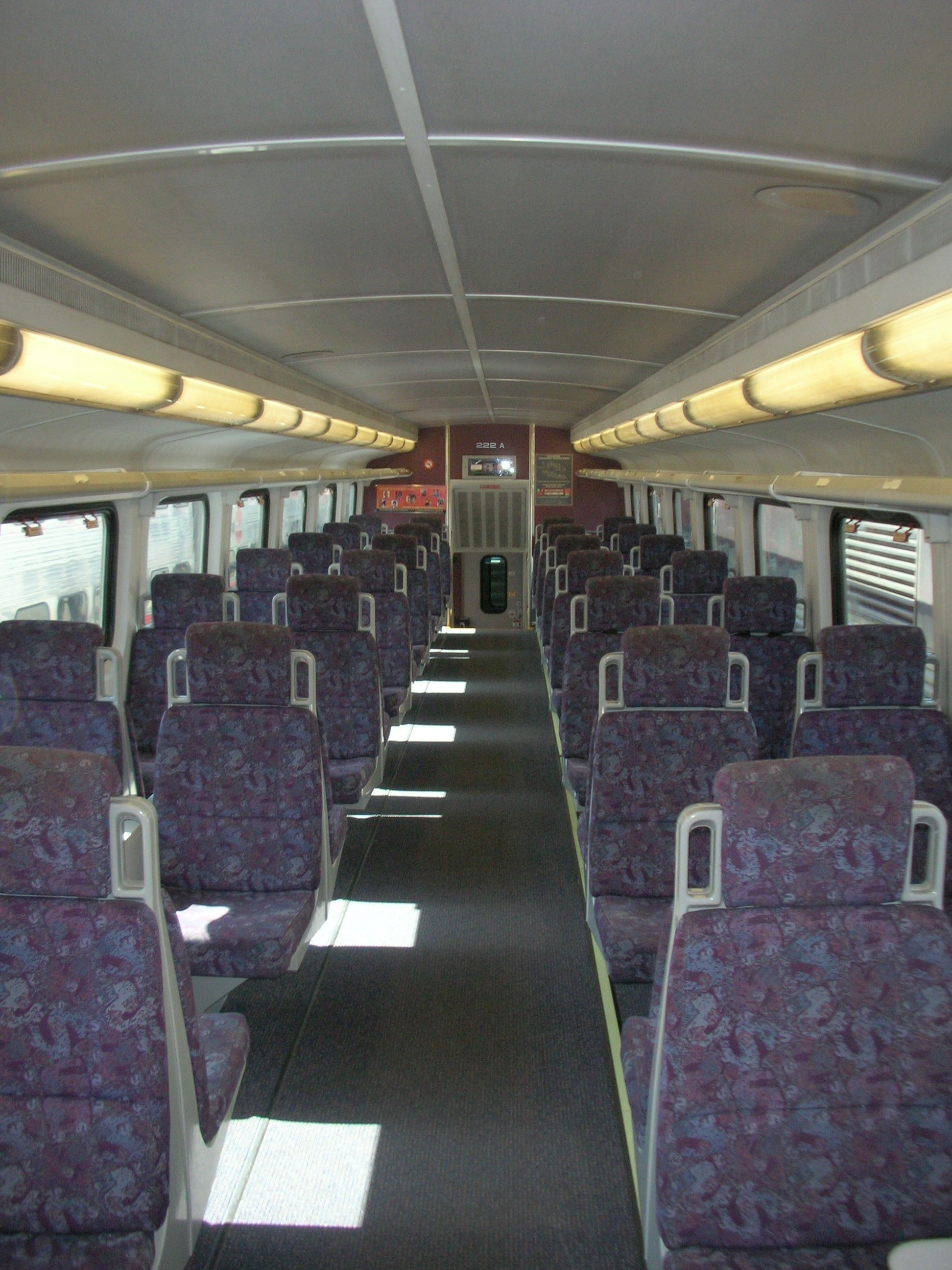
Upper deck of a Bombardier BiLevel car

Caltrain had 93 Nippon Sharyo bi-level Gallery-type cars and 41 Bombardier BiLevel Coaches in revenue service in 2017. Each revenue train consist was made up of a single type of car, i.e., the passenger cars in trains were either all gallery or all bilevel, never mixed. Of the Gallery cars, 66 were coaches and 27 were bike-accessible cab cars. Caltrans purchased the first 63 gallery cars in 1985 when it began subsidizing the commuter rail service. The other 30 were purchased by Caltrain in 2000, and the older cars were rebuilt by Nippon Sharyo around the same time.

The first 17 Bombardier BiLevel Coaches were purchased as surplus from Sounder Commuter Rail in 2002, of which 10 are coaches, 5 are cab-bike cars, and 2 are cab-wheelchair cars. Caltrain purchased an additional eight cars in 2008 to meet short-term passenger growth and to increase spare ratio. These Bombardier cars were initially only used on Baby Bullet express trains, but were later also used on limited-stop and local trains.

Caltrain bought 14 remanufactured Budd Rail Diesel Car ("Boise Budd") single-level cars from Virginia Railway Express around 2000 for use on Special-Event trains. A seven-car special train took fans to the first game at Pac Bell Park on March 31, 2000. The northbound train ran at an estimated 125% of capacity and skipped stops after Hillsdale because it was already well above seated capacity. These cars were sold in 2005 after Bombardier cars were delivered and are now in service on the Grand Canyon Railway.

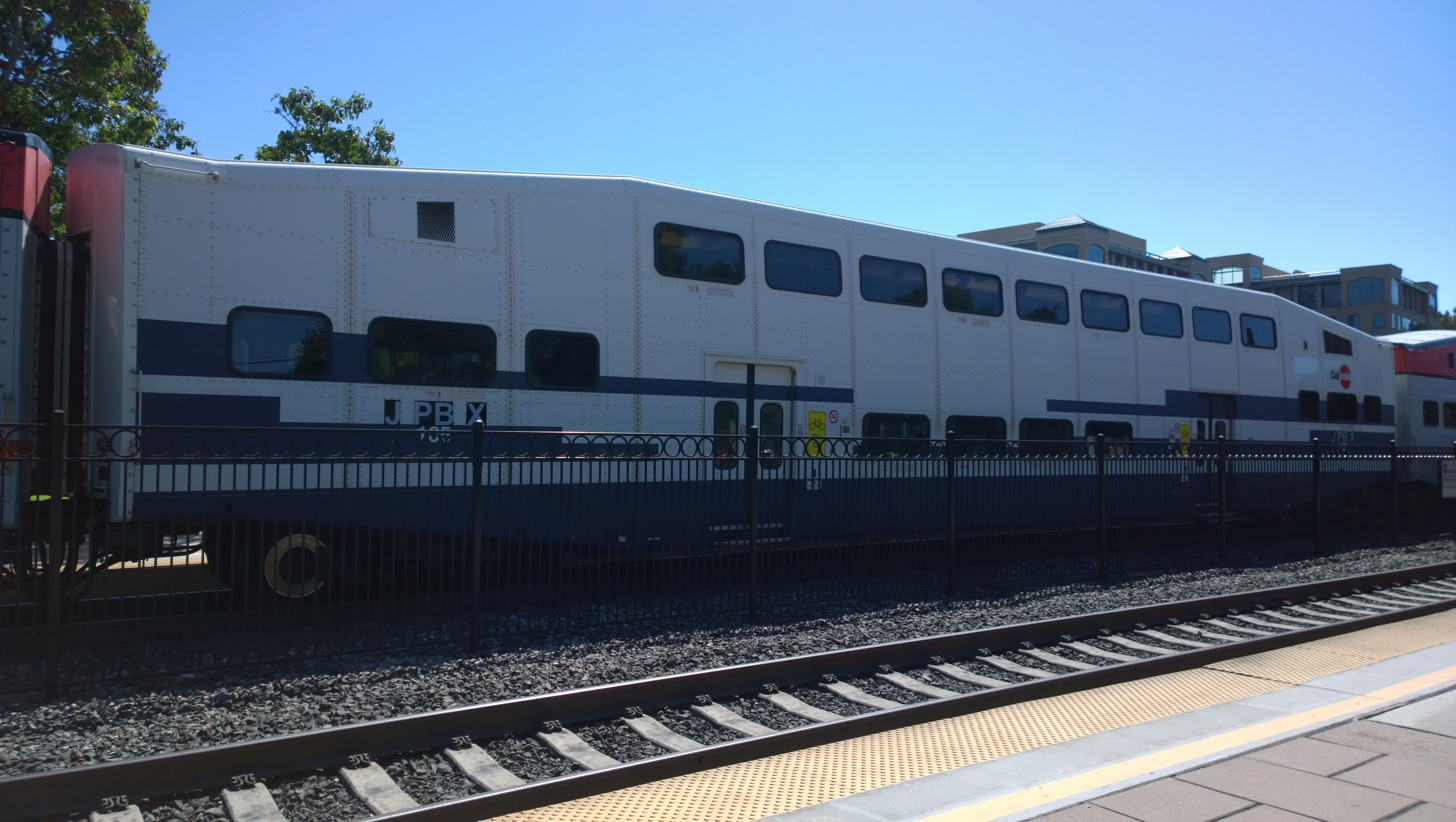
JPBX 165, an ex-Metrolink car in Caltrain service

Caltrain purchased 16 used Bombardier BiLevel Coaches from Metrolink in 2014 to cope with increasing ridership by lengthening certain Bombardier sets from five to six cars. The $15 million purchase was financed by a farebox revenue fund. Since the cars had retired from Metrolink service, they required rehabilitation before being placed in service with Caltrain. The ex-Metrolink cars were of older Series 1 and 2 that have riveted bodies, instead of the welded bodies in the Series 6 and 7 cars that Caltrain had purchased starting from 2002.

Ex-Metrolink cars retained their Metrolink blue-on-white livery, but Metrolink logos were painted over and rolling stock numbers were repainted with JPBX numbers. All five-car Bombardier sets were lengthened to six-car Bombardier sets using surplus ex-Metrolink cars in May 2015. In July 2016, six-car Bombardier sets replaced some five-car gallery sets to relieve overcrowding. In November 2016, Caltrain rolled out six-car gallery sets for certain trains to further relieve overcrowding; the longer trains were a temporary measure to increase capacity until more frequent service can be achieved with electrification.

After September 2024, electric multiple units displaced the legacy diesel locomotive and passenger car fleet for service between San Francisco and Tamien. The newer MPI diesel locomotives and bilevel passenger cars have been retained for service on the southern segment between San Jose and Gilroy. 19 locomotives and 90 gallery cars, built between 1985 and 1987, have been sold at a nominal price of US$6 million to Lima, Peru, and will be used in a new commuter rail service; the service is predicted to displace the equivalent of 4,000 cars per day between the eastern suburbs (Chosica) and the seashore (Callao) in the Lima metropolitan area.

Passenger Cars of Caltrain
Builder	Model	Type	Numbers	Quantity	Seats	Entered service	Left service	Notes	Image
Bombardier	Bi-Level	Trailer	220-226, 229-230	9	144	2002	present	220 & 226 built 2003. With accessible bathroom	Bombardier consist at San Jose Diridon station.
Bombardier	Bi-Level	Trailer	231-236	6	140	2008	present	220 & 226 built 2003. With accessible bathroom	Bombardier consist at San Jose Diridon station.
Bombardier	Bi-Level	Trailer	164; 165; 167; 169; 170-173; 175-182	16	149	2015	present	With accessible bathroom. Purchased from Metrolink. Originally built in 1997.	Bombardier consist at San Jose Diridon station.
Bombardier	Bi-Level	Cab-Bike	112-118	7	114	2002	present	With accessible bathroom	Bombardier consist at San Jose Diridon station.
Bombardier	Bi-Level	Cab-Bike	119-120	2	114	2008	present	With accessible bathroom	Bombardier consist at San Jose Diridon station.
Bombardier	Bi-Level	Cab-Bike	219	1	127	2002	present	With accessible bathroom	Bombardier consist at San Jose Diridon station.
Nippon Sharyo	Gallery	Trailer-Luggage	3800-3825	26	142	1985	2024	3819 written off as total loss in a 2022 accident and is likely to be preserved by the Midland Overwest Rail Preservation Society. 3842 built in 1987. Rebuilt by Nippon Sharyo 2001–02	Gallery cars at Millbrae
Nippon Sharyo	Gallery	Trailer-Bike	3826-3835	10	108	1985	2024	3819 written off as total loss in a 2022 accident and is likely to be preserved by the Midland Overwest Rail Preservation Society. 3842 built in 1987. Rebuilt by Nippon Sharyo 2001–02	Gallery cars at Millbrae
Nippon Sharyo	Gallery	Trailer	3836-3841	6	148	1985	2024	3819 written off as total loss in a 2022 accident and is likely to be preserved by the Midland Overwest Rail Preservation Society. 3842 built in 1987. Rebuilt by Nippon Sharyo 2001–02	Gallery cars at Millbrae
Nippon Sharyo	Gallery	Trailer	3842-3851	10	148	1986	2024	3819 written off as total loss in a 2022 accident and is likely to be preserved by the Midland Overwest Rail Preservation Society. 3842 built in 1987. Rebuilt by Nippon Sharyo 2001–02	Gallery cars at Millbrae
Nippon Sharyo	Gallery	Trailer	3852-3865	14	120	2000	2024	With wheelchair space and bathroom	Gallery cars at Millbrae
Nippon Sharyo	Gallery	Cab-Bike	4000-4020	21	97	1985	2024	With bathroom	Gallery cars at Millbrae
Nippon Sharyo	Gallery	Cab-Bike	4021-4026	6	78	2000	2024	With wheelchair space and bathroom	Gallery cars at Millbrae
Budd	Rail Diesel Car	Trailer	400-403; 406-407; 410-411; 413, 415, 425, 428	12		2000	2005	Built in 1952, acquired in 2000 for use on special event trains. Engine removed. Sold to Grand Canyon Railway in 2005.	
Budd	Rail Diesel Car	Cab-Control	1400, 1406	2		2000	2005	Built in 1952, acquired in 2000 for use on special event trains. Engine removed. Sold to Grand Canyon Railway in 2005.	

=== Miscellaneous/Maintenance-of-Way ===
Caltrain has several cars used for track maintenance, such as JPBX 505, a track geometry car. Some other rolling stock is infrequently used for special service, such as on the Holiday Train, an annual non-revenue train decorated with lights, carrying volunteer carolers, and making limited stops for toy donations. The annual event began in 2001. It is sponsored by the Silicon Valley Community Foundation.

Non-Revenue Rolling Stock of Caltrain
Builder	Model	Type	Numbers	Quantity	Year		Notes	Image
Builder	Model	Type	Numbers	Quantity	Entered service	Left service	Notes	Image
Budd	SPV-2000	Track geometry car	505	1	2007	present	Ex-Federal Railroad Administration (DOTX T-10)	Budd SPV-2000 at 4th and Townsend
		Caboose	598, 599	2	2000	present	Ex-SP Bay Window caboose, built 1974.	Cabooses at 4th and Townsend yard
		Flatcar	301–304	4	[data missing]	present		
		Flatcar	701–704	4	[data missing]	present	Built 1975.	
		Flatcar	711MW, 712MW	2	[data missing]	present	Formerly from Golden Gate Railroad Museum; generally used for Holiday Train.	Flatcars with Holiday Train decorations at 4th & Townsend
Max	E530	Gondola	851	1	[data missing]	present	Built 1976.	
		Ballast hopper	601–606	6	[data missing]	present	Built 1975 & 1976. Overhauled 2000.	
		Ballast hopper	11309, 11315, 11341	3	[data missing]	present	Built 1957.	
		Ballast hopper	11362, 11369, 11379	3	[data missing]	present	Built 1954.	
		Ballast hopper	11542, 11573, 11579	3	[data missing]	present	Built 1971.	
		Ballast hopper	11583, 11604, 11612, 11654, 11706, 11723	6	[data missing]	present	Built 1978.	
Difco	M110	Side dump	881–883	3	[data missing]	present	Built 1978.	

=== Equipment lease to Caltrans ===
In September 2025, Caltrain approved a 5-year lease with the option of purchase, of 3 MPI F40PH-2C locomotives, 13 Bombardier BiLevel trailer cars, and 3 Bombardier BiLevel cab cars to Caltrans in order to relieve equipment shortages on Amtrak California's Capitol Corridor and Gold Runner routes due to maintenances, repairs, and overhauls.

== Bicycle access ==
Bicycle car signage

"Bike Car" sign posted on gallery & bilevel cars

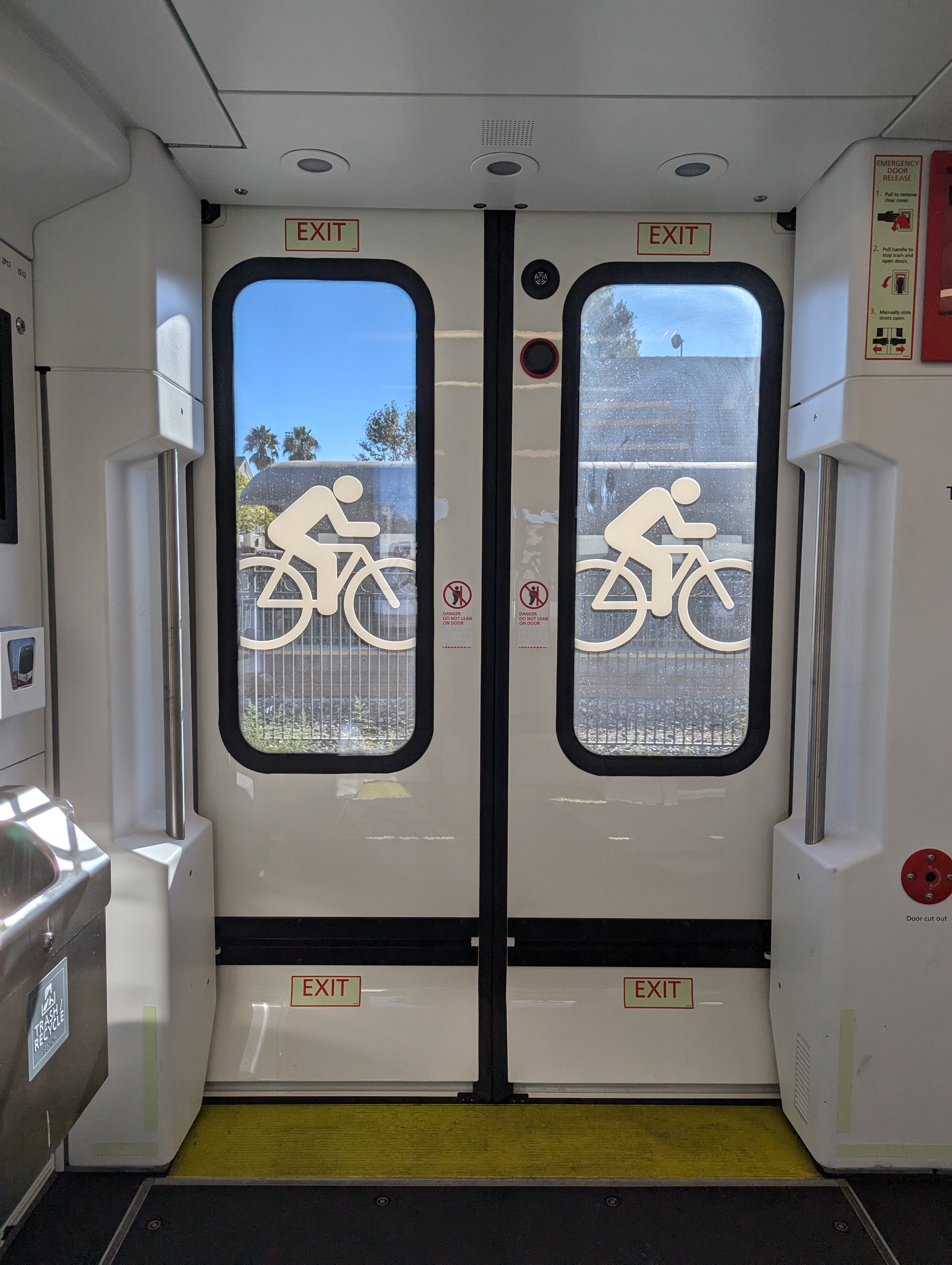
Bicycle graphics on EMU door windows

Caltrain was one of the first commuter rail services to add bicycle capacity to its trains, inaugurating bicycle service in 1992 by allowing four bikes on certain trains. By 2016, up to 80 bicycles could be carried per train in two or three bike cars. After the EMU fleet entered revenue service in 2024, each seven-car train has two bike cars.

=== Bicycle policies ===
Legacy gallery and bilevel passenger cars with bike racks have a yellow "Bike Car" sign posted on the exterior next to the door. EMU bike cars have white bicycles stenciled on the windows of the doors. Cyclists are required to tie their bicycle to the rack with the bungee cord provided, and must be racked so they do not protrude into the aisle. Each rack can accommodate four bicycles. Because the bikes are stacked together against the racks, most riders place a destination tag, available from a conductor, on their bicycles to optimize placement and minimize shuffling.

Cyclists must be at least six years old, and cyclists younger than 12 must be accompanied by an adult and capable of carrying their own bike on and off the train. Bicycles must be single-rider, with a maximum of 80 inches (2,000 mm) in length, and tandem or three-wheel bikes are not allowed. Bulky attachments such as training wheels, trailers, saddlebags, and baskets are similarly not allowed. Folding bicycles are not restricted and can be carried on any car when folded; they may not be placed on seats or block aisles.

=== History of bikes on Caltrain ===
Bicycle areas on Caltrain

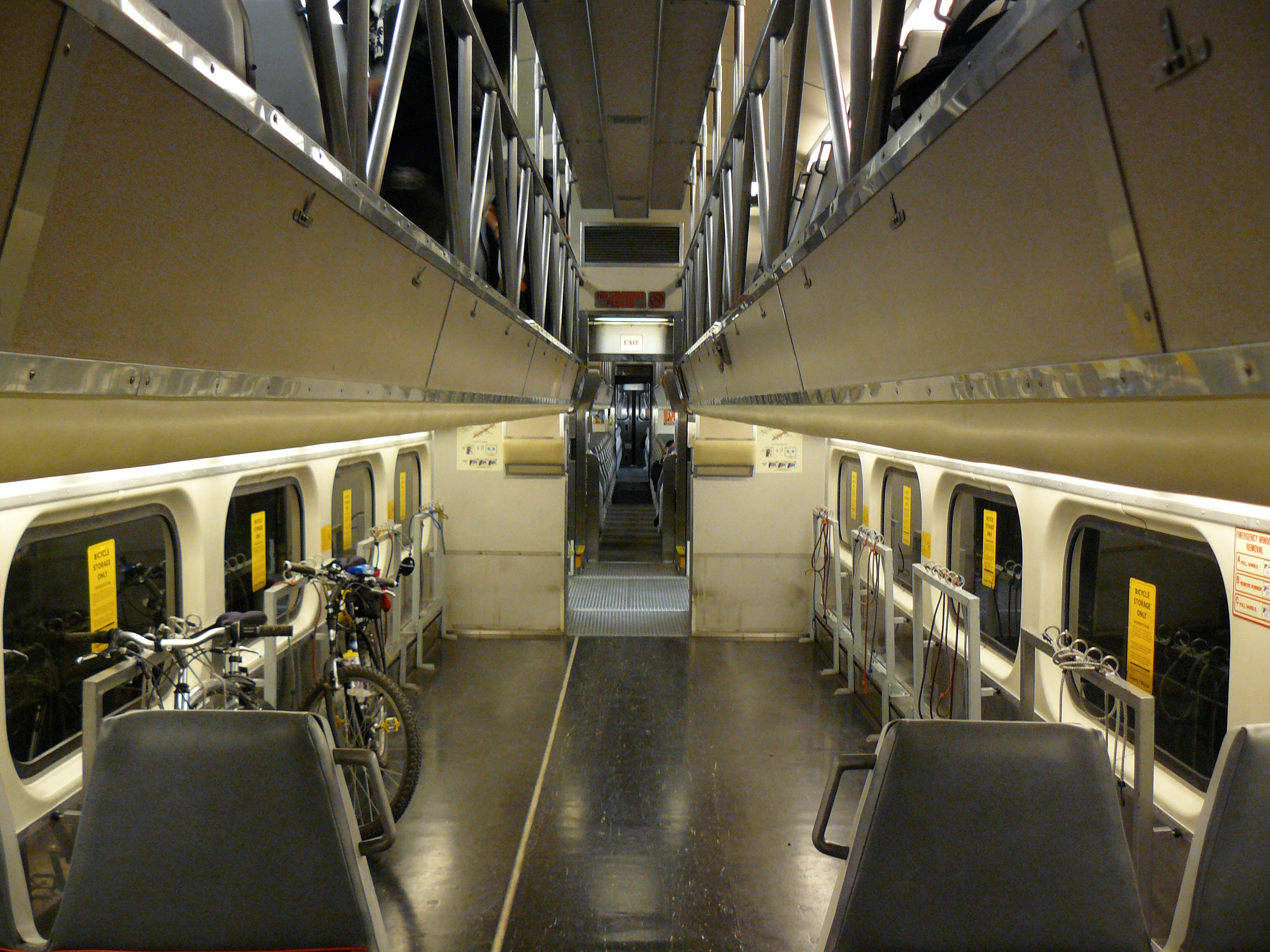
Caltrain gallery car, looking towards vestibule

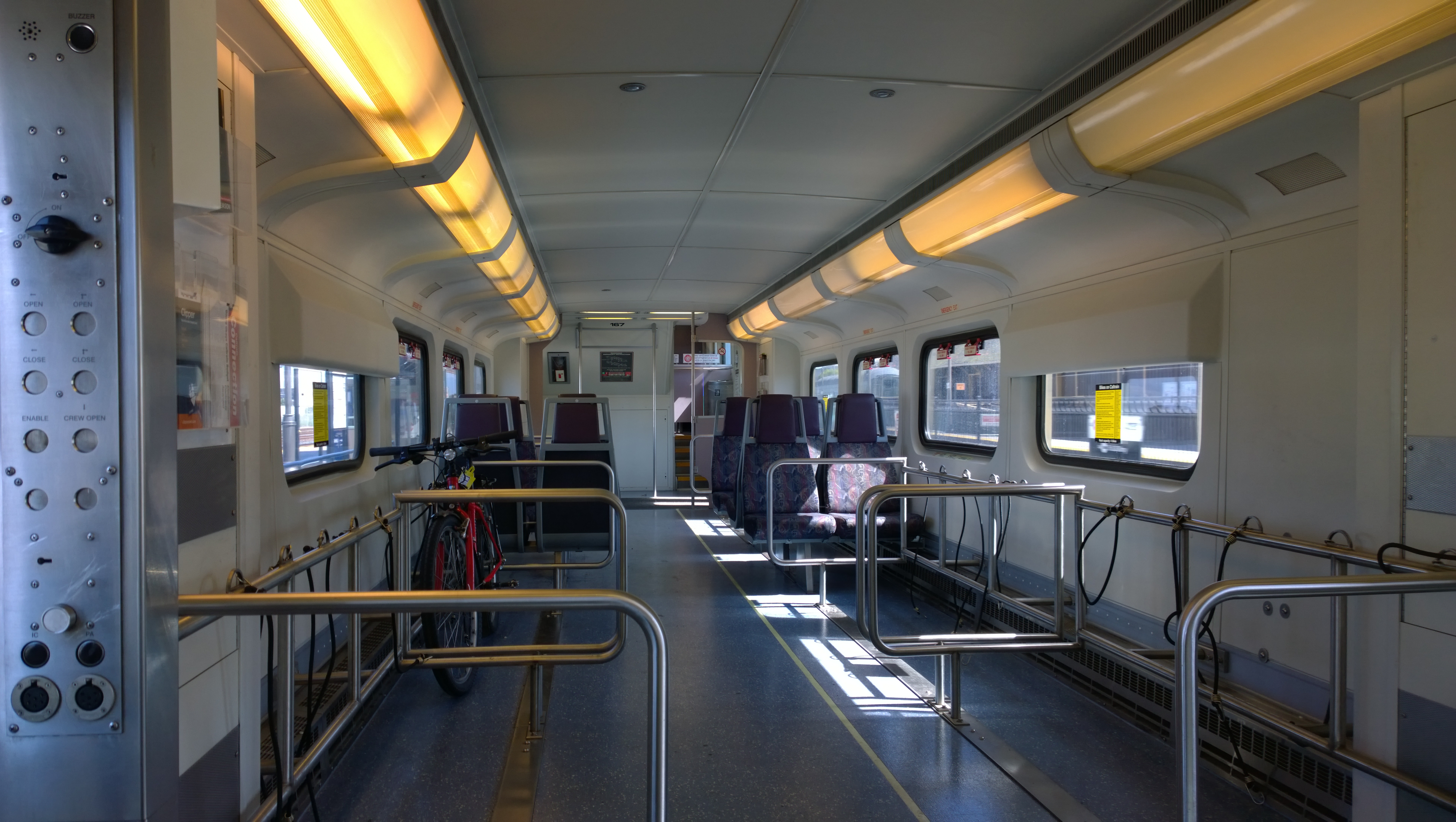
Caltrain Bombardier bilevel car (ex-Metrolink)

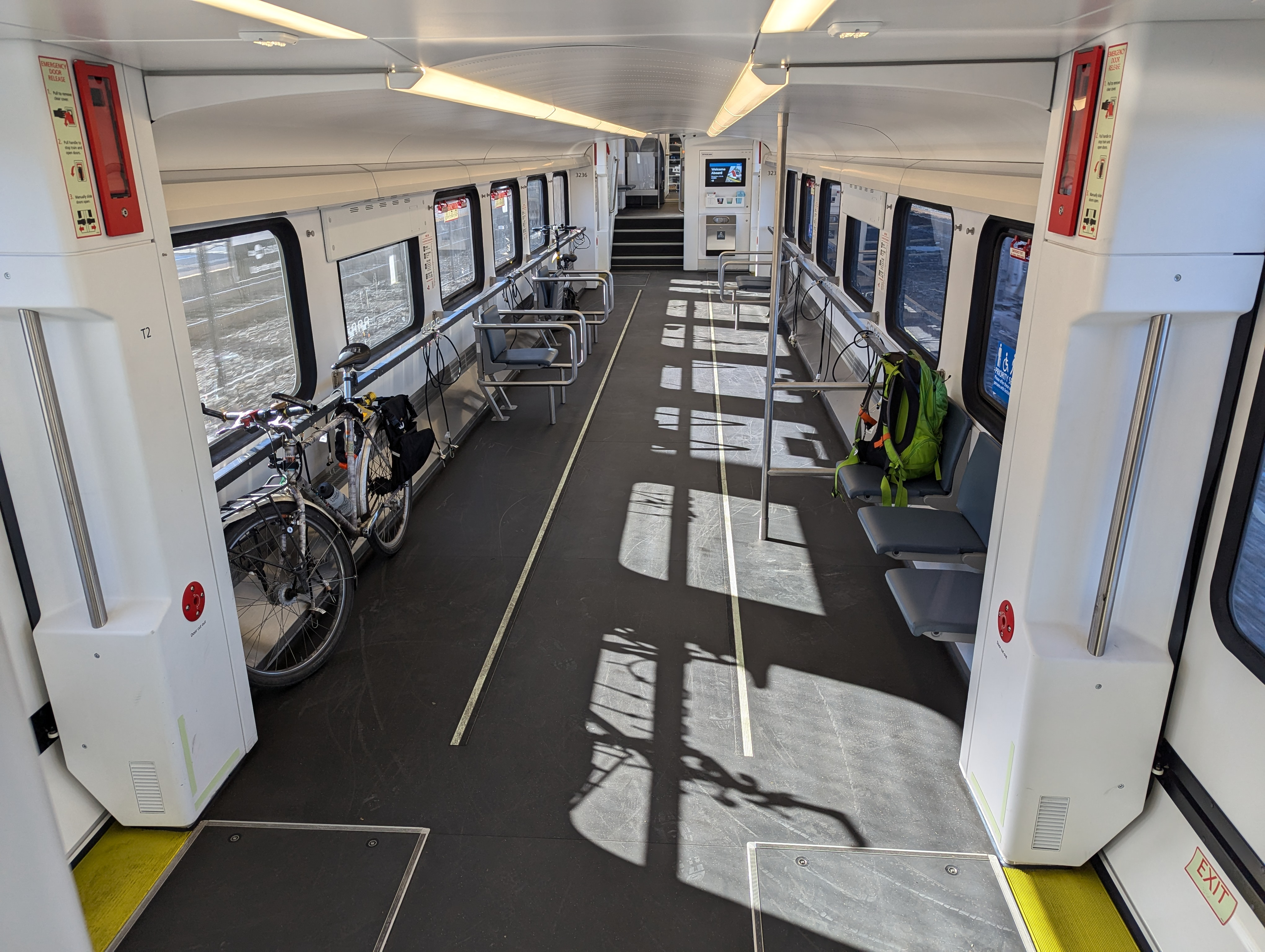
Caltrain Stadler KISS EMU

The initial pilot program launched in 1992 allowed up to four bikes per train for off-peak service, and bicycles were carried in the cab car (northernmost car). Bicycle capacity was expanded to twelve bikes per train for all trains in 1995, followed by a doubling to 24 bikes per train for all trains in 1996. Only the cab/control car of each train consist was modified for bicycle service.

Starting in 2001, additional gallery cars were modified for bicycle service. Gallery cars modified for bicycle service removed seats from the lower level in the north half of the car, resulting in space to carry 32 bicycles per car. By 2006, Bombardier cars were also modified for bicycle service by partially removing seats from the lower level of the car, resulting in space to carry 16 bicycles per car. Additional bicycle capacity was proposed by removing some seats from bicycle cars. Initially Caltrain rejected this idea because some trains are operated at seated capacity and the seat removal would take space from other passengers. However, in early 2009 Caltrain announced that it would be expanding bicycle capacity by 8 spots by removing some seats in the bike cars, bringing bike capacity to 40 bikes on gallery cars and 24 bikes on Bombardier cars. The expansion started several months later. After this, bike capacity on trains has been expanded by increasing the number of bike cars in a consist, rather than further modifying cars.

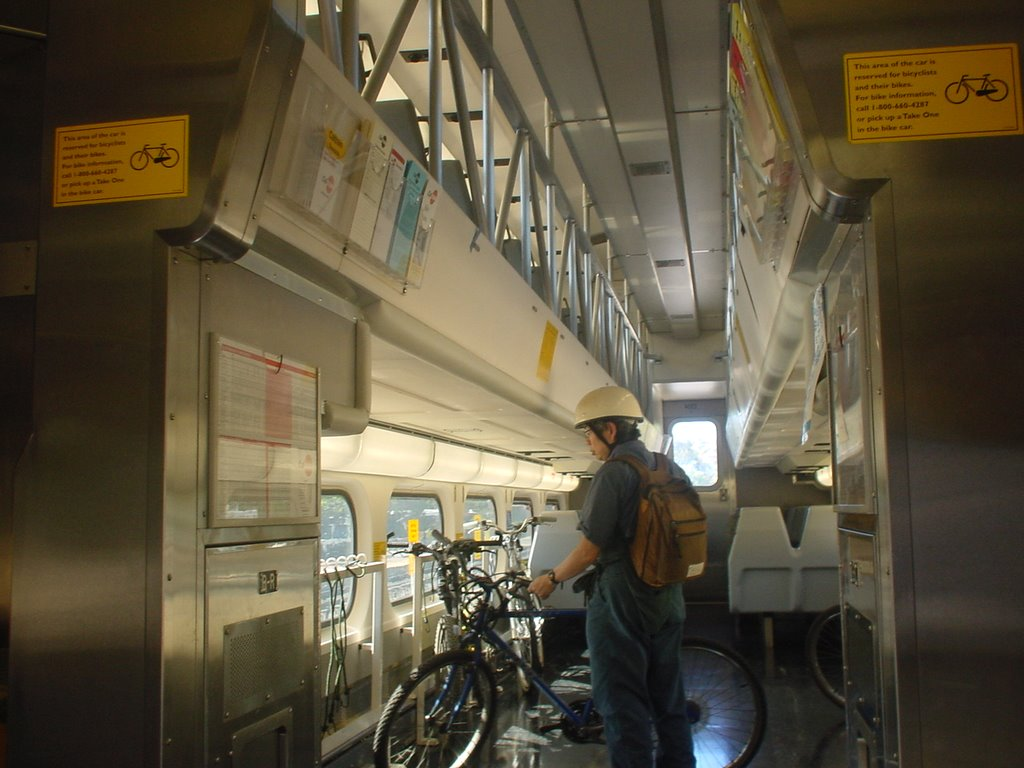
A passenger secures a bicycle onboard Caltrain gallery car

In fall 2009, all Bombardier consists and some gallery consists substituted a second bike car for one of the passenger trailers. The remaining gallery consists continued with a single bike car, resulting in a carrying capacity of 48 bicycles on Bombardier consists or 40–80 bicycles on gallery consists with one or two bike cars, respectively. Due to demand, in 2011, the remaining gallery sets modified a passenger trailer to take bicycles, giving two bike cars to all consists, increasing capacity on all gallery consists to 80 bicycles per train. 10 gallery trailer cars, 3826-3835, had their lower-level seats removed in 2011. Although the Baby Bullet runs initially used five-car Bombardier consists, many of the Baby Bullet runs returned to five-car gallery sets due to their superior bicycle capacity, since demand for bicycle car access was high.

Prior to 2016, both Bombardier and gallery trains used five-car consists. With the purchase of Bombardier cars from Metrolink, Caltrain announced in January 2015 that roughly half of the additional ex-Metrolink cars will be converted to bike cars with capacity for 24 bikes, so some trains running Bombardier cars will be six-car consists, of which three will be bike cars.

Six-car Bombardier consists started running in May 2015, but the third car was not converted for bike service until March 2016. At that time, five Bombardier cars were refurbished as bike cars, resulting in six-car sets equipped with three bike cars and three passenger cars. The third bike car was placed just south of the existing southern bike car to help conductors manage bike capacity. Official bike capacity for six-car Bombardier consists was 72 (24 bikes × 3 cars), comparable to the 80-bike capacity of five-car gallery consists (40 bikes × 2 cars).

The EMUs which began revenue service in 2024 have two bicycle cars with a total capacity of 72 bikes per train, carrying 36 bicycles in each car. Today, six-car Bombardier sets no longer run; the remaining cars now operate strictly on the San Jose to Gilroy segment of the route, typically as a three-car set featuring a single bike car.

=== Capacity issues ===
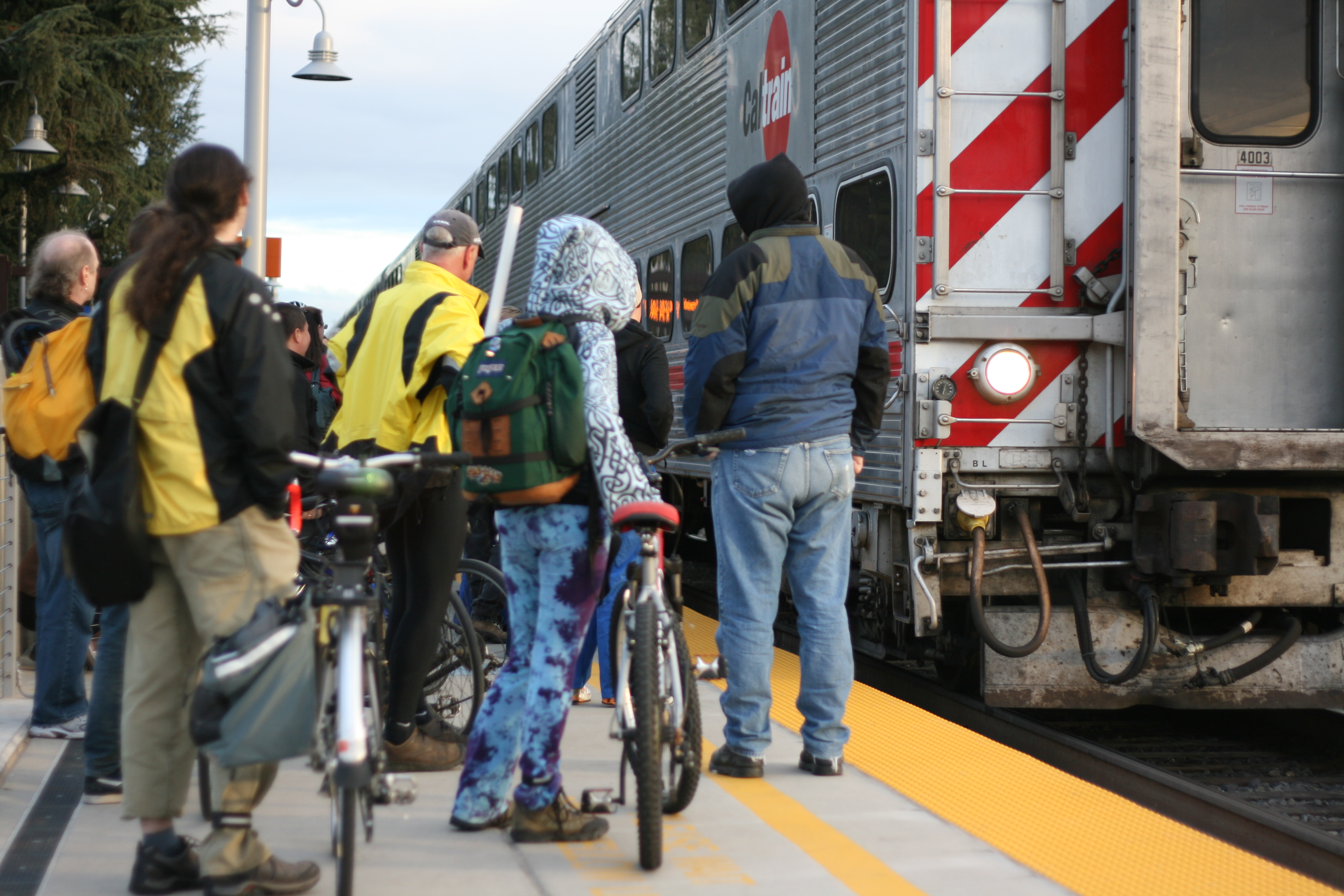
Bicyclists waiting to board Caltrain at Palo Alto station

The variation on bicycle capacity between trainsets generated criticisms from the bicycling community, as cyclists may be denied boarding when a train reaches its bicycle capacity. The Baby Bullets, favored by many cyclists, often used lower bike-capacity Bombardier cars and some cyclists had to wait for slower trains with higher-capacity gallery cars, or seek alternate transportation.

Due to equipment rotation and maintenance concerns, Caltrain said in 2009 that it could not dedicate cars with higher bike capacity on trains with high bike demand. Eventually, two bike cars were added to every train consist by 2011, and in 2016, a third bike car was added to Bombardier consists.

To provide an alternative to bringing bicycles on board the trains, Caltrain has installed bicycle lockers at most stations, and constructed a new bicycle station at the San Francisco station. In early 2008, Caltrain sponsored Warm Planet bicycle station opened at the 4th and Townsend terminus. A bicycle station was open at the Palo Alto station from April 1999 to October 2004, and reopened in February 2007. Nearly all stations have racks and/or lockers available to park bicycles.

== See also ==
- List of San Francisco Bay Area trains
- South Bay Historical Railroad Society
- Southern Pacific Peninsula Commute
- Southern Pacific Transportation Company
