= Caltrain Modernization Program =

Railway electrification project in California, US

CalMod

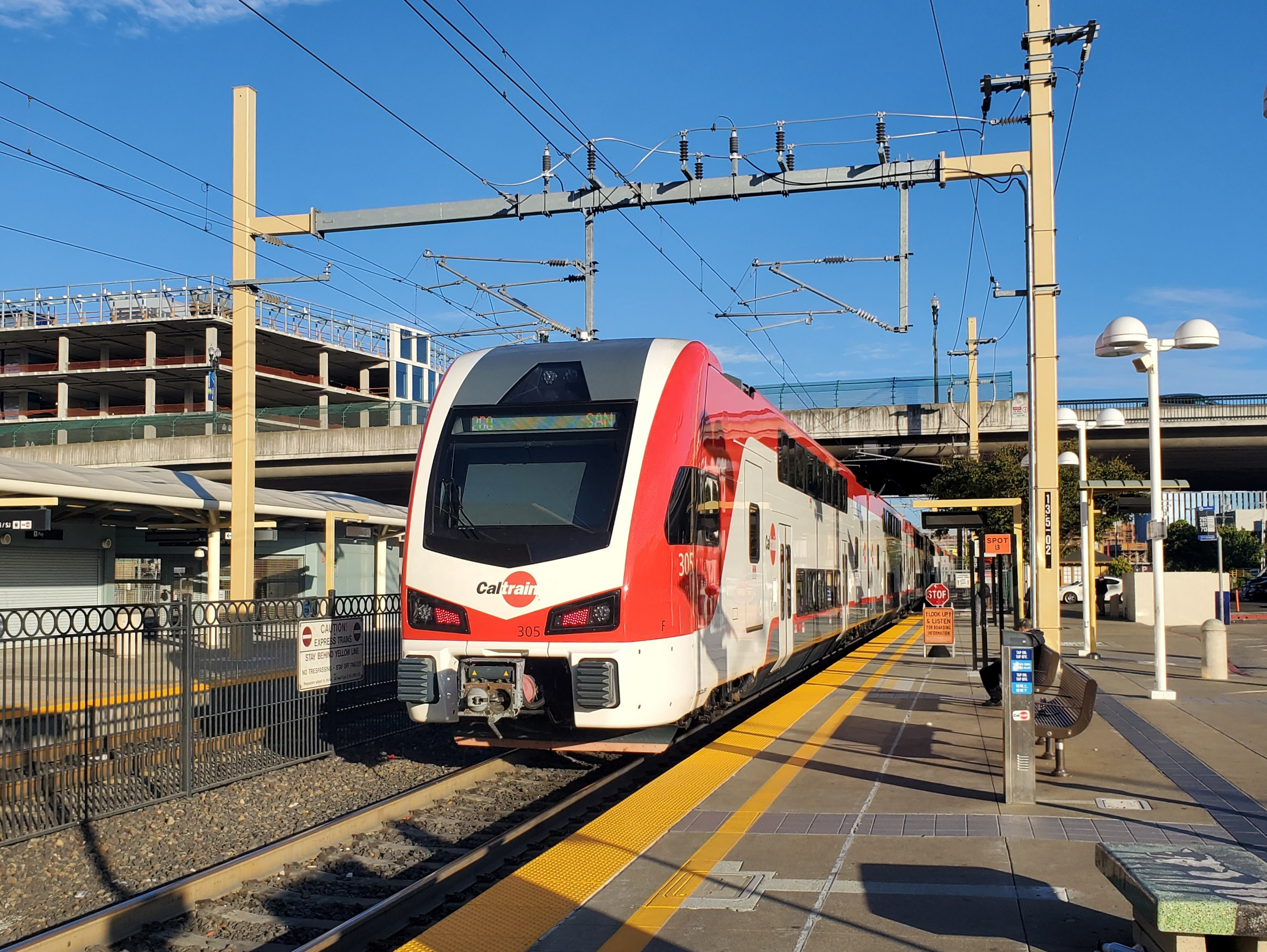
- A Caltrain KISS electric trainset in revenue service in August 2024
- Location: San Francisco Peninsula, California, U.S.
- Owner: Caltrain
- Established: July 21, 2017 (groundbreaking)
- Status: Operational
- Website: calmod.org

The Caltrain Modernization Program (CalMod), sometimes referred to as the Caltrain Electrification Project, was a $2.44 billion project which added a positive train control (PTC) system and electrified the main line of the U.S. commuter railroad Caltrain, which serves cities in the San Francisco Peninsula and Silicon Valley. The electrification included installation of a 25 kilovolt (kV) alternating current (AC) catenary system over the double-tracked line from San Francisco to San Jose, and acquisition of new rolling stock, consisting of Stadler KISS double-decker electric multiple units (EMU). Caltrain has transitioned from its legacy push-pull trains hauled by diesel-electric locomotives, most of which had been in service since 1985.

CalMod electrified 51 miles (82 km) of tracks between 4th and King station and Tamien station and installed a PTC management system along the tracks. PTC is designed to fulfill federal safety mandates for passenger rail and is part of the Federal Railroad Administration (FRA) waiver to use EMUs on tracks shared with freight traffic. Funding for the project came from various federal, state, and local sources, including from the California High-Speed Rail Authority (CHSRA).

Proposals for electrifying the line began as early as 1992 when the California Department of Transportation conducted an early feasibility study. For two decades, the project lay dormant due to lack of funding until Caltrain agreed to share its tracks with the CHSRA, which was looking for a route for the legally mandated San Jose–San Francisco segment. The Authority agreed to partially fund the electrification project in exchange for rights to share the track. Construction contracts for electrification were awarded in July 2016 and groundbreaking was expected to occur in March 2017, but was delayed when the new United States Secretary of Transportation Elaine Chao indefinitely deferred federal funding just before construction was about to begin. That same month, Caltrain removed the contractor responsible for implementing PTC for failure to perform on budget and schedule. In May 2017, the Federal Transit Administration (FTA) announced its intention to sign the grant and reversed Secretary Chao's deferment.

Construction for CalMod began with a groundbreaking ceremony at Millbrae station on July 21, 2017. The electrified corridor was fully energized in April 2024, and the Peninsula Corridor Electrification Project reached substantial completion on May 3, 2024, followed by final acceptance on December 20, 2024. Stadler KISS units began delivery in March 2022, and system testing started in June 2023. Caltrain began public revenue service using the Stadler EMUs on August 11, 2024, with two trainsets, adding more gradually until fully transitioning to all-electric trainsets on September 21. Some of the newer diesel locomotives and conventional passenger coaches were retained for service south of Tamien. Switching to EMUs was intended to improve service times via faster acceleration and shorter headways, and reduce air and noise pollution. CalMod also enabled planning and implementation to proceed for The Portal, a planned tunnel to extend Caltrain and future California High-Speed Rail service approximately 1 mi (1.6 km) to downtown San Francisco's Salesforce Transit Center.

== History ==
=== Background ===
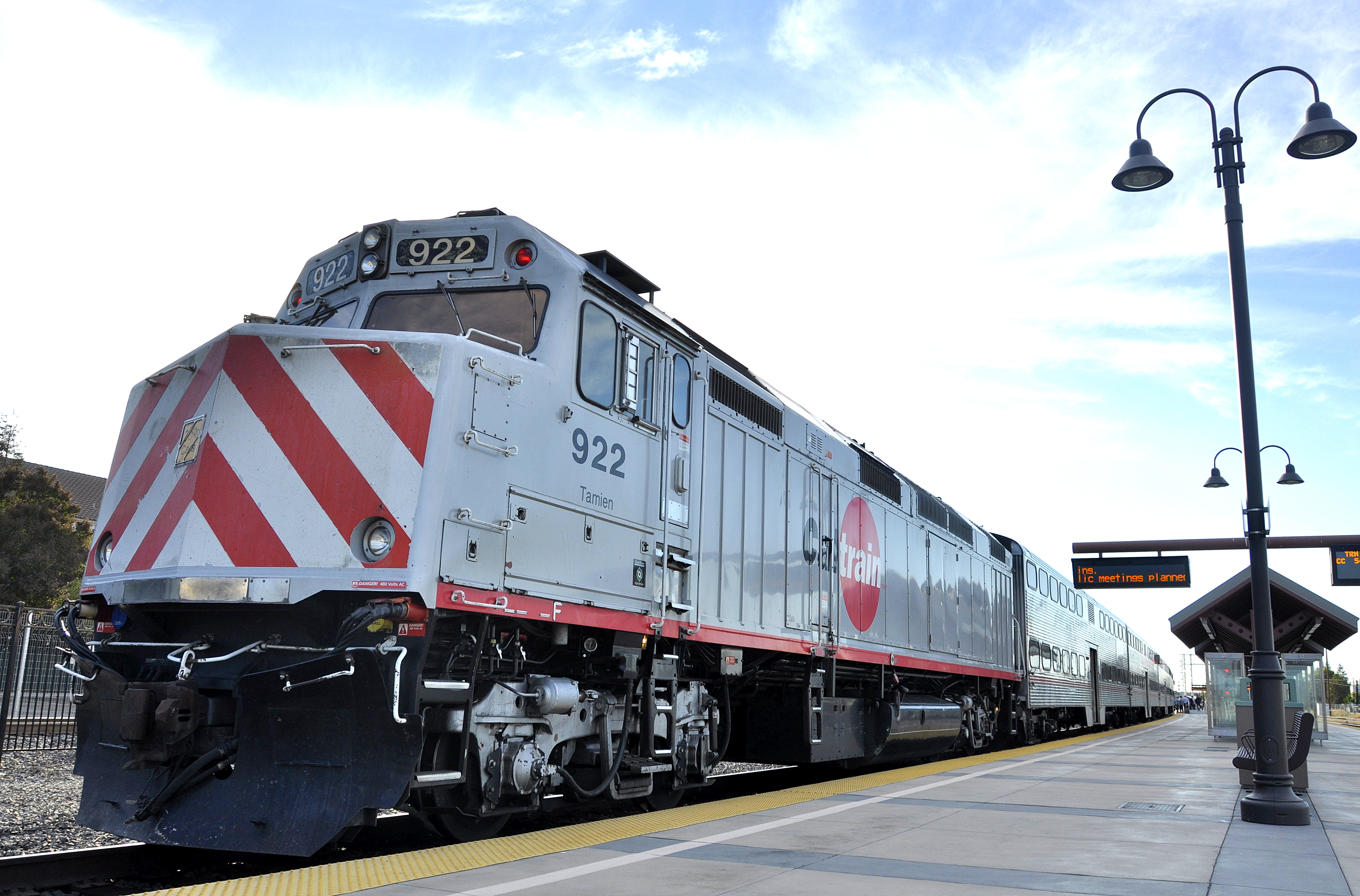
Commuter rail service along the San Francisco Peninsula had been using diesel locomotives (EMD F40PH pictured above) since the early 1950s; they were replaced with electric train sets in the 2020s.

Commuter railroad service on the San Francisco Peninsula was inaugurated in 1863 as the San Francisco and San Jose Railroad and purchased by Southern Pacific (SP) in 1870. SP announced that it would investigate the electrification of its line in September 1921, promising better and more frequent service. However, SP cited excessive post-war inflation, taxation, and competition from publicly funded highways as factors making electrification neither "practicable or desirable". In the early 1950s, SP began introducing diesel locomotives on the route. By 1977, Southern Pacific was facing rapidly declining ridership and petitioned the state Public Utilities Commission to allow them to discontinue the commuter rail operation. From 1980 until 1992, the California Department of Transportation (Caltrans) and the three service counties, San Francisco, San Mateo, and Santa Clara, subsidized Southern Pacific operations on the railway until the local Peninsula Corridor Joint Powers Board (PCJPB) acquired the right-of-way in 1991.

=== Early electrification proposals ===
In 1992, Caltrans released the first feasibility study detailing the possibility of electrifying the railroad between San Francisco and San Jose. The 1992 Feasibility Study proposed replacing the existing diesel-electric locomotives with either a fleet of EMD AEM-7 electric locomotives to move the existing gallery passenger cars or Metro North Budd M-2/M-4 EMUs. The primary benefits of an electrified railway would be improvements in air quality, noise, and acceleration, but would also save on other ancillary costs, such as lubricating oil, cooling water, maintenance, and refueling. Because of the relatively close spacing between stops, the improved acceleration using electric locomotives compared to the existing diesel-electric locomotives would cut transit time between San Francisco and San Jose by up to twelve minutes, and using EMUs would cut the time over the same distance by up to 23 minutes, assuming the use of ten-car trainsets. The 1992 Feasibility Study recommended the use of electric locomotives and 25 kV AC overhead lines as the most cost-effective alternative, since the gallery cars, which had been built in 1985, were then relatively new and could be reused.

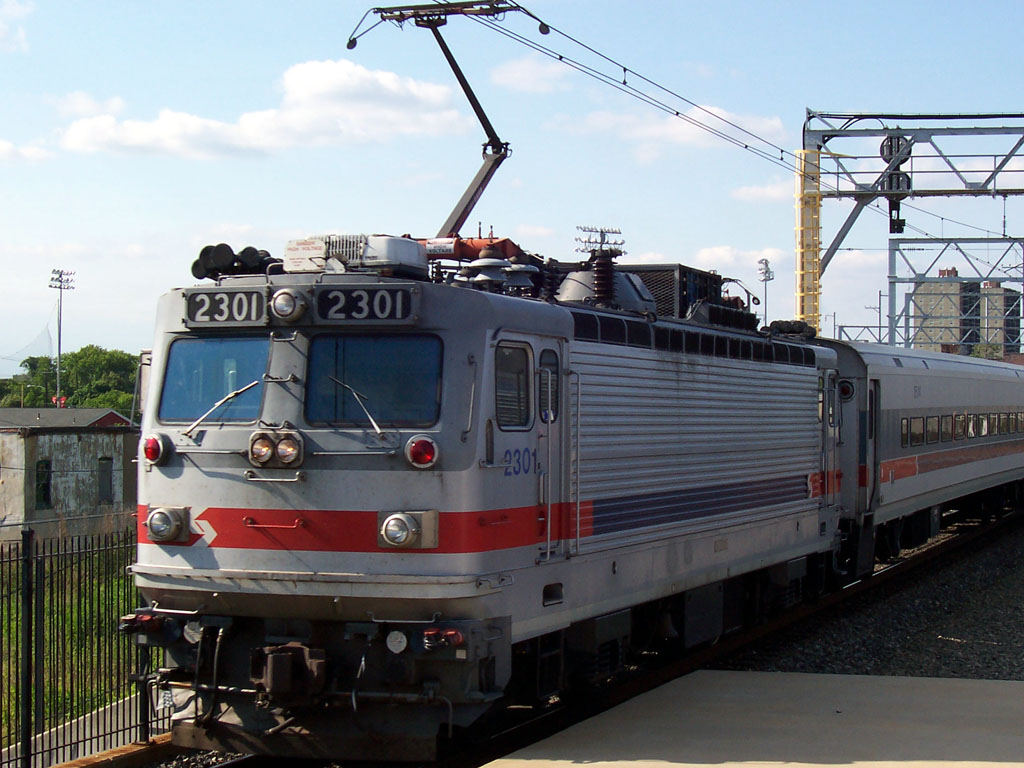
EMD AEM-7 electric locomotive, part of the equipment proposed in the 1992 Feasibility Study to electrify Caltrain. This AEM-7 is in revenue service with SEPTA.

Due to funding shortages, the project was postponed for the next two decades. In 1997, Mayor Willie Brown canceled the appropriation for San Francisco's share of costs to extend rail service to downtown, saying Peninsula residents "ought to fund the whole project" since it would mainly benefit their commute. San Francisco instead applied the money to the Third Street Light Rail Project. Mike Nevin, PCJPB member from San Mateo County noted that while the downtown extension "would have enhanced particularly the electrification of the system", lack of it would not cause Caltrain to collapse. Instead, Caltrain studied a list of potential upgrades and went on to publish a draft Rapid Rail Study on October 1, 1998, which prioritized capital improvements to the physical infrastructure with the overarching goal of expanding rail service. At that time, Caltrain was reporting daily ridership of approximately 25,000 passengers, a 40-year high.

The 1998 Rapid Rail Study assumed that ridership would increase in direct proportion to improving travel times. The study concluded that in order to meet the five goals presented in the 20-Year Strategic Plan of 1997, Caltrain should first rehabilitate and enhance the line, then electrify it. By itself, electrification was not projected to significantly improve service, and the high estimated cost of electrification and its lower priority meant electrification would be deferred. Some of the money to accomplish the rehabilitation and enhancement of existing track came from funds that had been intended for the downtown extension. Steve Schmidt, a councilman from Menlo Park, argued that electrification instead should be the top priority to make the rail line more palatable to neighbors, citing improvements in noise and pollution. Other advocates for electrification of Caltrain noted the $1.2 billion BART extension to San Francisco International Airport may have revived the decades-old dream of BART around the Bay, which would render an electrified Caltrain redundant. The electrification of Caltrain was assigned a higher priority than a future expansion of the system, which included proposals to bring service to Union City across the Dumbarton Rail Bridge as well as increased service to Gilroy and Salinas. Under the latest proposal to revive rail service over the Dumbarton Rail Corridor, diesel multiple units would first be used to establish Dumbarton Rail service as a rail shuttle between a new rail station in Newark and Caltrain's Redwood City station, later extending service from Newark to Union City, and finally followed by a commuter rail operation running from Union City to San Francisco and San Jose using EMUs.

In 2003, The San Francisco County Transit Authority proposed Proposition K in San Francisco, a local transportation sales tax. Voters were given an expenditure plan estimating the total cost of Caltrain electrification as $183.5 Million with San Francisco's share costing $20.5M, met with Proposition K, which passed.

=== Caltrain/HSR blended system ===
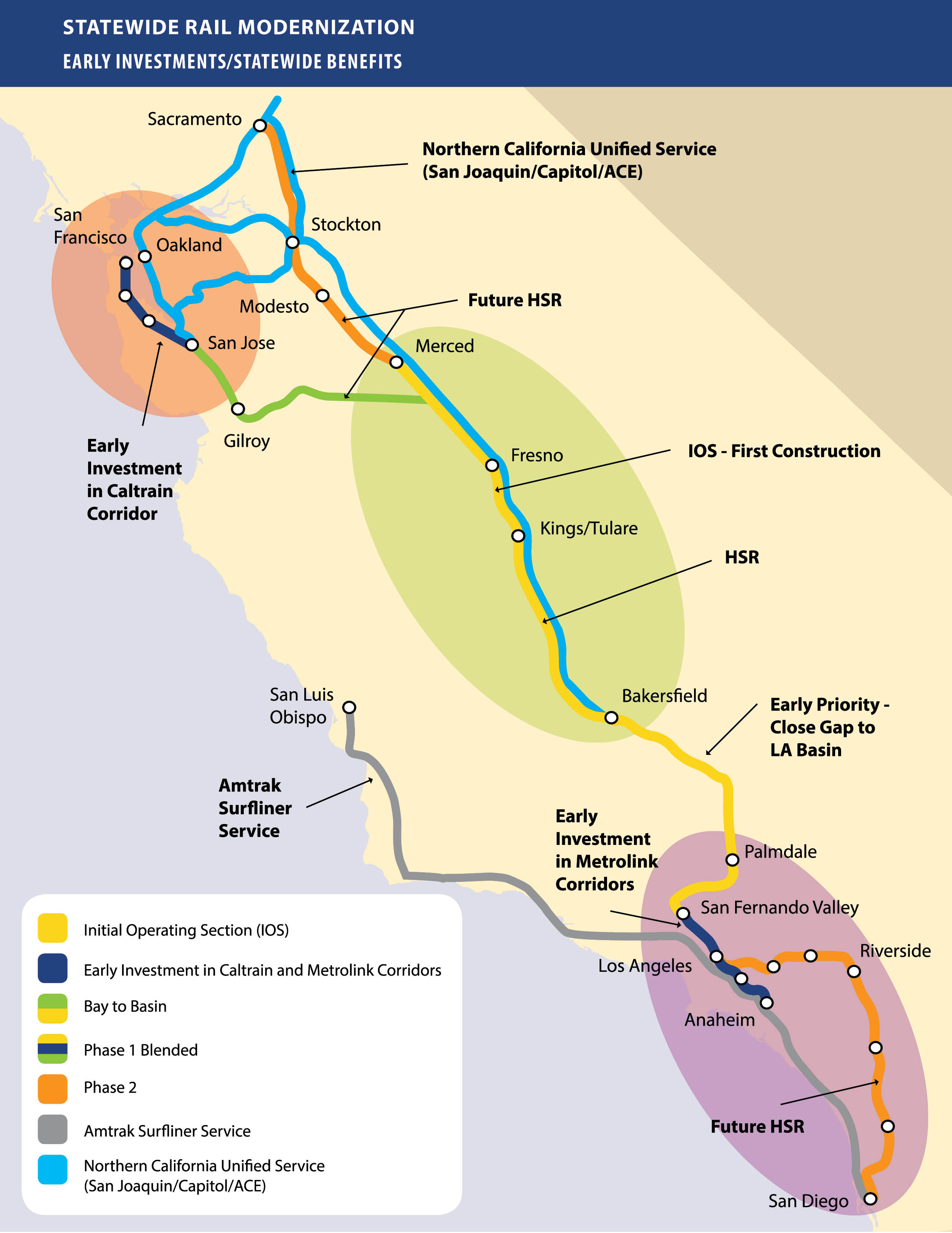
The first phase of California's high-speed rail project includes funding for public transit systems along its route, including Caltrain.

Despite increasing ridership, Caltrain experienced a budget crisis in 2011 that nearly forced it to cut service to peak commute hours only, while funding sources for electrification remained unidentified. At the same time, the California High-Speed Rail Authority (CHSRA) was having trouble identifying a route from San Jose to San Francisco in the face of local opposition. In response, U.S. Representative Anna Eshoo, State Senator Joe Simitian, and Assemblymember Rich Gordon announced a "blended" plan to partially fund electrification with high-speed rail money in return for allowing high-speed rail trains to share tracks in the future. Later, Caltrain announced that it had studied the plan and believed it to be feasible.

Under a proposed agreement between Caltrain and the CHSRA, details of which were leaked in February 2012, up to $1 billion could be available from the high-speed rail project to help fund the CalMod project, including the positive train control system (dubbed "CBOSS"), electrification of the infrastructure, and elimination of some grade crossings. Under the agreement, the Peninsula Corridor would become eligible for high-speed rail money because the planned routing to San Francisco would use the same lines. This was one of two investments in "bookend" electrification projects, which were intended to upgrade existing passenger rail services near the planned CHSRA San Francisco and Los Angeles terminals to allow high-speed rail to share infrastructure. In March 2012, Caltrain and other local agencies signed a memorandum of understanding with the CHSRA that detailed the blended plan, which received approval from the Metropolitan Transportation Commission a week later.

Under the memorandum, $706 million from the high-speed rail bond would be matched by state, regional, and local transportation funds to pay for the estimated $1.5 billion needed for CalMod. However, since the bonds had not yet been issued, the money was not available, and a prior environmental impact report that had been issued for electrification in 2009 needed to be reissued before construction could start. In September 2012, the California Transportation Commission released $39.8 million to modernize CBOSS. A month later, the expected funding from high-speed rail bonds rose to $1.5 billion, which alongside electrification provided funding for the planned Downtown Extension (DTX), which would move the northern terminus of the Caltrain line from 4th and King to the Salesforce Transit Center. CHSRA approved the issue of bonds in December 2016. Critics of high-speed rail felt the slower trips and reduced service caused by "blending" the two systems over the Peninsula Corridor did not meet the original voter-approved vision of a quad-track line between San Francisco and Los Angeles, and ridership would never meet projections.

=== Lawsuits ===
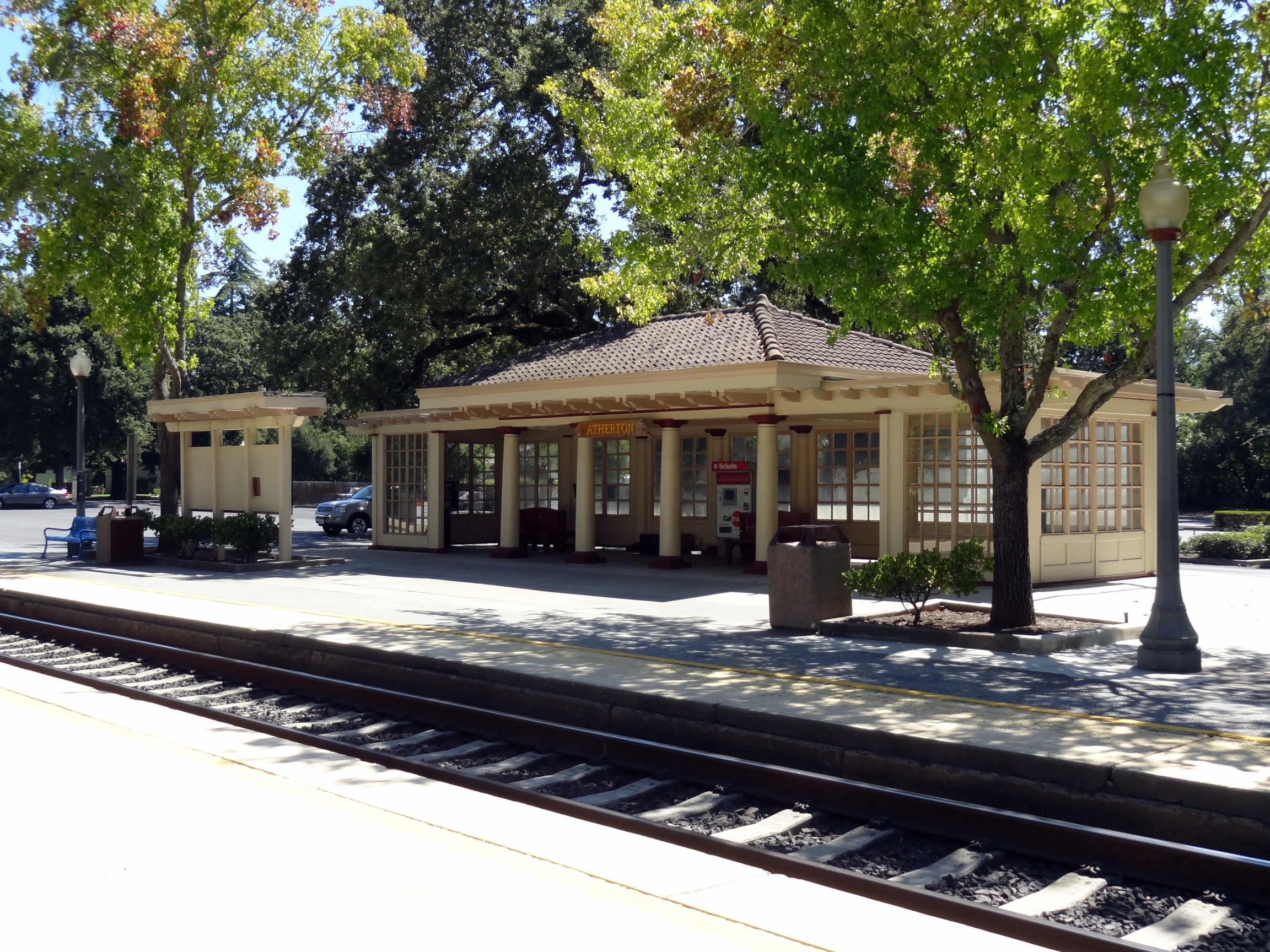
The southbound platform of the Atherton station. The town of Atherton has backed litigation against Caltrain's electrification plans.

The town of Atherton, which lies on the tracks, was an early and vocal opponent of electrification. Residents opposed electrification and the proposed high-speed rail route because the overhead electrical lines would require tree removal and the town could potentially be divided in two by permanently closing the two grade crossings at Fair Oaks Lane and Watkins Avenue.

In February 2015, shortly after the project received environmental clearance from the state, Atherton sued Caltrain, alleging the agency's environmental impact review was inadequate and that its collaboration with the CHSRA should be further vetted. In July 2015, the suit proceeded after Caltrain's request to the Surface Transportation Board to exempt it from California Environmental Quality Act (CEQA) guidelines was denied. Atherton reiterated its opposition to electrification on the basis that overhead wires would require removing a significant number of heritage trees, and city representatives asserted that "newer, cleaner, more efficient diesel trains" should supplant plans for "century-old catenary electrical line technology". Atherton mayor Rick De Golia was quoted as saying "Caltrain is locked into an old technology and 20th century thinking". After Caltrain issued infrastructure and rolling stock contracts in July 2016, Atherton representatives did not file a temporary restraining order to halt those contracts, preferring to let the suit proceed to a hearing. In September 2016, Contra Costa County Superior Court Judge Barry Goode sided with Caltrain, ruling that the electrification project did not hinge on the high-speed rail project's success, and was thus independent from the latter.

Indeed, at bottom [California High-Speed Rail] is providing funds to Caltrain while hoping that the rest of CHSRA's plans work out well enough that, someday, it can bring the blended system to fruition. But if CHSRA is unable to do that, Caltrain will still have a successful project. Put another way, HSR may need to have Caltrain's Electrification Project completed. But Caltrain does not need to have High Speed Rail completed for the Electrification Project to be a success.

— Judge Barry Goode, 2016 ruling

Atherton sued CHSRA again in December 2016, stating that using bond money intended for high-speed rail for CalMod was a material change in usage and therefore was unconstitutional because such a change would require voter approval first. In response, the California Legislature allowed the funding to be redirected by passing Assembly Bill No. 1889, which had been championed by Assemblymember Kevin Mullin in 2015. Mullin noted "this entire Caltrain corridor is the epicenter of the innovation economy and it's a job creation and economic engine. This electrification project, I would argue, is monumental with regard to dealing with [increased traffic and environmental impacts] effectively and efficiently."

=== Contracts awarded ===
Parsons Transportation Group was awarded a $138 million contract in November 2011 to design and install CBOSS by October 2015. Parsons began physical work on CBOSS in September 2013, starting with the installation of a fiber optic line along the Caltrain right-of-way. The Federal Railroad Administration (FRA) approved Caltrain's plans in 2014 and Caltrain noted that CBOSS was due to enter revenue service by the end of 2015. Because Caltrain had multiple goals for CBOSS, including increased safety, improved operational efficiency, and ensured interoperability with other rail providers (Caltrain shares tracks with Union Pacific, Altamont Corridor Express, and Amtrak), implementation was challenging and Caltrain, the busiest commuter rail service on the West Coast, still had not fully implemented the system by the end of 2016.

The Peninsula Corridor Electrification Project (PCEP) draft environmental impact report was released in February 2014. After addressing comments received, PCJPB certified the final environmental impact report in January 2015. A pre-qualification survey was sent out in May 2014, and six firms were pre-qualified to bid on PCEP construction, which was eventually awarded to Balfour Beatty Construction.

In July 2016, Caltrain's Board of Directors awarded contracts to Balfour Beatty and Stadler Rail to construct infrastructure for the electric trains and the electric trains themselves, respectively. Balfour Beatty was awarded a $697 million contract, its largest contract in the United States, to electrify the line at 25 kV AC, replace signaling systems, construct two traction power substations, one switching substation, and seven paralleling substations. The Swiss firm Stadler was awarded a $551 million contract to deliver 96 of their "KISS" bilevel electric multiple unit cars, formed into 16 six-car trains. Under the contract, Caltrain held an option to increase the order by an additional 96 cars. The contract also marked the first American design win for the Stadler KISS. Stadler broke ground for a new factory near the Salt Lake City International Airport on October 13, 2017. The first trains were scheduled for delivery in August 2019. The first two trainsets arrived at Caltrain on March 20, 2022.

In April 2016, after missing the initial October 2015 deadline, Caltrain requested a third party review of the CBOSS project from the American Public Transportation Association (APTA). APTA noted that Caltrain was not effectively managing the project schedule and cost because of generally poor communication between Caltrain's project management and Parsons, and Caltrain's project manager did not have the technical experience or authority to resolve technical and contractual issues with Parsons. In February 2017, Caltrain terminated its contract with Parsons for failure to perform on time and budget and announced potential litigation. Parsons filed suit on February 22, saying delays were due to changing client requirements and circumstances beyond their control. Caltrain filed suit a week later, seeking $98 million in damages; although the system had been mostly installed, testing was still incomplete.

The plan to complete the installation of positive train control (PTC) was presented to PCJPB in early 2018. At the March 1, 2018 meeting, the PCJPB awarded the $49.5 million contract to complete PTC to Wabtec. The switch to Wabtec implemented I-ETMS technology, which was evaluated to be "the only technically and financially viable" solution to completing PTC before the FRA's deadline of December 31, 2018. Approximately 80% of the equipment for CBOSS that had already been installed was able to be reused, and FRA approved a revised schedule in January 2019 to implement PTC by December 2020.

=== Federal funding interruption ===
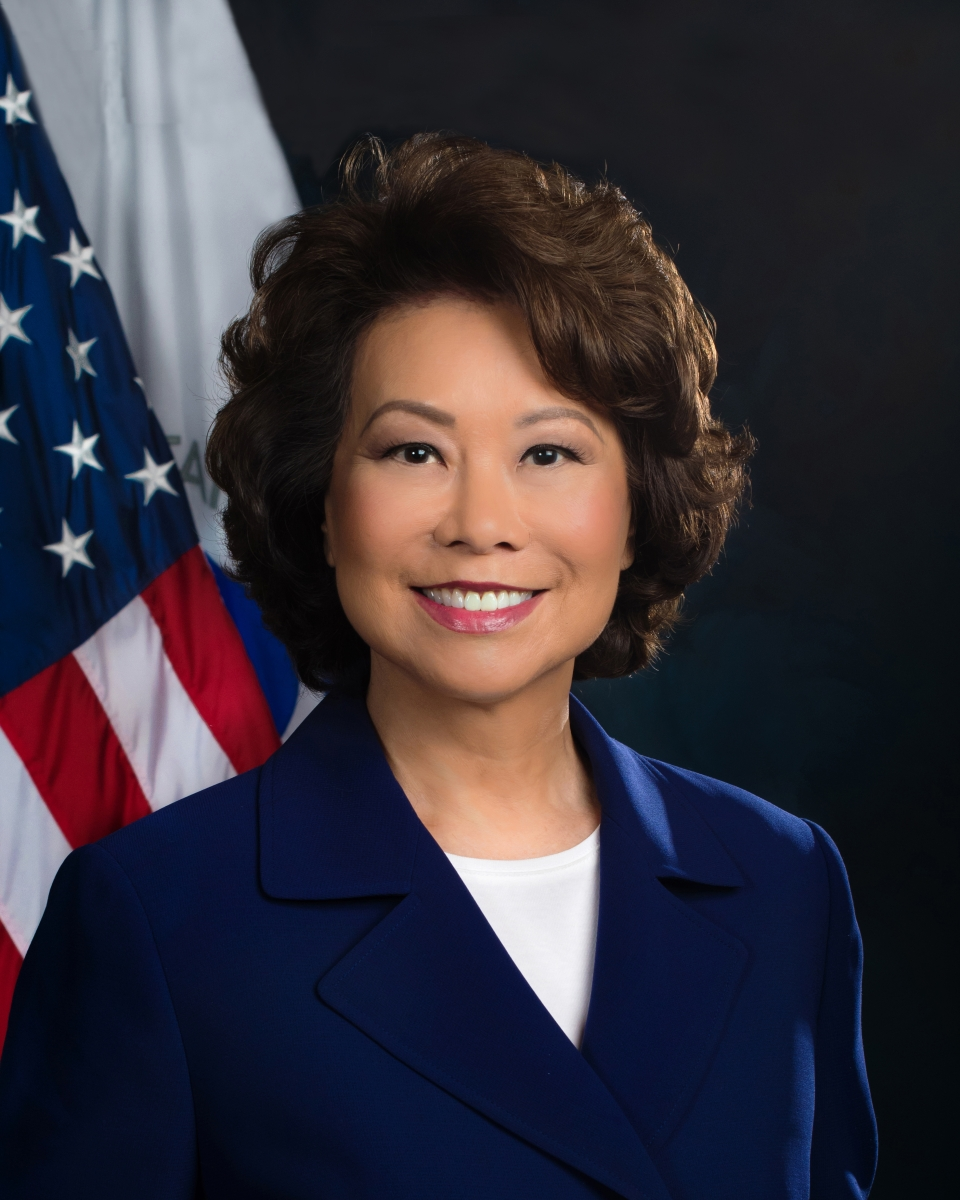
Secretary of Transportation Elaine Chao deferred expected federal funding for the electrification project just before construction was about to commence.

In early 2016, the CHSRA had selected a route that required extensive and costly tunneling in Southern California and revised its initial operating plans for high-speed rail to include the Bay Area. By February 2017, the electrification project had secured $1.3 billion in state, local, and regional funding, with the remaining funding gap to be closed by a $647 million grant from the FTA's Core Capacity program. The grant had undergone a two-year review process starting in November 2015 under the Obama Administration and received a "medium-high" rating from the FTA in August 2016, and was waiting for a signature from the newly appointed Trump Administration Secretary of Transportation Elaine Chao after a 30-day review period to secure a grant approval. However, during the review period, the fourteen Republican party U.S. House representatives from California sent a letter to Secretary Chao, urging her to deny funding due to the project's ties with high-speed rail, which they opposed. The letter went on to call the project "an irresponsible use of taxpayer dollars".

The Sacramento Bee pointed out that despite regularly soliciting campaign funds from Silicon Valley business leaders, Representative and House Majority Leader Kevin McCarthy, the author of the Republican letter to Secretary Chao, was targeting a project that benefited the region directly. Another Republican signatory, Representative Devin Nunes, was unmoved by arguments on infrastructure benefits, saying in late February that he would not "feel too bad about one of the richest places on the planet not having a train." Fellow Republican Representative Jeff Denham defended the letter, saying Caltrain's electrification project and CHSRA were closely intertwined because the former derived some funding under the "blended plan" agreement. Representative Tom McClintock reiterated his opposition to high-speed rail without addressing Caltrain: "I have never supported a dollar of state funding going for [high-speed rail], and would never support a dollar of federal funding". Representative Mimi Walters also made a statement that she was not opposed to electrification, but instead held "serious concerns about the use of taxpayer funds for a project that is tied to high speed rail".

The 39-member House and Senate Democratic congressional delegation from California wrote a rebuttal letter to Secretary Chao on February 3, noting "a material misstatement of fact" in the Republican delegation's letter, which stated that the grant was being sought by the CHSRA, while in reality it was being sought by Caltrain. The rebuttal letter further delineated the separation between the electrification project and CHSRA and urged Secretary Chao to approve the grant by citing past precedent that only one low-rated project failed to receive a signature from the Secretary of Transportation over the prior twenty-year history of the Core Capacity program. The Democratic letter went on to note the infrastructure benefits of the project and the creation of 9,600 jobs, including 550 jobs at a new Stadler USA plant in Salt Lake City.

In the end, Secretary Chao heeded the Republican letter's arguments, and deferred the grant in a letter written by FTA Executive Director Matthew Welbes to Caltrain which stated the FTA needed "additional time to complete review of this significant commitment of Federal resources". Caltrain had expected Secretary Chao to approve the grant and sign the grant agreement by March 1, which is normally a pro forma step performed after the thirty-day comment period for a highly rated project, and had already awarded construction contracts. Balfour Beatty Construction and Stadler Rail had already begun preparations to upgrade the existing tracks and build electrical trainsets, respectively. Caltrain negotiated an emergency four-month contract extension at a potential cost of $20 million. Under the preliminary budget proposal released in mid-March 2017, the United States Department of Transportation's Capital Investment Grant Program would be eliminated, although approved projects would continue to be funded. Since Secretary Chao had withheld grant approval for the electrification project, its future fell into doubt.

In response to the grant deferral, various local officials traveled to Washington, D.C., to lobby federal officials to release the money. Editorials in local and national newspapers urged approval of the grant, including the Sacramento Bee, which called the deferral "a petty attack", the East Bay Times, a noted CHSRA detractor, and The New York Times, which called the delay "counter to Mr. Trump's campaign promises of increased infrastructure spending." Henry Grabar noted the grant deferral could be "an early test of a simmering fear that the state's outspoken political opposition to the Trump administration might come with a price". San Jose Mayor Sam Liccardo met with Department of Transportation officials, urging them to upgrade a system that "was built under the presidency of Abraham Lincoln". Additionally, more than 120 Silicon Valley business leaders sent a letter to Secretary Chao, asking her to explain "the last-minute attempt to derail two decades of work". In early March, California Governor Jerry Brown sent a letter to Secretary Chao, asking to discuss the funding grant, and subsequently met with Secretary Chao and Representative McCarthy, urging them to reconsider the funding deferral, saying afterward that he was "cautiously optimistic" that the money would be released.

On April 30, legislators in the U.S. Congress released the proposed 2017 federal budget, which included partial funding for the electrification project, but restricts its distribution unless Secretary Chao signs off on the grant. The proposed budget includes $100 million of the $647 million grant, with the balance expected in future years. Secretary Chao claimed she could not sign the grant without the full grant being budgeted, which was disputed by Caltrain and both California Senators Dianne Feinstein and Kamala Harris. On May 22, the FTA announced its intent to sign the funding grant, restoring the final piece of funding for the electrification project. The official grant was finally signed on May 23.

=== Construction and testing ===
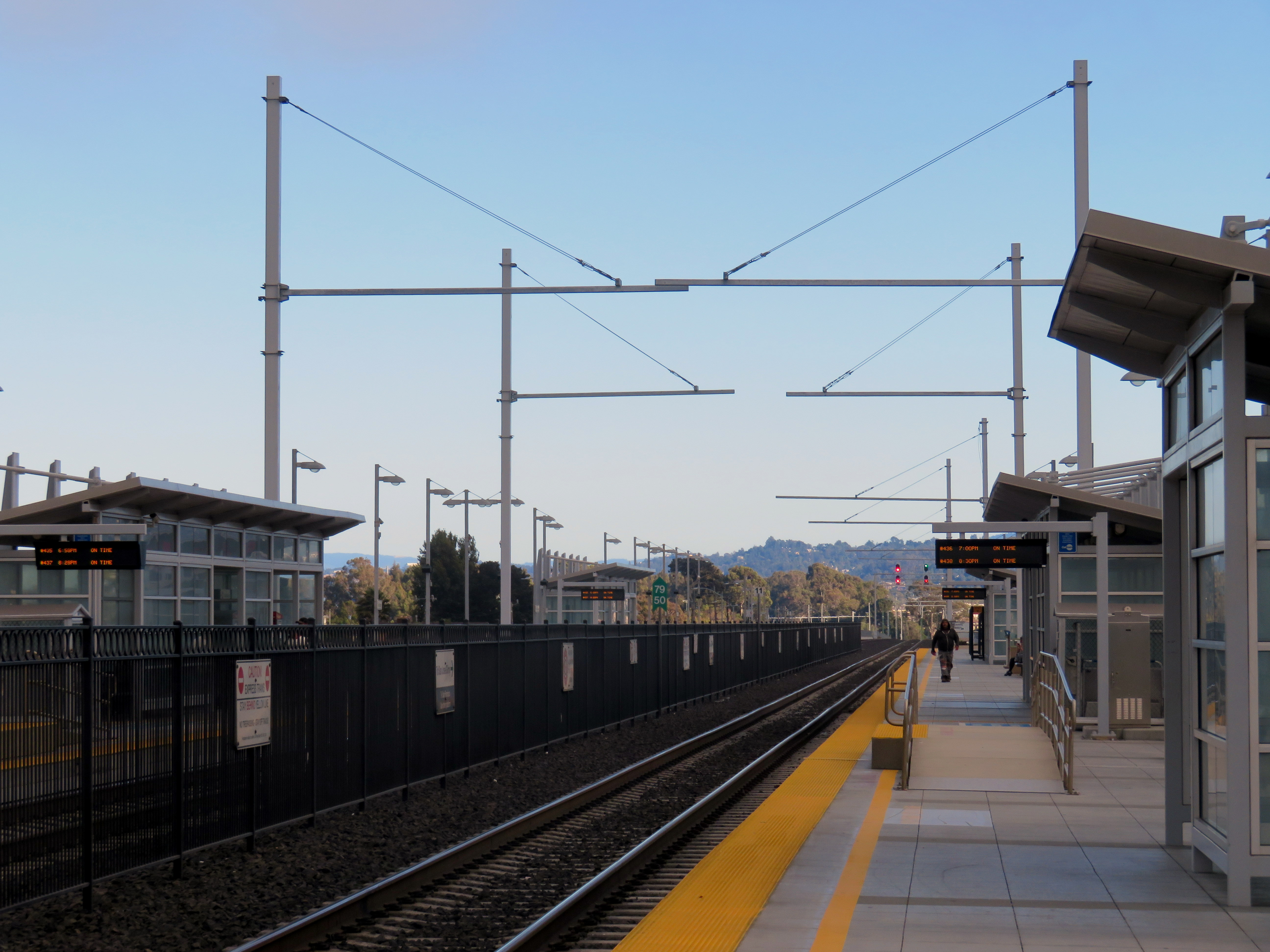
Newly installed catenary structures at San Bruno station in July 2018

A new weekday schedule designed to allow time for construction became effective on April 10, 2017. The weekend schedule was revised on July 15, 2017, which decreased frequency from 60 minutes to 90 minutes between trains and eliminated eight trains per weekend day.

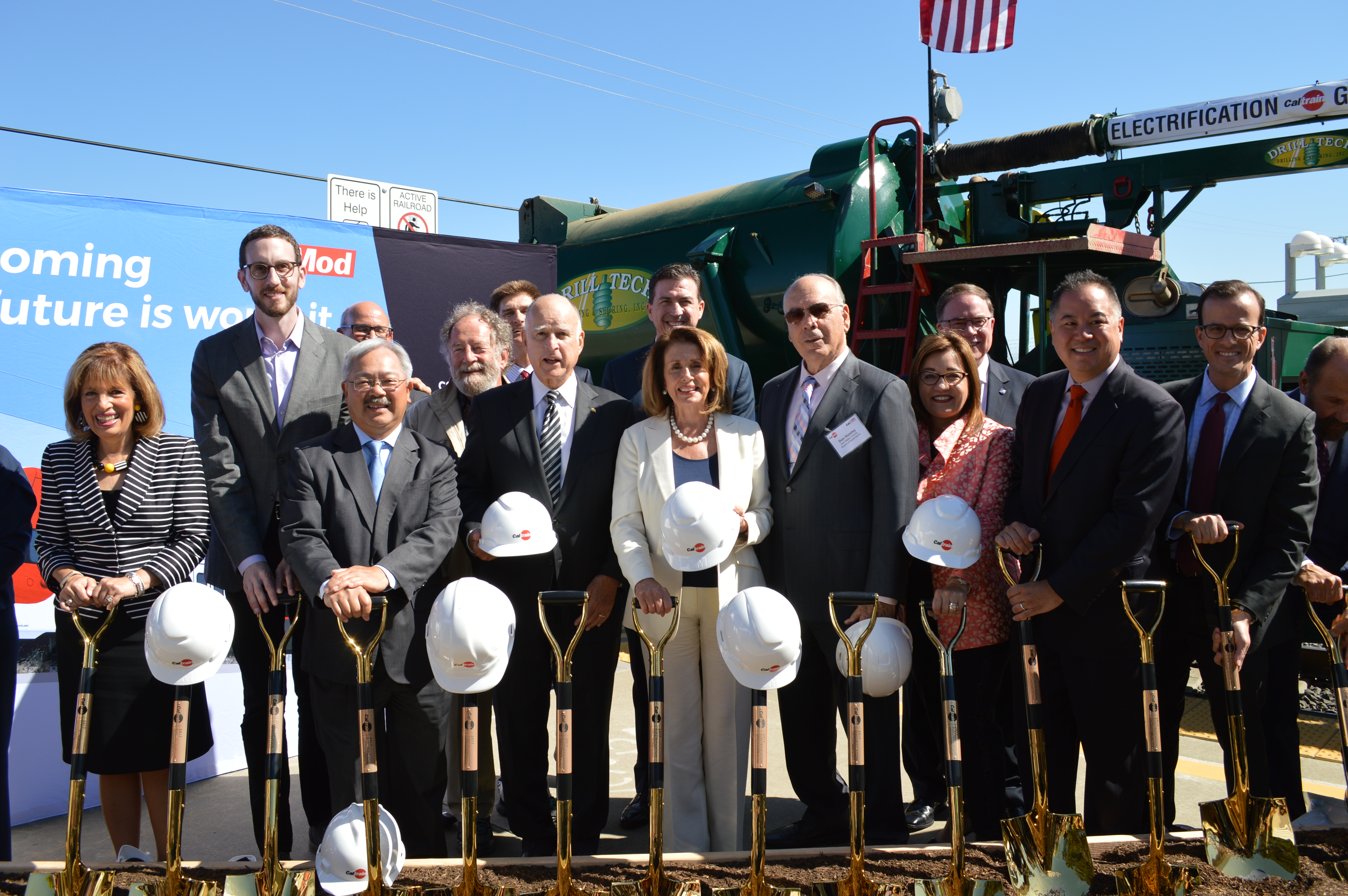
Political officials, including Rep. Jackie Speier, Cal. Sen. Scott Wiener, San Francisco Mayor Ed Lee, Gov. Jerry Brown, and Rep. Nancy Pelosi at the July 21, 2017 groundbreaking ceremony

An official groundbreaking ceremony was held on July 21, 2017, at the Millbrae station. As of June 2018, 149 poles had been erected in San Bruno and South San Francisco.

In December 2018, Caltrain was carrying 65,000 passengers a day, and expected to carry four times that amount by 2040. Accordingly, Caltrain announced plans to increase its electric train order by a third. After funding was received from the California State Transportation Agency's Transit and Intercity Rail Capital Program, Caltrain's board unanimously approved the purchase of additional cars from Stadler to increase the fleet from 16 six-car sets to 19 seven-car sets.

Balfour Beatty reported in 2019 the completion of construction could be delayed to April 2022 in a report to the San Francisco County Transportation Authority (SFCTA); the projected 12-month delay was blamed on the unexpected presence of underground utilities. In June 2021, Caltrain announced that electric service would be delayed to late 2024 due to supply chain disruptions during the COVID-19 pandemic, issues with the signal system, and "unforeseen conditions under Caltrain's tracks".

Cost and estimated completion date
Report date	Budget ($M)		Cost to Date ($M)		Revenue Service Date
Report date	Constr.	EMU	Constr.	EMU	Revenue Service Date
Jul 2016	1,318.1	662.1	64.8	13.7	Dec 30, 2021
Jan 2017	1,316.1	664.1	139.3	18.6	Dec 30, 2021
Jul 2017	1,316.1	664.1	235.0	51.4	Apr 22, 2022
Jan 2018	1,316.1	664.1	313.0	86.8	Dec 9, 2021
Jul 2018	1,316.1	664.1	383.5	119.2	Dec 9, 2021
Jan 2019	1,316.1	664.1	487.8	132.7	May 6, 2022
Jul 2019	1,316.1	664.1	584.2	149.7	May 6, 2022
Jan 2020	1,316.1	664.1	679.4	198.2	May 6, 2022
Jul 2020	1,316.1	664.1	764.5	232.3	Jul 22, 2022
Jan 2021	1,316.1	664.1	867.7	265.5	Oct 10, 2022
Jul 2021	1,316.1	664.1	986.2	303.5	Mar 31, 2024
Jan 2022	1,749.1	693.6	1,172.6	333.6	Jul 1, 2024
Jul 2022	1,749.1	693.6	1,391.5	464.8	Sep 26, 2024
Jan 2023	1,749.1	693.6	1,490.5	506.9	Sep 26, 2024
Jul 2023	1,749.1	693.6	1,600.9	524.0	Sep 26, 2024
Jan 2024	1,754.6	688.0	1,701.1	564.9	Sep 26, 2024
Sep 2024	1,754.5	688.2	1,690.7	648.3	Sep 21, 2024

In February 2022, the last foundation required for the new overhead catenary system was completed, with the entire line planned to be energised by summer 2022. Testing of the line would then begin using an AEM-7 electric locomotive, with revenue service planned for 2024. To expedite construction, the weekday train schedule was reduced and fewer stops were planned north of Hillsdale temporarily in the second half of March 2022. However, construction was suspended temporarily that month after a southbound train collided with work equipment at milepost 11.6 in San Bruno on Thursday, March 10. The train came to rest near San Felipe Avenue, and spilled fuel caused a fire, which damaged the tracks, locomotive, and passenger car. The work crew had contacted the train dispatcher at 9:50 a.m. (local) to establish exclusive occupancy on track 2 for the three hi-rail work vehicles, then released the exclusive occupancy at 9:58; the collision occurred at 10:33. According to the locomotive's event data recorder, the last recorded speed of the southbound train was 63 mph (101 km/h), but the engineer had pulled the emergency brake upon sighting the work vehicles. Fourteen people were injured in the collision and fire, but none of the injuries were life-threatening; the fire was extinguished by 11:14 a.m. The train remained on the tracks while the NTSB conducted an investigation. The reduced schedule was implemented again starting in May to accommodate construction activities in San Mateo and Burlingame.

Clearance testing of the first electric trainset on the Caltrain corridor began in July 2022. The southern Traction Power Substation was energized that August. Initial testing of the overhead catenary system and trains began along the Santa Clara Drill Track in June 2023, between the Santa Clara and College Park stations. The electrification of the line was completed in April 2024.

=== Inaugural service ===
On August 10, 2024, Caltrain concluded its tests of the Stadler KISS on the line with a non-revenue special run from 4th and King to Diridon Station and back. Caltrain Board Chair Dev Davis, Governor Gavin Newsom, Federal Railroad Administration chair Amit Bose, U.S. Senator Alex Padilla, U.S. Representatives Nancy Pelosi, Kevin Mullin and Anna Eshoo, California State Transportation Agency chief Toks Omishakin, noted transit advocates and state legislators Phil Ting and Scott Wiener, and the mayors of San Francisco and San Jose, London Breed and Matt Mahan, respectively, were among the passengers. Revenue service began the next day, and was scheduled to ramp up to its highest frequency by September 21. On that date, Caltrain held a celebration to mark the launch of the new schedule, and offered free rides throughout the day.

Trip times were shortened thanks to the faster acceleration of the new electric multiple-unit trains. A scheduled local train trip from San Jose Tamien to San Francisco 4th and King was shortened from 115 minutes with a diesel train to 83 minutes with electric service, an improvement of 32 minutes. Electric express trains improved trip times despite adding more stops - a 7-stop diesel express train from San Jose Diridon to San Francisco 4th and King was scheduled at 66 minutes, while a 10-stop electric express train went down to 59 minutes despite making more stops.

=== Environmental effects ===
Replacing the diesel locomotives with electric multiple units was expected to reduce air pollution and noise.

A UC Berkeley study conducted in 2024, before and after complete electrification of San Francisco to San Jose service, found substantial reduction in black carbon particulates, a major component of diesel exhaust. Black carbon measurements onboard trains fell by an average of 89% after electrification. The study estimated that this reduction in diesel particulate exposure would reduce excess cancer risk by 51 cases per million people among daily train commuters, and 330 cases per million people among train conductors. Ambient black carbon particulate measurements at the station platform and concourse at 4th and King station fell significantly, by as much as 1.9 micrograms per cubic meter - reductions equivalent in magnitude to what took three decades of environmental intervention to achieve in California at the end of the 20th century.

The reduced air pollution is expected to improve the health of El Palo Alto, a coastal redwood tree and historical landmark which stands about 25 feet (7.6 m) away from the Caltrain tracks and lends its name to Palo Alto. Coal soot and diesel exhaust are presumed to have killed parts of the tree's crown since the 19th century. The lack of exhaust emissions benefits air quality throughout the railway corridor, and the new units are significantly quieter than the previous stock. However, the lower noise levels have resulted in Caltrain warning the public to take extra care at crossings.

The new electric trains are more efficient than originally expected. Electricity costs were originally expected at $19.5 million per year, but were revised down to $16.5 million after several months of service, and later to $15.3 million. After $6 million in state energy credits, the first year of electric service was projected to have lower costs than the previous diesel service. Approximately 23% of the electricity consumed by trains is recaptured and returned to the grid thanks to regenerative braking. Caltrain was originally not compensated for energy returned to the grid, but successful negotiations with utilities in October 2025 resulted in an estimated $1 million per year compensation for returned energy.

== Funding ==
Under the original $1.98 billion funding plan, funding was expected to come from the California Department of Transportation, California High-Speed Rail Authority, California cap and trade revenue, Bay Area Air Quality Management District, Metropolitan Transportation Commission, the city and county of San Francisco, SamTrans, and Santa Clara Valley Transportation Authority. Approximately 33% of the planned funding, or $647 million, was expected to come from the Federal Transit Administration's Core Capacity grant, with the funding agreement approved on May 22, 2017, after a three-month delay. The plan also allocated $600 million from Proposition 1A funds that authorized the construction of high-speed rail, $113 million from cap and trade revenue, and the remainder from local and regional sources.

The delays announced in June 2021 were projected to add $333 million to the cost for a total of $2.3 billion. Of the increase, $161 million consisted of known, allocated costs with a funding plan, while $172 million was unallocated. In December 2021, Caltrain increased the budget to $2.44 billion, $462 million above the initial estimate and $129 million above the Federal Transit Administration's earlier 2021 estimate.

== Design ==
Modernizing Caltrain is a priority because we need an improved rail system that will help reduce our greenhouse gas emissions and serve our growing ridership. Not only will the electrification project reduce diesel emissions in this corridor by 96 percent by 2040, but it will also allow Caltrain to provide additional service to more stations, increasing ridership and providing faster service in Silicon Valley from San Francisco to San Jose.

— Jim Hartnett, Caltrain Executive Director

The Peninsula Corridor Electrification Project (PCEP) electrified the entire 51-mile (82 km) right-of-way owned by the Peninsula Corridor Joint Powers Board (PCJPB), which extends from the San Francisco terminus at 4th and King to a power substation south of Tamien Station. New electrical infrastructure included the installation of approximately 130 to 140 miles (210 to 230 km) of 25 kV 60 Hz single-phase AC overhead contact lines and ten new power stations (two traction power stations, a switching station approximately halfway along the line, and seven paralleling stations). Land totaling 290,000 ft^{2} (6.7 acres; 2.7 ha) was acquired from private property owners along the Peninsula Corridor in order to set up safety buffer zones between the overhead contact system and public property; PCJPB authorized eminent domain proceedings in July 2017 in case negotiations broke down. Barriers were installed where road and pedestrian bridges cross over tracks to prevent damage to the electrical wires. New electric trainsets were purchased for use on the electrified segment, while service south of Tamien to Gilroy remains diesel-operated because the tracks are owned by Union Pacific Railroad.

The second part of the CalMod project was a positive train control system, initially developed as "CBOSS" (Communications Based Overlay Signal System), which was designed to meet federal safety requirements and conditions set by the FRA to allow mixed traffic on the corridor. Key decisions in the development of CalMod can be traced back to the 1992 Feasibility Study, which recommended 25 kV AC overhead lines; the 1998 Rapid Rail Study, which recommended low-cost upgrades to first improve service and build demand; the 2006 Project 2025 proposal, which proposed the use of lightweight electric multiple units; the 2009 FRA waiver, which imposed certain conditions on mixed traffic; and the 2012 memorandum of understanding with CHSRA, which resulted in a "blended" system to use the existing twin-track line as much as possible. The 2012 Blended Operations report concluded a new 8-mile (13 km) quad-track overtake section would allow Caltrain and CHSRA to coexist on the Peninsula Corridor with up to ten trains per peak hour: six Caltrain and four high-speed rail trains. Peak load on the system assuming twelve eight-EMU consists in each direction per hour was estimated to be approximately 75 MW, with the load generally remaining under 40-50 MW at any point.

According to Caltrain, the electrification project was expected to bring multiple benefits to the corridor. Firstly, electric trains can accelerate and decelerate more quickly than the older diesel locomotives, resulting in faster and more frequent service. They were also expected to replace Caltrain's diesel locomotives and passenger cars, a significant portion of which were nearing the end of their lives. Additionally, electric trainsets are quieter and produce less air pollution than diesel locomotives, and the use of electric trains was expected to lower Caltrain's fuel costs while increasing passenger revenue through higher ridership. Caltrain projected that electrification would reduce annual carbon dioxide emissions by 176,000 metric tons and increase daily ridership by 21% by 2040. Restoring daily service to Atherton and Broadway stations was considered, although with the permanent closure of Atherton station, only Broadway station was expected to receive restored daily service. However, Broadway remained a weekend-only station as of November 2026. Under the original schedule, Caltrain planned to complete the project by the end of 2021. The electrification project instead reached substantial completion on May 3, 2024, and full electrified service began on September 21, 2024.

=== Electrical station configuration ===
Proposed electrical station locations for PCEP
(closest train stop and milepost distance from San Francisco)
- Paralleling Station
- Traction Power Substation
- Switching Station
1 PS1 (San Francisco/22nd Street, milepost 1.3)
2 PS2 (Bayshore, MP 5.0)
3 TPS1 (South San Francisco, MP 9.2)
4 PS3 (Broadway, MP 15.0)
5 PS4 (Hillsdale, MP 20.4)
6 SWS1 (Redwood City/Atherton, MP 26.7 [option 1] or MP 26.2 [option 2])
7 PS5 (San Antonio, MP 32.0)
8 PS6 (Sunnyvale, MP 38.7)
9 TPS2 (College Park, MP 46.0)
10 PS7 (Tamien, MP 49.7 [Variant C] or MP 49.8 [Variant D])

Power is supplied to the trains through an overhead contact system (OCS), consisting of a messenger wire, which assumes a catenary shape due to sag, and a contact wire suspended below the messenger wire. The contact wire is nearly parallel to the ground, and supplies traction current to the pantograph(s) of an electric train. Both the messenger wire and the contact wire are energized with single-phase alternating current at 25 kV with a frequency of 60 Hz. This allows the OCS to be used for both Caltrain and future California High-speed Rail service, and this electrical configuration matches that of Amtrak on portions of the Northeast Corridor and portions of the New Jersey Transit commuter rail system.

The 2×25 kV autotransformer electrification system includes a third energized parallel negative feeder wire which helps control electromagnetic field propagation. The feeder wire is electrified at the same voltage and frequency, but is shifted 180° out of phase so the voltage difference between the contact wire and the feeder wire is always 50kV. The choice of a 2×25 kV autotransformer system means more traction power facilities are required in total, but also requires fewer traction power substations.

Contact wire heights vary between 16 and 23 feet (4.9 and 7.0 m), depending on overhead clearance required, with the messenger wire another 2 to 5 feet (0.61 to 1.52 m) above that, and pole heights vary between 30 and 50 feet (9.1 and 15.2 m). Nominal clearance under the contact wire is 23 feet (7.0 m) to accommodate freight and non-electrified passenger rail service. Poles are nominally spaced 180 to 200 feet (55 to 61 m) apart, but can be reduced to 75 feet (23 m) for the tightest-radius bends (at Sierra Point in Brisbane, and just north of San Jose). Typical pole spacing in bends is 120 to 150 feet (37 to 46 m), and for straight sections of track, maximum spacing is 230 feet (70 m) between poles.

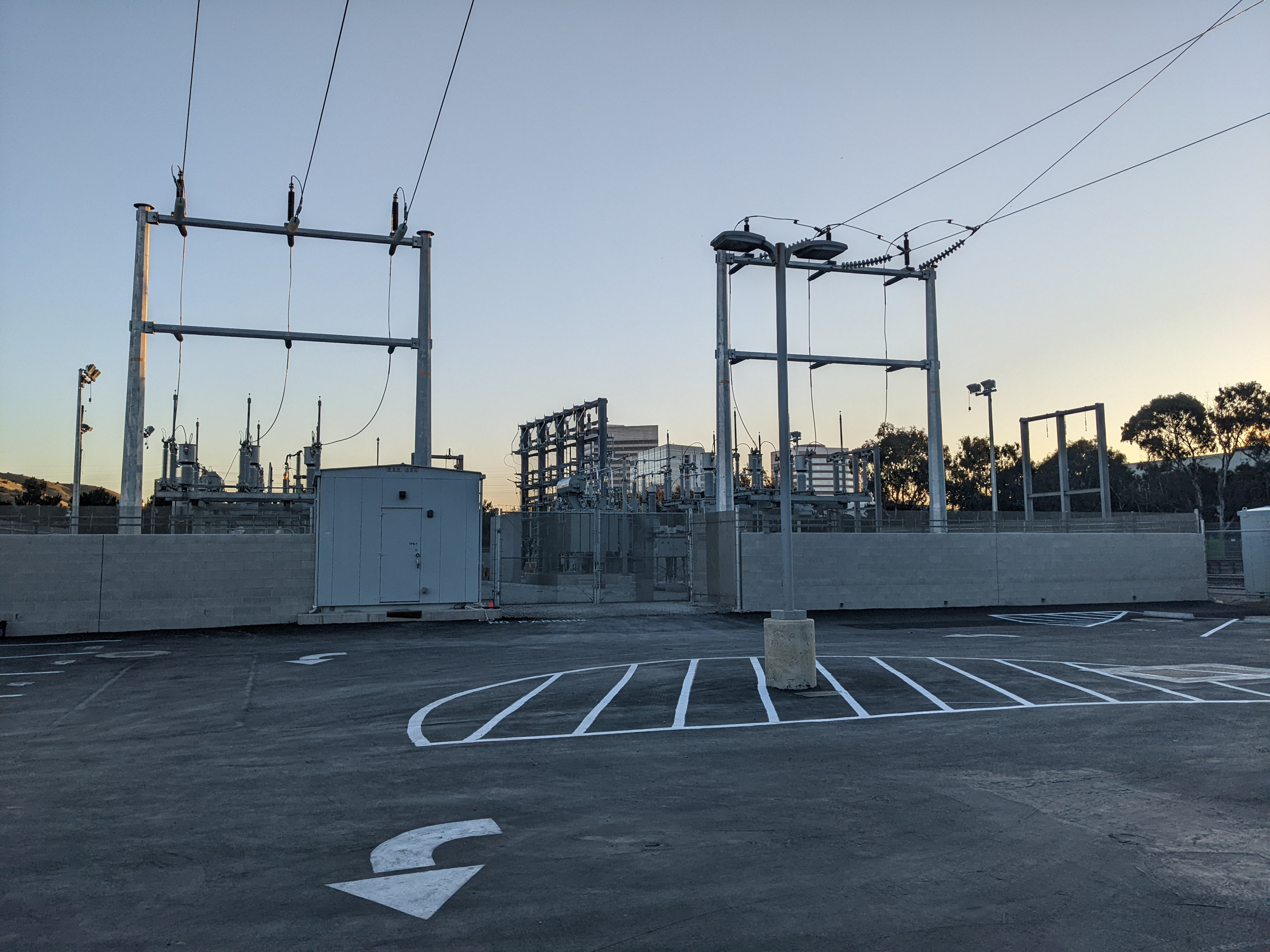
Traction Power Substation 1, South San Francisco (2022)

A total of ten electrical stations were built: two traction power substations, one switching station, and seven paralleling stations. Each traction power substation (TPS) has a footprint of 150 by 200 feet (46 by 61 m) and contains two 60 MVA transformers to step down supply power (at 115 kV AC) to the 2×25 kV AC required for the messenger/contact and feeder lines. The switching station (SWS) is located near the Redwood Junction, approximately halfway between the two traction power substations. The SWS includes a phase break to electrically isolate the power supplied from each TPS and two 10 MVA autotransformers, in a footprint of 80 by 160 feet (24 by 49 m). The paralleling stations (PS) each maintain system voltage with one or two 10 MVA autotransformers and have a footprint of 40 by 80 feet (12 by 24 m).

PS3 in Burlingame was originally approved via the FEIR for a location near the intersection of California and Lincoln; however, this would interfere with plans to grade separate the crossing at Broadway, so PS3 was moved west of the tracks to a location near Mills and California. Based on resident objections to the new site, however, the City of Burlingame offered an alternative site east of the tracks at 1369 North Carolan adjacent to the city-owned Corporation Yard.

=== Construction plans ===
The PCJPB-owned right-of-way was divided into four construction segments. From the north, the segments were arranged as:

1. 4th and King, 22nd Street, Bayshore
2. (South San Francisco, San Bruno); (Millbrae, Broadway, Burlingame); (San Mateo, Hayward Park, Hillsdale); (Belmont, San Carlos); (Redwood City, Atherton)
3. Menlo Park, Palo Alto, Stanford, California Avenue, San Antonio, Mountain View, Sunnyvale, Lawrence
4. (Santa Clara, College Park, San Jose, Tamien)

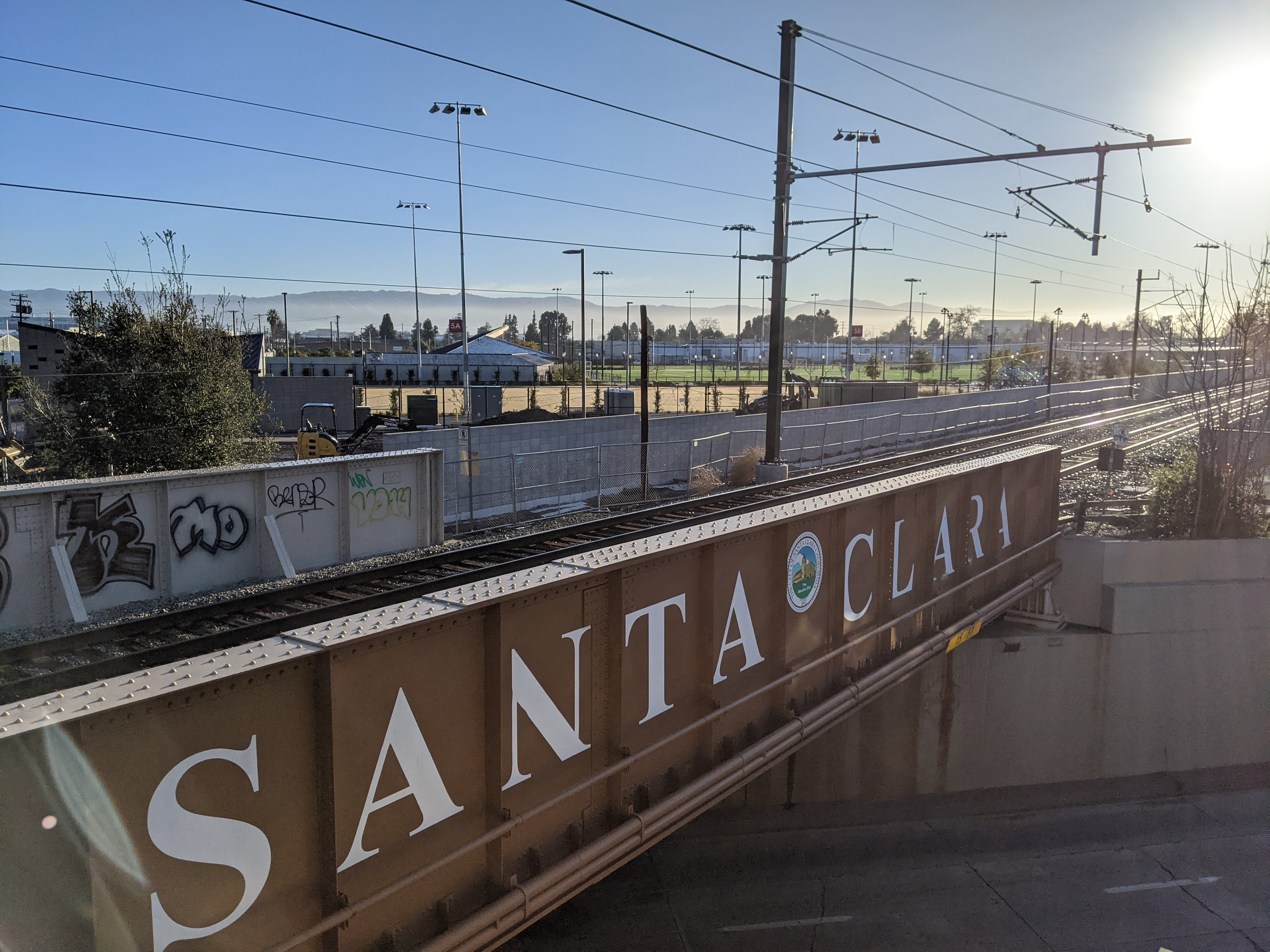
Single-pole structure (supporting wires for both northbound and southbound tracks) in Santa Clara at the Lafayette Avenue overpass (2021); the catenary wire for the northbound tracks are in place.

Segments were further divided into work areas, indicated by brackets in the list above. Work began in Segments 2 and 4 and proceeded from north to south within each segment before moving on to Segments 1 and 3. The first work area was in the cities of South San Francisco and San Bruno. Within each work area, the first two months of activity involved tree pruning and removal, followed by three to five months of construction of the foundations for the overhead contact system poles. Once completed, construction of the electrical station(s) (if present) and pole and wire installation work in parallel and take about a year. By January 2022, all foundations were complete. Pole and wiring work in Segments 3 and 4 was also complete, with work remaining in Segments 1 and 2.

In Atherton, 18 trees were planned to be removed with an additional 63 trees pruned more than 25%. 83 trees would be replaced as a result, per the Atherton Tree Replacement Plan. Atherton residents objected to the plans in November 2017, stating the five planned double-cantilever side poles (spanning both tracks from one side) were taller than expected, and asked PCJPB to redesign the OCS support to use ten shorter single-cantilever side poles (spanning one track each). In their response, PCJPB stated it would cost an additional $200,000 to redesign and would require more extensive tree removal; a later response asked that Atherton pay the difference and indemnify Caltrain from further lawsuits related to PCEP, which Atherton rejected.

During some station construction work, passengers boarded northbound and southbound trains from the same platform. Posted signs indicated which platform to use.

Segment 4 was powered on in summer 2022, following testing of the new traction power facilities.

=== Specific modifications ===
The Santa Clara Drill track, an existing maintenance track approximately 1.5 miles (2.4 km) long from CEMOF to Santa Clara station, was converted to an electrified test track. Testing was anticipated to take place during the daytime between late 2019 and spring 2022. The rehabilitation of Santa Clara Drill track began in February 2018. In April 2019, the anticipated completion date for the test track was in May 2020, with testing scheduled to start in late 2021. By January 2024, three trains had successfully completed over 1,000 miles (1,600 km) of test runs, and six trains had been delivered.

The four tunnels originally constructed for the Bayshore Cutoff were modified to accommodate overhead wires. The tunnel lining was notched at the crown to allow clearance under the wire for freight trains, which mainly removes shotcrete placed in 2004, but some of the historical brick lining was removed as part of the tunnel modification work. In addition, up to 21 inches (530 mm) of the decorative stone portal was removed. In the FEIR, PCJPB noted they may exercise the option to lower tracks to minimize tunnel notching. The tunnel notching work was performed during weekends, so service between Bayshore and 4th and King was replaced by buses starting on October 6, 2018, with a planned "late Spring 2019" resumption.

CEMOF was modified to accommodate the new EMUs. An existing inspection pit was extended by 330 feet (100 m), allowing work over the entire length of a seven-car EMU train. In addition, a rolling maintenance platform was added to the building to allow work on the top of the train cars, and a permanent tent was erected for parts storage.

=== FRA waiver and I-ETMS PTC ===
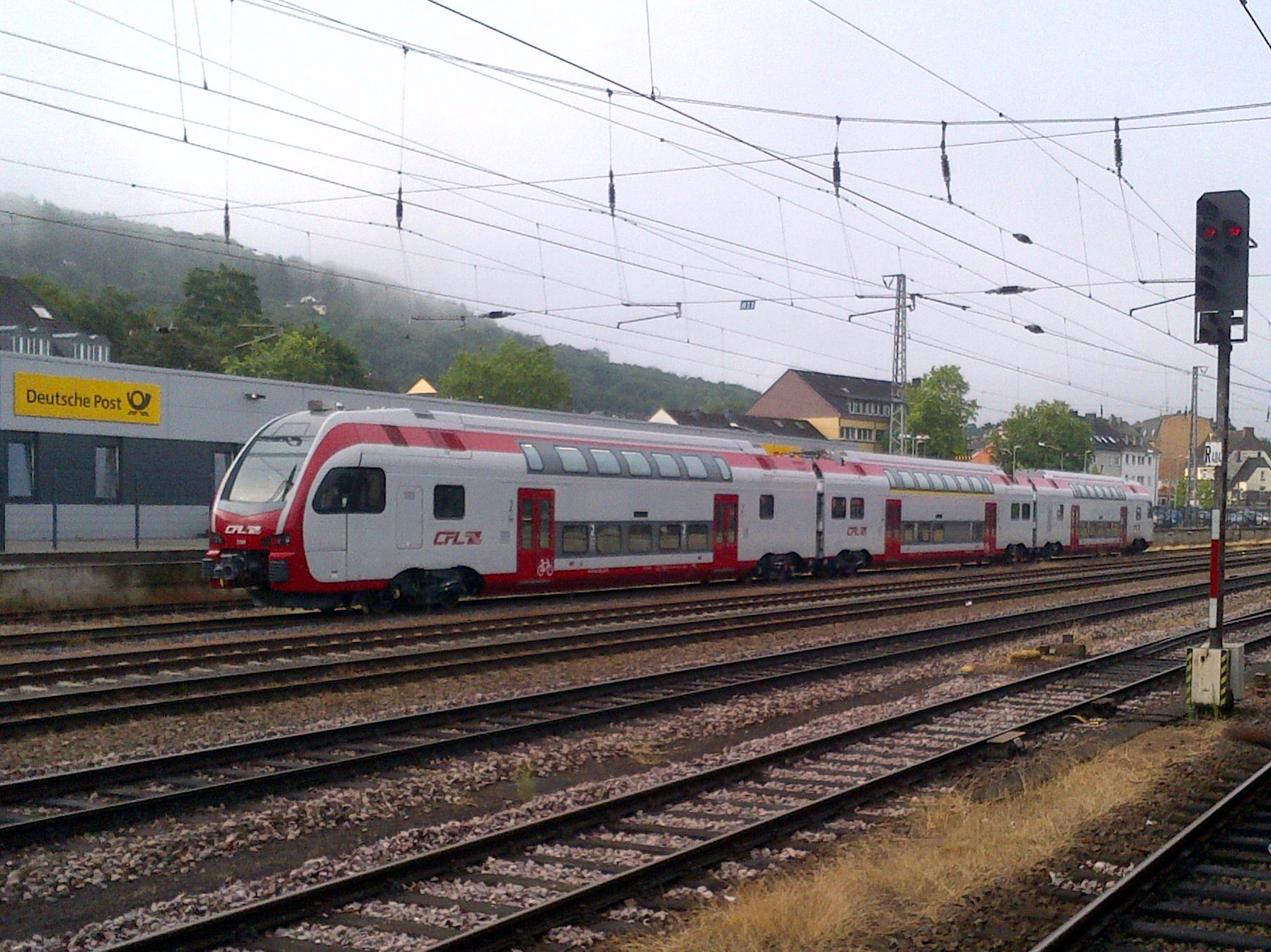
Under U.S. federal regulations, light-weight trainsets such as this Stadler KISS belonging to Luxembourg's CFL are not allowed to share rail lines with heavy freight trains.

As a result of the blended plan, PCJPB mandated that Peninsula Corridor infrastructure and equipment should be compatible with future California High-Speed Rail Authority (CHSRA) trains. CHSRA had proposed that mandated speeds and transit times could be met by using lighter-weight vehicles that did not comply with Federal requirements. These required physical separation between FRA "compliant" and "non-compliant" rail vehicles and structural strength. Caltrain saw this as an opportunity to apply for an FRA waiver to run lighter-weight EMUs, which could accelerate faster and provide headways as low as five minutes. The December 2009 FRA waiver application detailed Caltrain's plans to prevent collisions: first, reduce the probability of collisions to nearly zero by employing temporal and spatial separation from freight rail and restricting freight traffic to the non-revenue hours, then mitigate the impact of a collision by deploying vehicles with crash energy management (CEM) structures, and then deployment of an enhanced positive train control system, designed to check for speeding trains and protect rail workers.

Positive train control became a Federal mandate with the passing of the Rail Safety Improvement Act of 2008. After review, the FRA waiver was granted in May 2010, marking the first time lighter-weight EMUs were allowed to share rails with freight in the United States. The grant was conditioned on meeting nine additional requirements, including demonstrating minimum crashworthiness, seating, improving grade crossing, meeting FRA positive train control standards in Title 49 of the Code of Federal Regulations, part 236 with CBOSS, formalizing the temporal separation plan, and issuing a safety system program.

Originally, Caltrain employed Parsons Transportation to develop a custom PTC system, called CBOSS, for CalMod, but due to delays, Caltrain switched to Wabtec and their I-ETMS system. Caltrain announced the Federal Railroad Administration had certified its PTC implementation in December 2020.

=== Rolling stock ===
Electric rolling stock compared with existing diesel & electric locomotives
Type	Diesel locomotive		Electric locomotive		Electric multiple unit	
	EMD F40PH-2	MPI MP36PH-3C	EMD AEM-7	Siemens ACS-64 (Note: As configured for Amtrak Northeast Corridor service)	Stadler KISS EMU single car	Stadler KISS EMU 7-car set
Length	56 ft 2 in (17.12 m)	68 ft (21 m)	53 ft (16 m)	66.7 ft (20.32 m)	85 ft 10.5 in (26.175 m) (Note: Average assumed from dividing values for six-EMU consist by 6. Leading and trailing cab cars are different than trailer cars due to crash energy management structures and traction equipment. Some trailer cars do not have traction motors.)	598 ft 11 in (182.55 m)
Weight	260,000 lb (120,000 kg)	265,000 lb (120,000 kg)	200,000 lb (91,000 kg)	215,537 lb (97,766 kg)	TBC (Note: Only five of seven cars in the consist are powered, according to the Stadler brochure: two cab cars (leading and trailing cars with operator cabins, each with one powered truck) and three passenger trailers (each with two powered trucks); the two bike trailers per train have electrical conversion equipment but both trucks do not have traction motors. Weight and power per car will differ from car to car. Tractive effort is not meaningful for a single car.)	946,000 lb (429,000 kg)
Power	3,000 hp (2,200 kW)	3,600 hp (2,700 kW)	6,700 hp (5,000 kW)	6,700 hp (5,000 kW) (Note: Continuous rated power. Maximum power is 8,600 hp (6,400 kW).)	0–2,000 hp (0–1,491 kW)	9,400 hp (7,000 kW) (Note: Continuous rated power.) (Note: Rating is upgraded for 7-EMU train, the diagram indicates there are eight powered trucks in the 7-EMU consist, compared to six powered trucks in the 6-EMU consist.)
Starting tractive effort	65,000 lbf (290,000 N)	85,000 lbf (380,000 N)	51,700 lbf (230,000 N)	72,000 lbf (320,000 N)	N/A	145,190 lbf (645,850 N)
References						

==== Stadler EMU ====
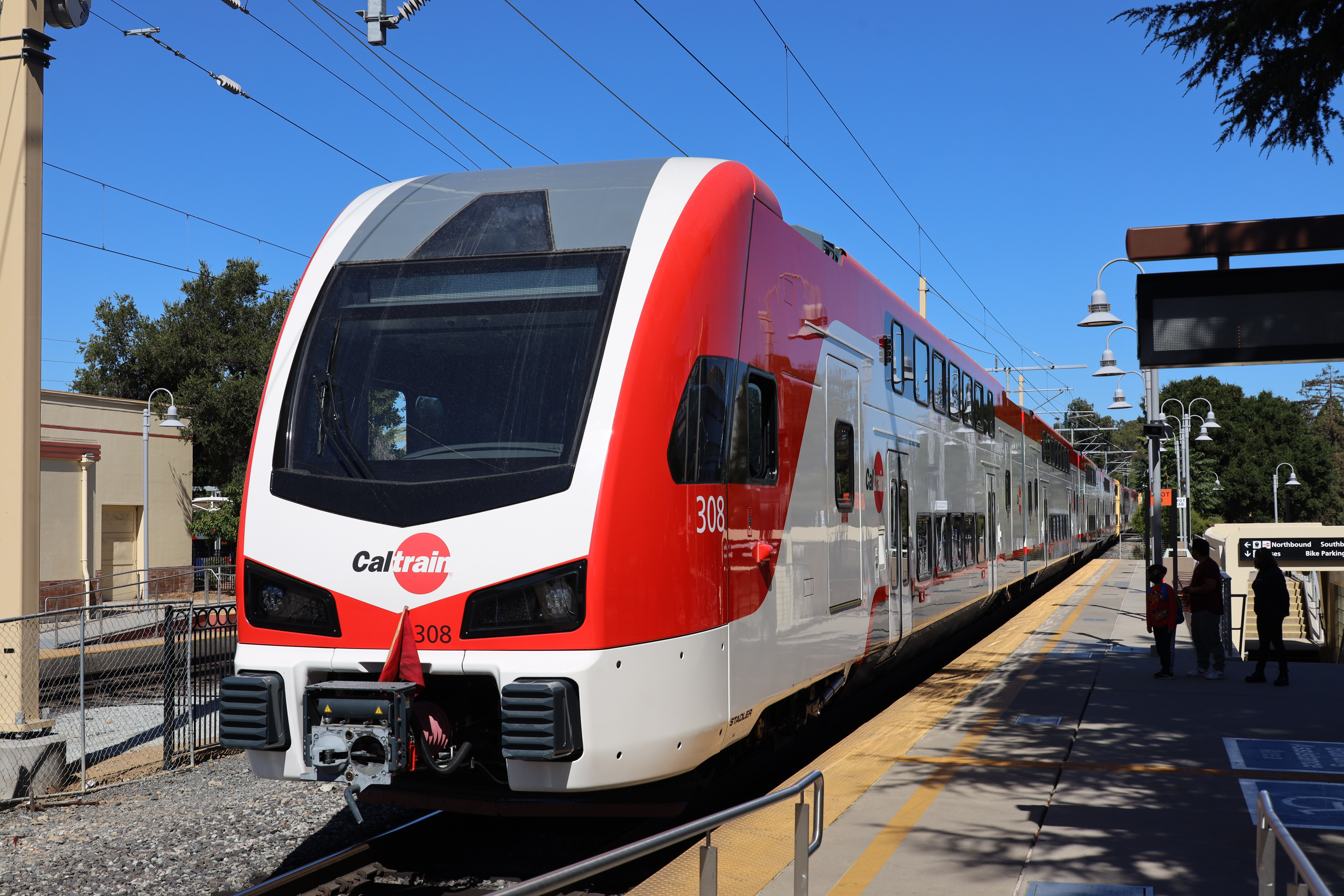
A Caltrain Stadler KISS undergoing testing at Palo Alto station.

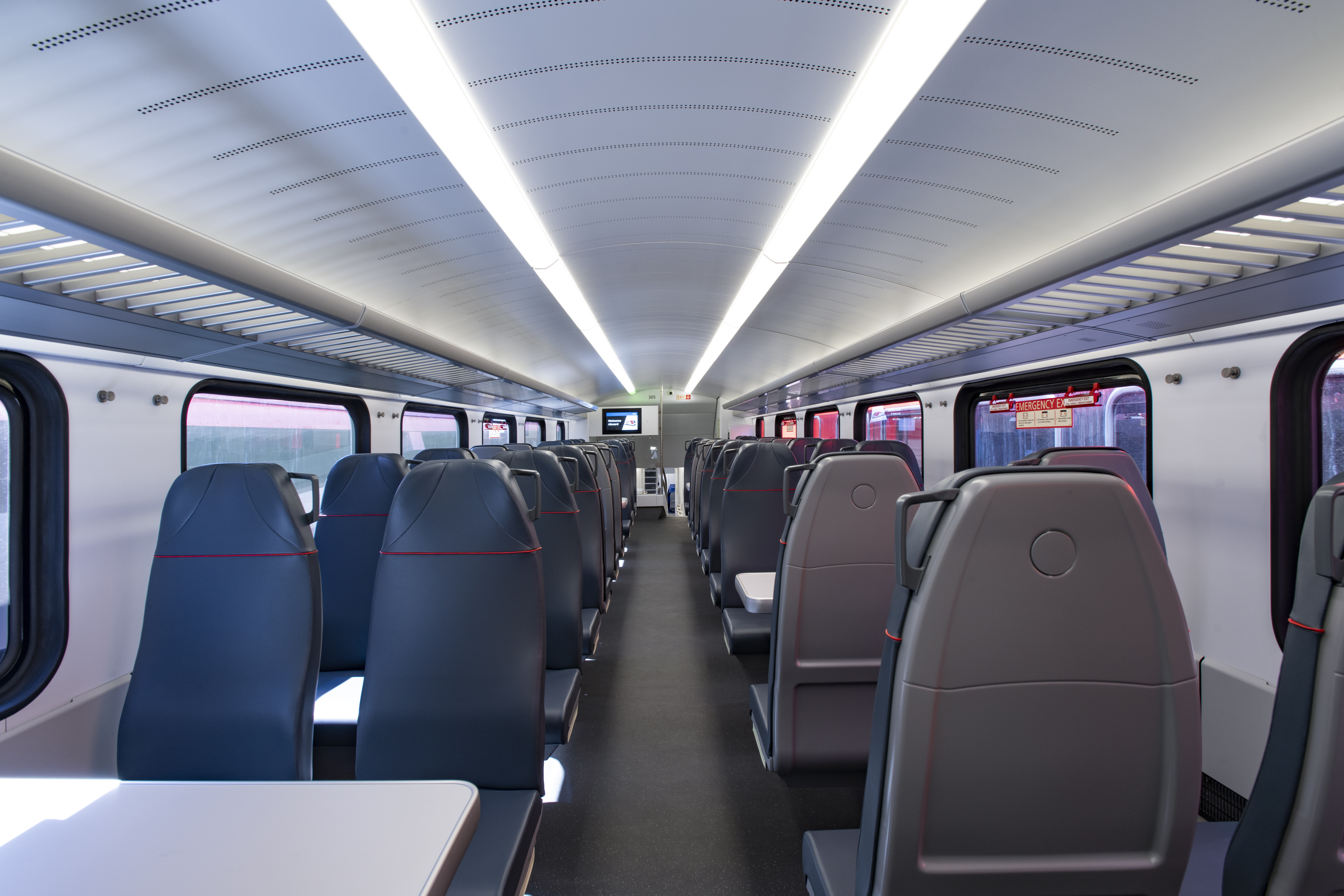
The interior of the upper deck of a Caltrain Stadler KISS.

The Stadler KISS double-decker EMUs that Caltrain ordered are compliant with the FRA alternative Tier-I crash-worthiness standard. Under the alternative standard, they have Crash Energy Management (CEM) features which allow parts of the EMU to collapse whilst keeping the passenger seating area intact in the event of collision, instead of relying on pure structural strength as in the traditional Tier-I standard. The implementation of the alternative Tier-I standard results in a lighter train designed to reduce energy and track maintenance costs. Coupled with the positive train control system installed on the Caltrain line, Caltrain KISS trains are allowed to operate in mixed traffic with heavier trains, such as Amtrak passenger trains and Union Pacific freight trains, instead of the temporal separation required in the 2009 waiver.

Because the existing Caltrain platforms are at a different height compared to proposed high-speed rail vehicles, the EMU trains are equipped with doors at two heights, at 22-inch (560 mm) and 50.5-inch (1,280 mm) above-top-of-rail, allowing Caltrain to eventually transition from the existing 8-inch (200 mm) low platforms to CHSRA-compatible high platforms, enabling unassisted boarding of all passengers as specified by the Americans with Disabilities Act of 1990.

Stadler/Caltrain KISS capacity
		B	C	D	G	E	F	A	Total
Fixed Seats	Upstairs	52	52	60	52	52	60	52	380
Fixed Seats	Downstairs	32	17	16	32	32	16	32	177
Folding Seats	Downstairs	18	16	13	16	16	13	18	110
Wheelchairs		2	2	2	2	2	2	2	14
Bikes				36			36		72
Bathroom			1						1

In January 2018, PCJPB applied for $631.5 million in state funds for the Electrification Expansion Project (EEP), part of which would be used to exercise the option to purchase an additional 96 EMUs at a cost of $600M. The existing funding for PCEP includes the purchase of 96 EMUs, which would displace 75% of the current diesel-hauled passenger trains from the Peninsula Corridor. The additional funds requested for EEP would bring the electric fleet to 192 EMUs, enabling Caltrain to displace all diesel passenger locomotives between San Francisco and Tamien with a fleet of 24 8-EMU consists. $11.5M of the request would be used for station improvements: $8M to expand certain platforms to accommodate 8-EMU trains and $3.5M to increase secure bicycle storage. An additional $14M would be used to implement on-board WiFi for passengers. The remaining $6M would be used to support planning and policies along the Peninsula Corridor. The updated EMU consist configuration, according to Stadler brochures released in 2021 and 2023, adds a seventh car, which is a passenger trailer with two powered trucks, giving the EMU a total of eight powered trucks.

Stadler EMU progress
Date	Shells Shipped	In SLC	At CEMOF
Jul 2018	2	0	0
Jan 2019	12	8	0
Jul 2019	21	19	0
Jan 2020	28	25	0
Jul 2020	43	34	0
Jan 2021	66	49	0
Jul 2021	82	73	0
Jan 2022	93	89	0
Jul 2022	?	?	14

The first two shells, destined for cab cars, were shipped from Altenrhein to Salt Lake City on June 5, 2018. At the time, Stadler's new Salt Lake City final assembly plant was still under construction, but a portion was ready by the time the first shell arrived in August 2018. Stadler announced the first car bodies arrived on September 5, 2018, and were rolled directly into the new Salt Lake facility. As of January 2019, an option had been exercised to expand the order to 133 cars using Transit and Intercity Rail Capital Program funding, to be delivered as 19 trainsets, each consisting of 7 railcars. By April 2019, Stadler had completed and shipped 15 shells, with 10 received and being finished at Salt Lake City. Stadler moved into its new building on May 15, 2019; at the ceremony, attended by Governor Gary Herbert and Stadler CEO Peter Spuhler, one of the KISS EMUs for Caltrain was displayed alongside the final FLIRT diesel multiple unit for TEXRail, named "Spike". The press conference also was staged to re-enact and honor the 150th anniversary of the completion of the First transcontinental railroad.

The first seven-car trainset was moved to Stadler's onsite test track in Salt Lake City for static testing in May 2020; it was completed in July 2020 and began low-speed initial type testing in November 2020. It was shipped to the Transportation Technology Center in Pueblo, Colorado for dynamic type testing in February 2021, and arrived in March 2021. At the same time, one car was sent to Elmira, New York for environmental testing. New trains were scheduled to be delivered through 2024; the first tests of the new electric trainsets in California were scheduled for Spring 2022.

In late March 2022, Caltrain received its first Stadler EMU trainsets at CEMOF. Two trainsets were displayed at the 4th and King station during a ceremony attended by politicians on September 24, 2022. In August 2023, Caltrain exercised an option to order four additional seven-car EMU trainsets ($220 million) and a single four-car battery electric multiple unit (BEMU) trainset ($80 million). This will result in a fleet of 23 EMU trainsets, six diesel-hauled trainsets, and one BEMU trainset by 2030, with over 90% of service using electric trains. The BEMU trainset will be used on the non-electrified portion of the corridor between San Jose and Gilroy.

==== EMD AEM-7AC ====
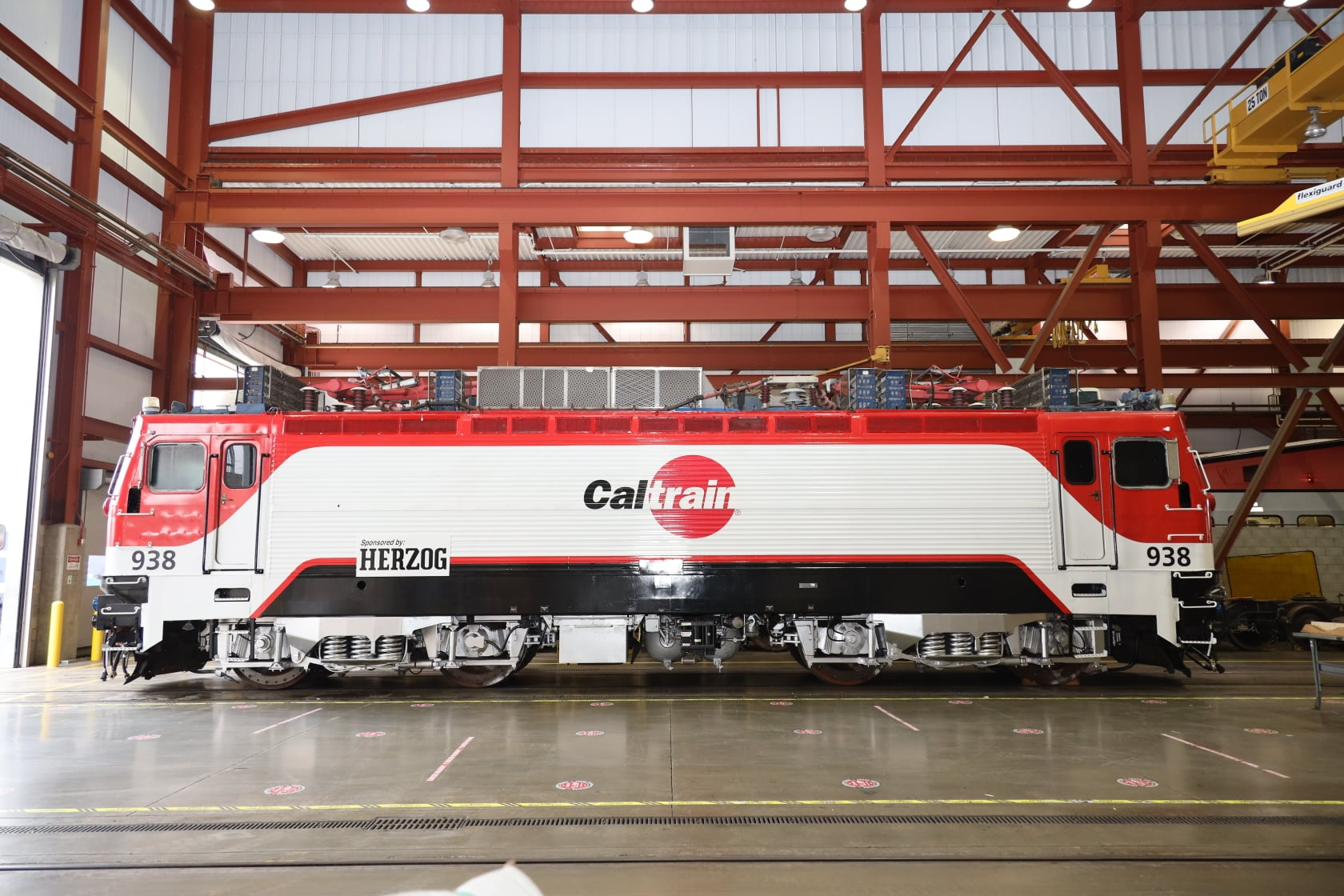
One locomotive in Caltrain livery, December 2021

Since Amtrak has replaced its fleet of EMD AEM-7 locomotives with Siemens ACS-64, PCJPB entered discussions to purchase retired AEM-7s to test the electrification system and to serve as reserve locomotives in the event of EMU unavailability. Because of the delay in delivering ACS-64s, the target sale date for the AEM-7s was moved out to June 2016. Although procuring an ACS-64 for testing was considered, Siemens stated no locomotives were available for lease, and the cost to purchase a new ACS-64 exceeded the budget allowance for testing.

The May 2017 PCEP Monthly Progress Report noted that PCJPB was drafting two requests for proposals: one to purchase an electric locomotive to test the electrification system, and another to refurbish an electric locomotive. By October 2017, the work in progress had identified two vendors: Mitsui for purchase, and Amtrak for refurbishment; in January 2018, contracts were ready to be awarded to those vendors. Mitsui owns several ex-Amtrak AEM-7 locomotives. On June 7, 2018, Caltrain staff recommended that two contracts be awarded for a total of approximately $610,000: one to purchase two AEM-7ACs from Mitsui & Co, and the other to Amtrak for refurbishment, training, and transportation to the Caltrain Centralized Equipment Maintenance and Operations Facility (CEMOF), which passed unanimously. The AEM-7AC locomotives were scheduled to arrive in February 2019, but were still at Amtrak's Ivy City facility (near Washington D.C.) in April 2019 and did not arrive in California until June 28. They were moved to CEMOF in early August and by September, were being stored at the San Francisco Rail Yard. The used locomotives were to be disposed of after testing.
