= Caltrain Centralized Equipment Maintenance and Operations Facility =

Train maintenance yard in California

Centralized Equipment Maintenance and Operations Facility
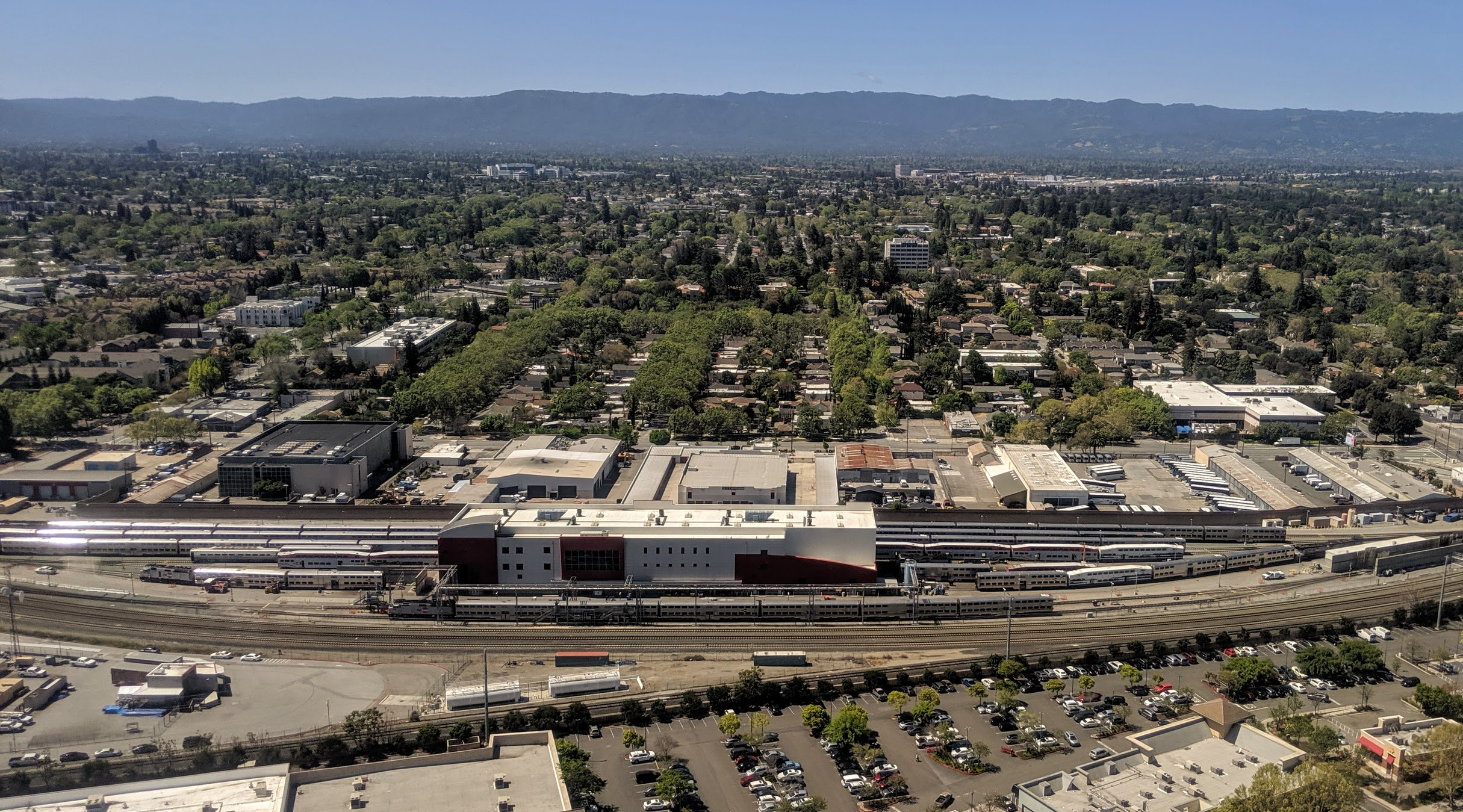
- Aerial view of the Caltrain Centralized Equipment Maintenance and Operations Facility.

- Location within San Jose, California
- Alternative names: CEMOF

General information
- Status: Operational
- Location: 585 Lenzen Avenue, San Jose, United States
- Coordinates: 37°20′22″N 121°54′35″W
- Groundbreaking: October 2004
- Construction started: July 2005
- Completed: September 2007
- Opened: October 13, 2007
- Cost: 2004: US$140,000,000 (equivalent to $238,636,364 in 2025)
- Owner: Peninsula Corridor Joint Powers Board

The Caltrain Centralized Equipment Maintenance and Operations Facility (CEMOF) is a train maintenance yard and facility located to the north of San Jose Diridon Station in Central San Jose, California. The $140 million maintenance station began construction in 2004 and opened in 2007, consolidating much of Caltrain's maintenance and operations into one location.

== History ==
Planning for CEMOF started in the late 1980s under Caltrans; up to that point, light maintenance was being performed at yards in San Francisco and San Jose, and heavier maintenance required transporting equipment to Roseville, a trip that took two days each way. The only maintenance pit was in San Jose, just a single car length long. All locomotive maintenance was performed in Oakland, and wheels were resurfaced at an Amtrak shop in Wilmington, Delaware. Consolidating operations into a single facility was estimated to reduce annual costs by $425,000 to $530,000 for transportation.

Work on the US$140 million project began in October 2004, with US$105.8 million coming from federal funding and US$8.2 million from state funding. The construction phase of the facility lasted approximately three years; preliminary work completed in 2005 included relocation of existing rail lines and utilities, a 1,800-foot-long (550 m) wall to attenuate construction noise, and a tunnel to link the maintenance facilities with the east yard. Work on the new buildings and facilities began in summer 2005. On September 29, 2007, Caltrain held a grand opening ceremony. The first shift of maintenance and operations crew did not move into the new shop until October 21, followed by the second and third shifts in November. The last component of this yard, the fueling storage and station, was completed in Spring 2008.

To accommodate maintenance requirements for the new Stadler KISS electric multiple units (EMUs) being procured as part of the Caltrain Modernization Program, CEMOF was modified starting in 2019. Modifications included the extension of the existing Service and Inspection Pit, allowing the underside of a seven-car EMU train to be inspected without repositioning; adding moveable platforms inside the shop for inspection and maintenance of roof-mounted equipment; adding pantograph inspection cameras to inspect each car at least once a day; and building a temporary storage facility for EMU parts while the current warehouse is occupied by parts for the diesel-based fleet.

== Description ==
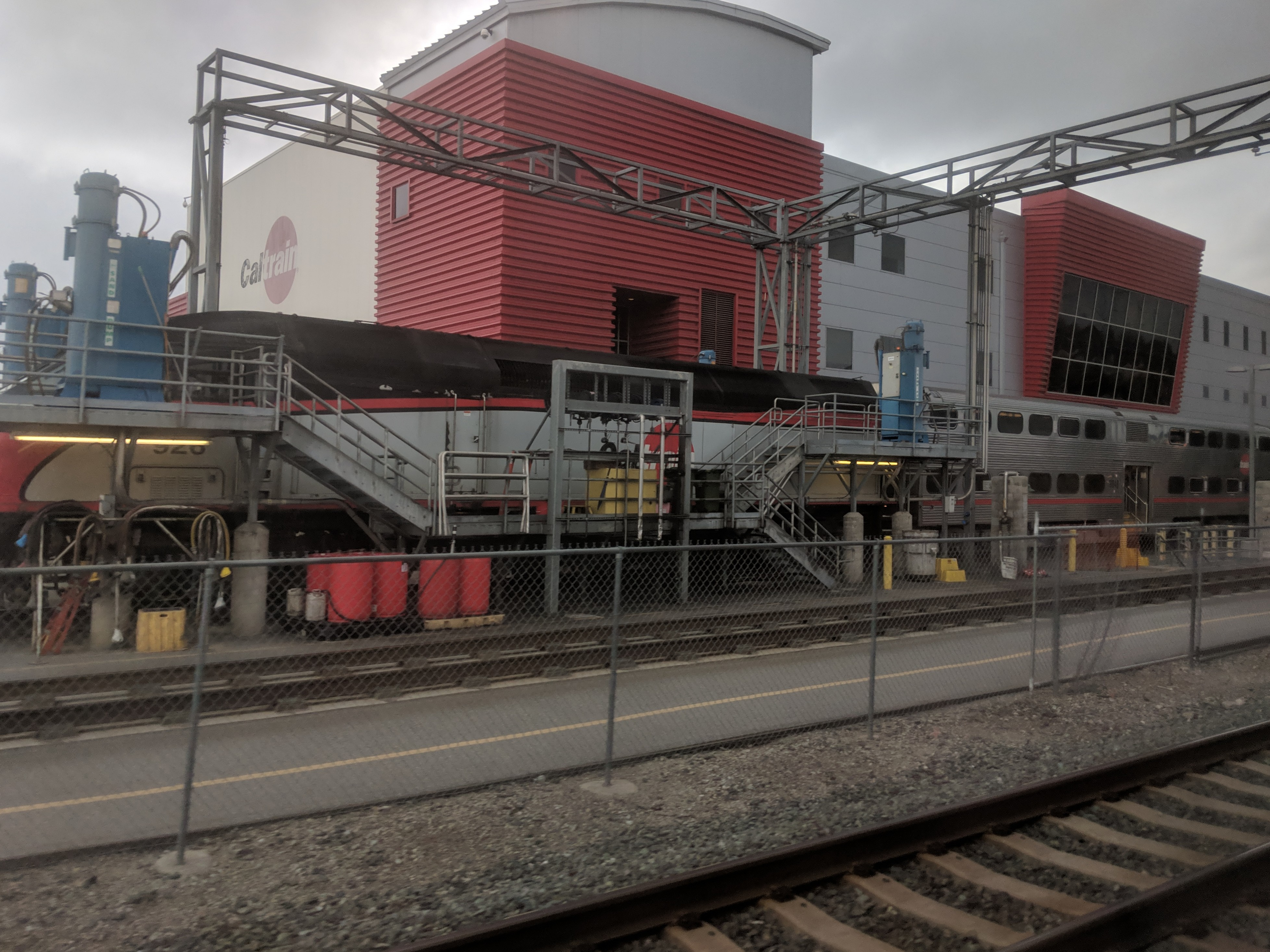
Train with MPI MP36PH-3C locomotive and Nippon Sharyo gallery cars at the Service & Inspection Area; the Shop Building can be seen in the background

CEMOF layout
1 Wastewater Treatment Unit
2 Train Washer
3 Service & Inspection Area
4 Shop Building
5 Loading Dock
6 Central Control Facility
7 Main Gate
8 Supply Warehouse

Caltrain's CEMOF replaced an old 22-acre (8.9 ha) Southern Pacific Railroad maintenance yard formerly located on the same site. The entire facility includes a central control building, a three floor, 58,800-square-foot (5,500 m^{2}) maintenance shop building, a machine to wash trains, one 3,000 sq ft (279 m^{2}) water treatment plant, a fueling station and railroad tracks for train storage. About 150 people work at the site and three shifts of workers keep the facility staffed at all times.

The Train Washer is an automated washing machine that cleans the exterior of half of Caltrain's fleet each day or at least twice a week, up from twice a year before the facility. The machine can clean a five-car train in about 25 minutes using water from two 35,000 US gallons (132,000 L) cisterns. The water used in the cleaning process is processed through the Wastewater Treatment Unit and 80% is reused to wash another train. The Washer is located to the northwest of the maintenance shop.

The Shop Building contains a bridge crane with a lifting capacity of 25,000 pounds (11,000 kg), a drop table to facilitate wheel maintenance, and a wheel truing facility. This new building improves servicing conditions, safety, and efficiency by allowing mechanics to work indoors rather than outdoors. In addition, Caltrain can perform maintenance tasks once conducted by out-of-state contractors, such as wheel-truing.

Daily repair tasks are carried out in the Service & Inspection Area, consisting of an outdoor facility with two pits each 800 feet (240 m) long and 6 feet (1.8 m) deep. There are two tracks that traverse the facility. In Spring 2008, a 70,000 US gal (265,000 L) fuel tank was installed there to facilitate on-site fueling; prior to its installation, refueling trains was performed by bringing tanker trucks alongside the trains. The Service & Inspection Area is located immediately adjacent to the northeast of the three-story Shop Building.

The train maintenance facilities are separated from the east yard area by active railroad tracks, so a 250-foot-long (76 m) tunnel was built to facilitate employee movement under the active tracks. Work on the east yard area, which contains the Loading Dock, Central Control Facility (housing railroad dispatchers and controllers), and modular buildings for conductors and engineers, began in June 2006.

== See also ==
- Caltrain
