= Lawrence station (Caltrain) =

Train station in Sunnyvale, California, U.S.

Lawrence
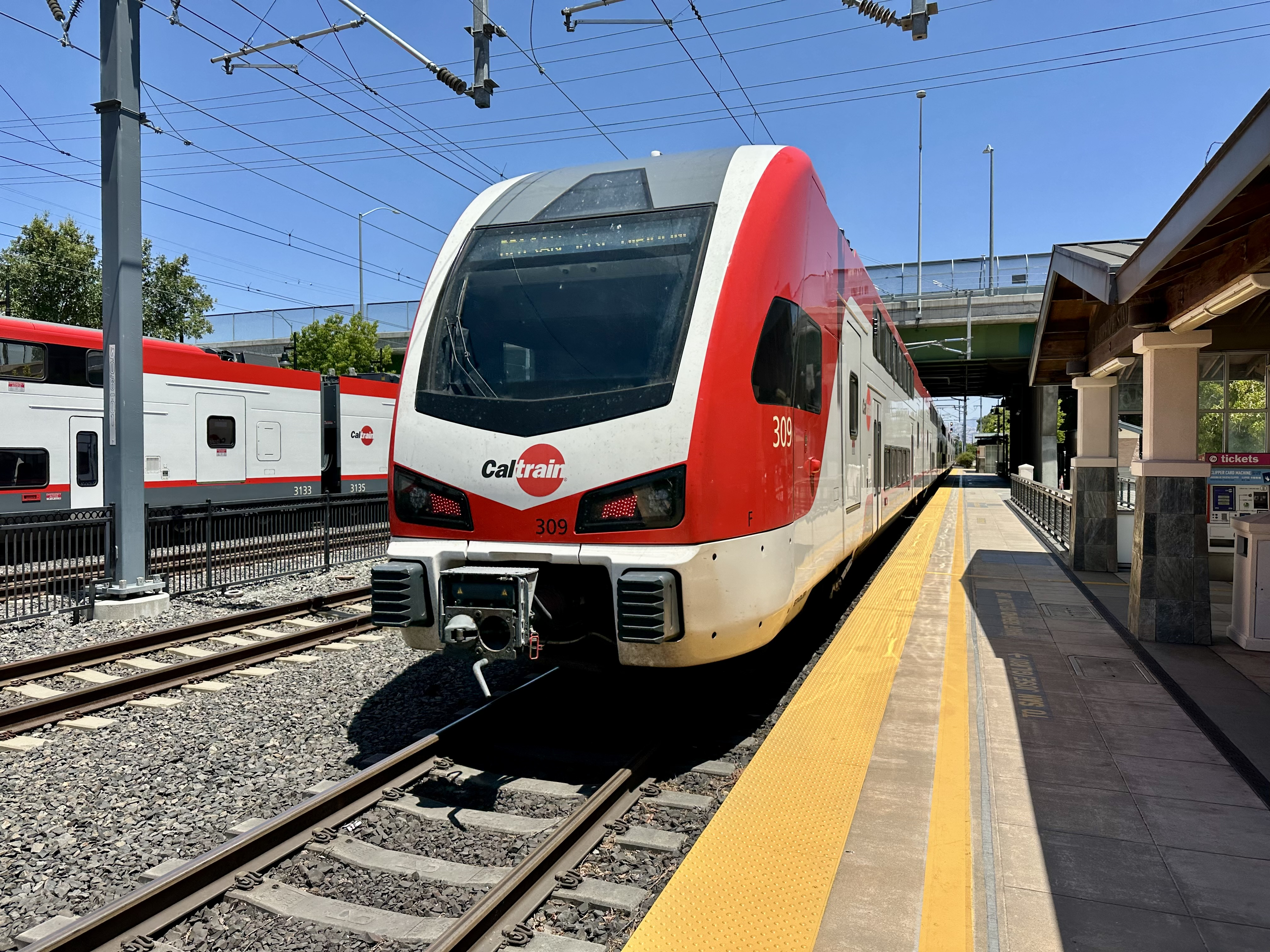
- A southbound train departs Lawrence station in June 2025

General information
- Location: 137 San Zeno Way; Sunnyvale, California
- Coordinates: 37°22′14″N 121°59′46″W
- Owner: Peninsula Corridor Joint Powers Board (PCJPB)
- Line: PCJPB Peninsula Subdivision
- Platforms: 2 side platforms
- Tracks: 4
- Connections: VTA: 21

Construction
- Parking: 122 spaces
- Accessible: Yes

Other information
- Fare zone: 4

History
- Original company: Southern Pacific

Passengers
- FY 2025: 686 (weekday avg.) ▲34%

Services
| Preceding station | Caltrain | Following station |
|---|---|---|
| Sunnyvale toward San Francisco | Local | Santa Clara toward San Jose Diridon or Tamien |
| Sunnyvale toward San Francisco | Limited | Santa Clara toward San Jose Diridon |
| Sunnyvale toward San Francisco | Weekend Local | Santa Clara toward San Jose Diridon or Tamien |
Express does not stop here
Former services
| Preceding station | Caltrain | Following station |
|---|---|---|
| Sunnyvale toward San Francisco | Local (L1) | Santa Clara toward San Jose Diridon or Tamien |
| Sunnyvale toward San Francisco | Weekend Local (L2) | Santa Clara toward San Jose Diridon or Tamien |
| Sunnyvale toward San Francisco | Limited (L3) | San Jose Diridon or College Park toward San Jose Diridon, Tamien or Gilroy |
| Preceding station | Southern Pacific Railroad | Following station |
| Sunnyvale toward San Francisco | Coast Line | Santa Clara toward Los Angeles |
Location

Lawrence station is a Caltrain commuter rail station located in Sunnyvale, California. The station has four tracks with side platforms serving the outer tracks.

The original station at the site was established by the San Francisco and San Jose Railroad, which completed the first rail link between San Francisco and San Jose in 1864. A station referred to as "Lawrence's" appeared in timetables by August 1866. It was named after Alfred Chester Lawrence, who donated the land and served as the station agent until his death in 1886.

The line was later acquired by the Southern Pacific, which operated Lawrence station until its closure in 1945. Caltrain reopened the station in 1982 or 1983.
