= Santa Clara Transit Center =

Train station in Santa Clara, California, US

Santa Clara
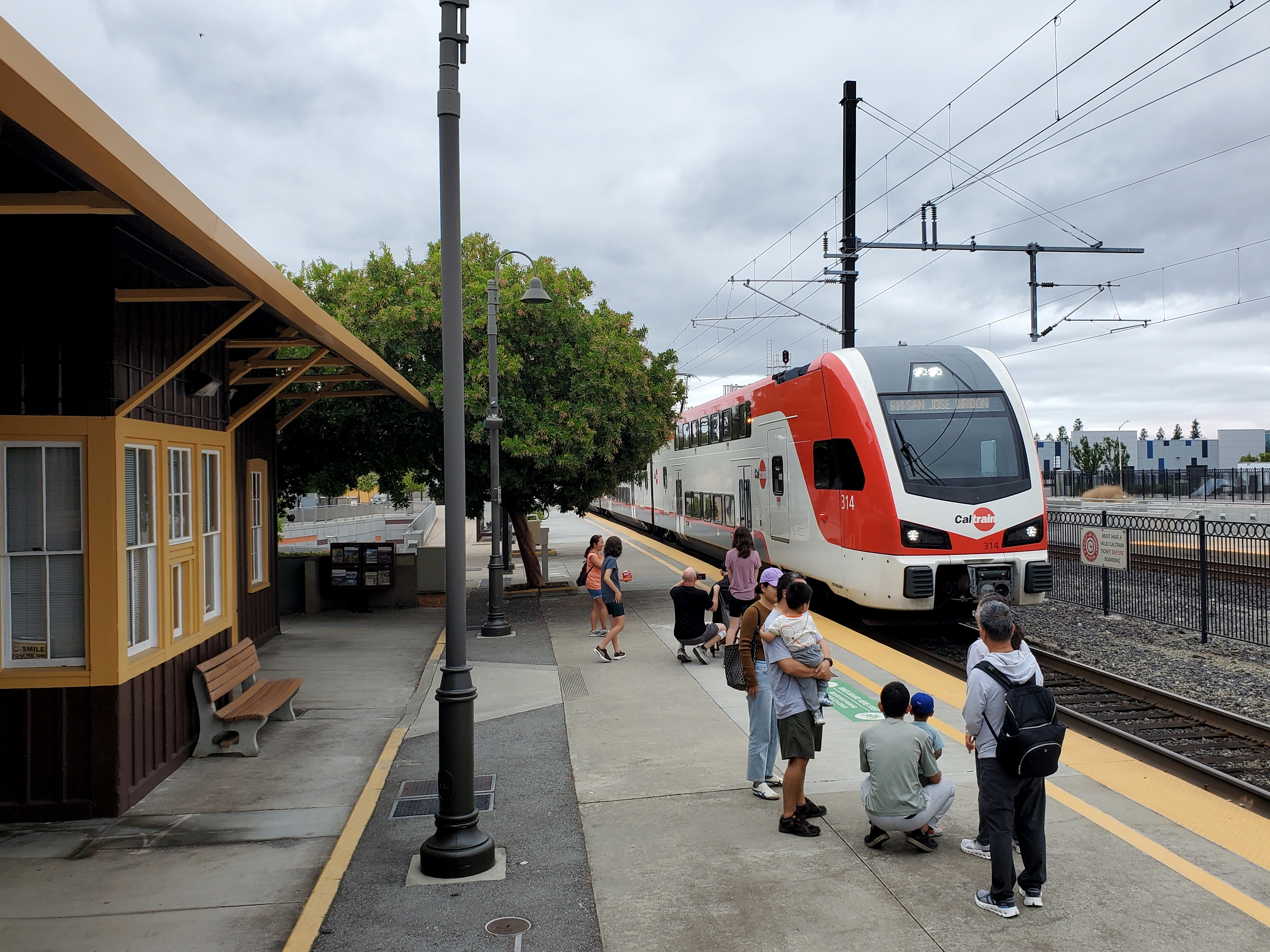
- A southbound Caltrain train at the station in 2025

General information
- Location: 1001 Railroad Avenue; Santa Clara, California; United States
- Coordinates: 37°21′11″N 121°56′11″W
- Owner: Peninsula Corridor Joint Powers Board (PCJPB)
- Lines: PCJPB Peninsula Subdivision; UP Coast Subdivision
- Platforms: 1 side platform, 1 island platform
- Tracks: 5
- Connections: VTA Bus: 21, 22, 53, 59, 60, Rapid 522; San José International Airport (via VTA Bus 60)

Construction
- Parking: 321 spaces
- Cycle facilities: 18 racks, 8 lockers
- Accessible: Yes

Other information
- Station code: Amtrak: SCC
- Fare zone: 4 (Caltrain)

History
- Opened: December 28, 1863
- Rebuilt: 2005–2012
- Original company: Southern Pacific

Passengers
- FY 2025: 839 (weekday avg.) ▲41% (Caltrain)
- FY 2025: 40,932 annually (Amtrak)
Services
Preceding station	Amtrak	Following station
Santa Clara–Great America toward Auburn	Capitol Corridor	San Jose Terminus
Coast Starlight does not stop here
Preceding station	Caltrain	Following station
Lawrence toward San Francisco	Local	San Jose Diridon or College Park toward San Jose Diridon or Tamien
Lawrence toward San Francisco	Limited	San Jose Diridon Terminus
Lawrence toward San Francisco	Weekend Local	San Jose Diridon toward San Jose Diridon or Tamien
Express does not stop here
Preceding station	Altamont Corridor Express	Following station
Great America toward Stockton	San Jose – Stockton	San Jose Terminus
Former services
Preceding station	Caltrain	Following station
Lawrence toward San Francisco	Local (L1)	San Jose Diridon or College Park toward San Jose Diridon or Tamien
Lawrence toward San Francisco	Weekend Local (L2)	San Jose Diridon toward San Jose Diridon or Tamien
Sunnyvale toward San Francisco	Limited (L4)	San Jose Diridon or College Park toward San Jose Diridon, Tamien or Gilroy
Sunnyvale toward San Francisco	Limited (L5)	San Jose Diridon toward San Jose Diridon or Tamien
Preceding station	Southern Pacific Railroad	Following station
Lawrence toward San Francisco	Coast Line	San Jose toward Los Angeles
Mountain View toward San Francisco	Del Monte	San Jose toward Monterey
Agnew toward Oakland Pier	South Pacific Coast Railroad	San Jose toward Santa Cruz
Lawrence toward San Francisco	Peninsula Commute	College Park toward San Jose
Future services
Preceding station	Bay Area Rapid Transit	Following station
Diridon toward Daly City	Green Line Silicon Valley extension	Terminus
Diridon toward Richmond	Orange Line Silicon Valley extension	Terminus
- Santa Clara Depot
- U.S. National Register of Historic Places
- Architect: SF & SJ Railroad
- NRHP reference No.: 85000359
- Added to NRHP: February 28, 1985
Location

The Santa Clara Transit Center (also called Santa Clara–University by Capitol Corridor) is a railway station in downtown Santa Clara, California. It is served by Caltrain, Amtrak Capitol Corridor, and Altamont Corridor Express (ACE) trains. It is the planned terminus for the Silicon Valley BART extension into Santa Clara County on the future Green and Orange Lines. The former station building, constructed in 1863 by the San Francisco and San Jose Railroad, is used by the South Bay Historical Railroad Society as the Edward Peterman Museum of Railroad History.

== Station design ==
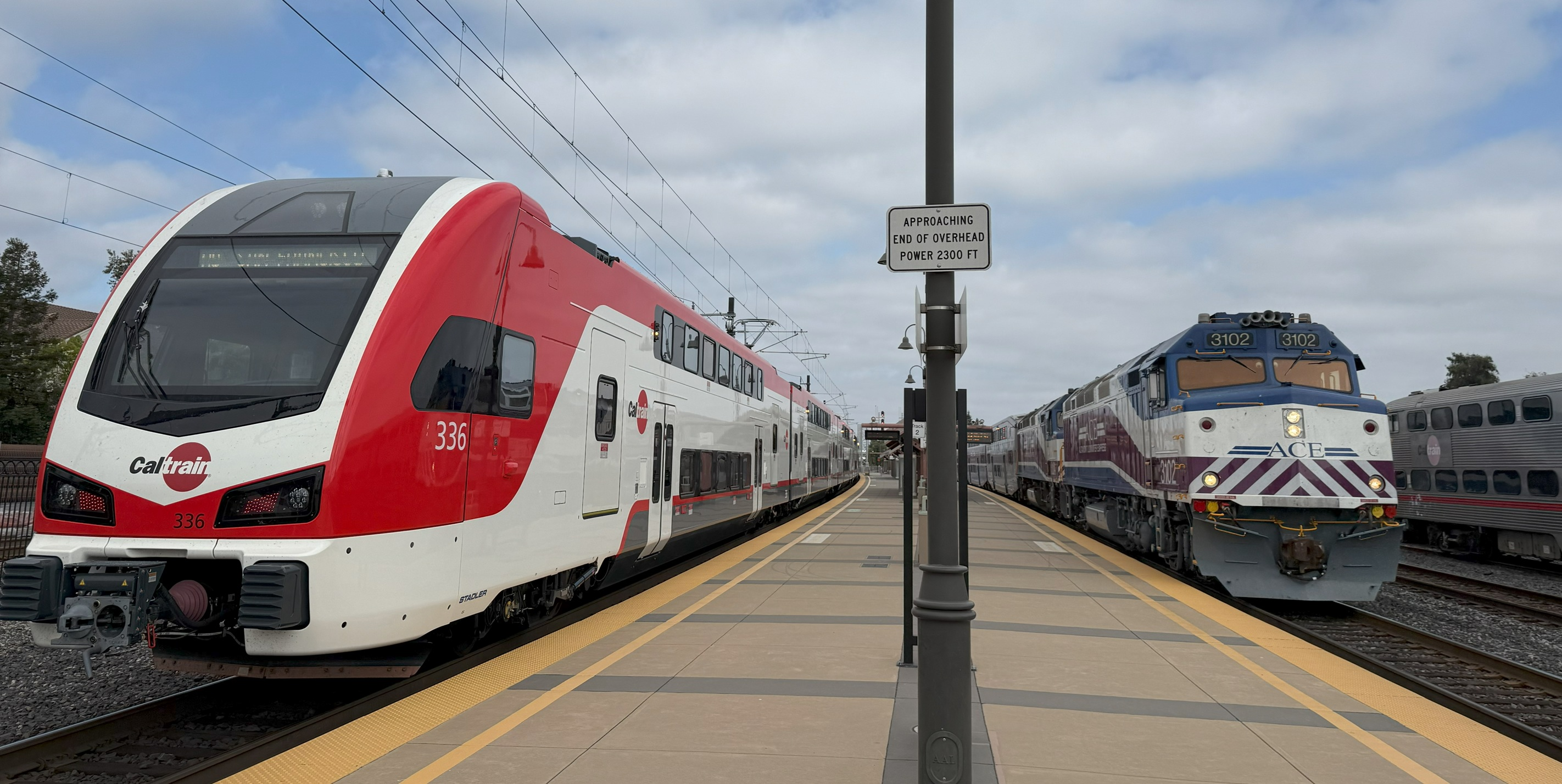
Caltrain (left) and ACE trains at the station

The station is an intermodal transportation center, with Caltrain and Altamont Corridor Express train service and bus service operated by the Santa Clara Valley Transportation Authority (VTA). The station is served by VTA Bus routes 21, 22, 53, 59, 60 to San José International Airport, and Rapid 522.

The station has a side platform serving the southbound Caltrain track (Track 3) and an island platform for the northbound Caltrain track (Track 2) and the ACE/Amtrak track (Track 1), allowing cross-platform transfer. The island platform is connected to the side platform by a pedestrian tunnel that was completed in 2012. Additional tracks northeast of Track 1 are used by Union Pacific freight trains.

== History ==
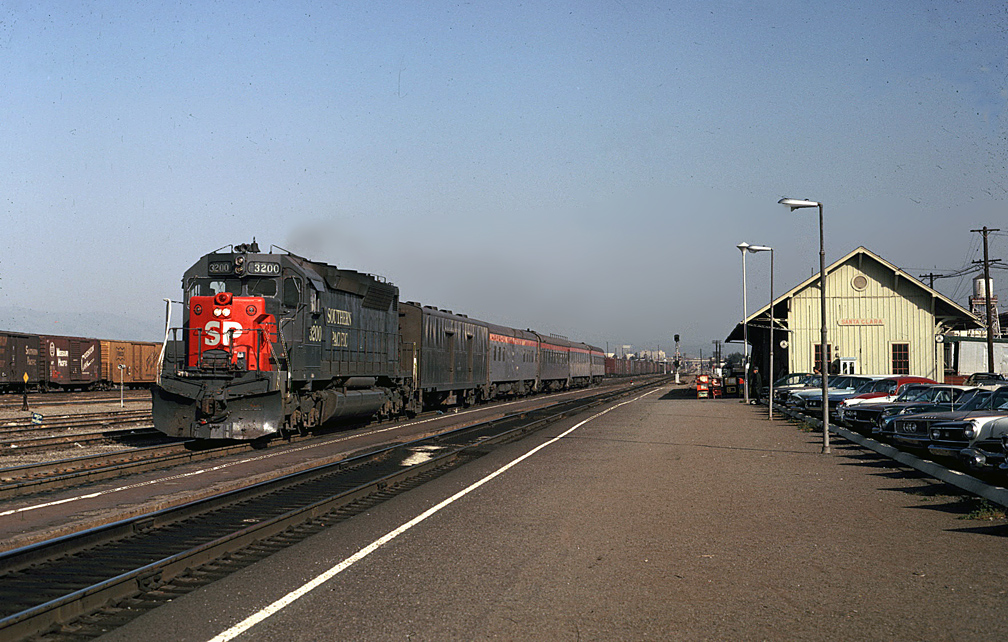
The Coast Daylight at Santa Clara in 1971

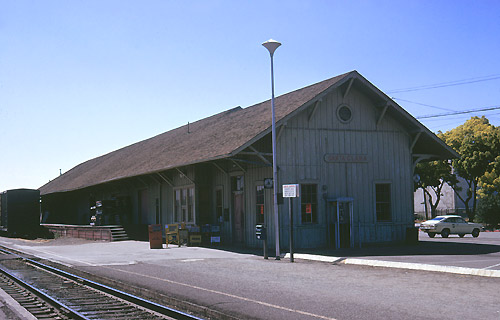
The station building in 1974

The Santa Clara depot, built by the San Francisco and San Jose Railroad in late 1863, was the oldest continuously operating railroad depot in the State of California until the ticket office was closed in May 1997. The original 24-by-50-foot (7.3 m × 15.2 m) board and batten depot was one of the two "way stations" built between San Francisco and San Jose. Plans for a railroad linking San Francisco and San Jose began as early as 1851. Though the 1851 scheme ultimately failed, the incorporation of the San Francisco and San Jose Railroad in 1859 met with success. Most of the financing for the project came from county government in San Francisco, San Mateo and Santa Clara counties, with the University of Santa Clara and local industry also playing a significant role in both stock acquisition and choice of placement of the depot in Santa Clara.

The first passenger service to San Francisco started on December 28, 1893, with the final few miles to San Jose completed the following month. The Southern Pacific Railroad acquired the San Francisco & San Jose Railroad in 1868. The depot, originally on the east side of the tracks, was moved to its present location in 1877 and attached to the existing 32-by-50-foot (9.8 m × 15.2 m) freight house constructed several years earlier. Because of the large volume of agricultural freight shipped from the depot, the freight house was increased in size at that time to its present dimensions of 32 by 160 feet (9.8 m × 48.8 m).

On November 1, 1877, the San Jose Mercury reported the facility nearing completion. Following construction of the railroad, farming and fruit-related industries developed in the Santa Clara area, with the depot serving as a focal point for shipping. Rail service provided the direct link to San Francisco and, in the later 1870s, to Southern California. Typical of these efforts were those of James A. Dawson, who pioneered the area's fruit-canning industry in 1871. By the turn of the century, the Pratt-Low Preserving Company, the largest fruit packing plant in central California, was located just south of the depot.

Caltrans acquired the depot from Southern Pacific in 1980. It was placed in the National Register of Historic Places in 1985. In cooperation with the South Bay Historical Railroad Society, a nonprofit group founded the same year, they began renovation work in 1986 on the depot, by then badly in need of repair. A group of volunteers spent over 25,000 hours hauling away debris, replacing support timbers, siding, exterior decking and interior flooring, scraping peeling paint, painting and many other repairs. With the major renovation complete since 1992, this 156-year-old building hosts a railroad library and museum with 2 large model railroad layouts and many other artifacts while still serving its original function as a passenger depot.

Santa Clara was added as a station for the Altamont Corridor Express (ACE) on March 5, 2001. ACE service to the station was discontinued on July 29, 2005, to allow for platform construction. ACE service to Santa Clara resumed on May 14, 2012; Amtrak Capitol Corridor trains began stopping at the station on May 21. As of 2024, Amtrak plans to modify the platform for accessibility by FY 2025.

=== Future ===
Santa Clara is planned to be the terminal station for the second phase of the Silicon Valley BART extension. Santa Clara was chosen as the terminal because of the access to the San Jose International Airport as well as the proposed BART maintenance facility located in the vicinity of the station at the former Union Pacific rail yard. A new island platform will be constructed with a pedestrian underpass. An 800-space parking facility is included in the plans, and VTA is expected to develop transit oriented spaces adjacent the station.

The station was considered for California High-Speed Rail, but was rejected on the grounds that it was too close to the nearby, and much larger, Diridon Station in San Jose, and that the airport traffic that it would receive would not be enough to justify maintaining a separate station. It was also considered as the terminal for a people mover to the airport; however, San Jose Diridon was later chosen as the terminal.
