= College Park station (Caltrain) =

Train station in College Park, San Jose, California, U.S.

College Park
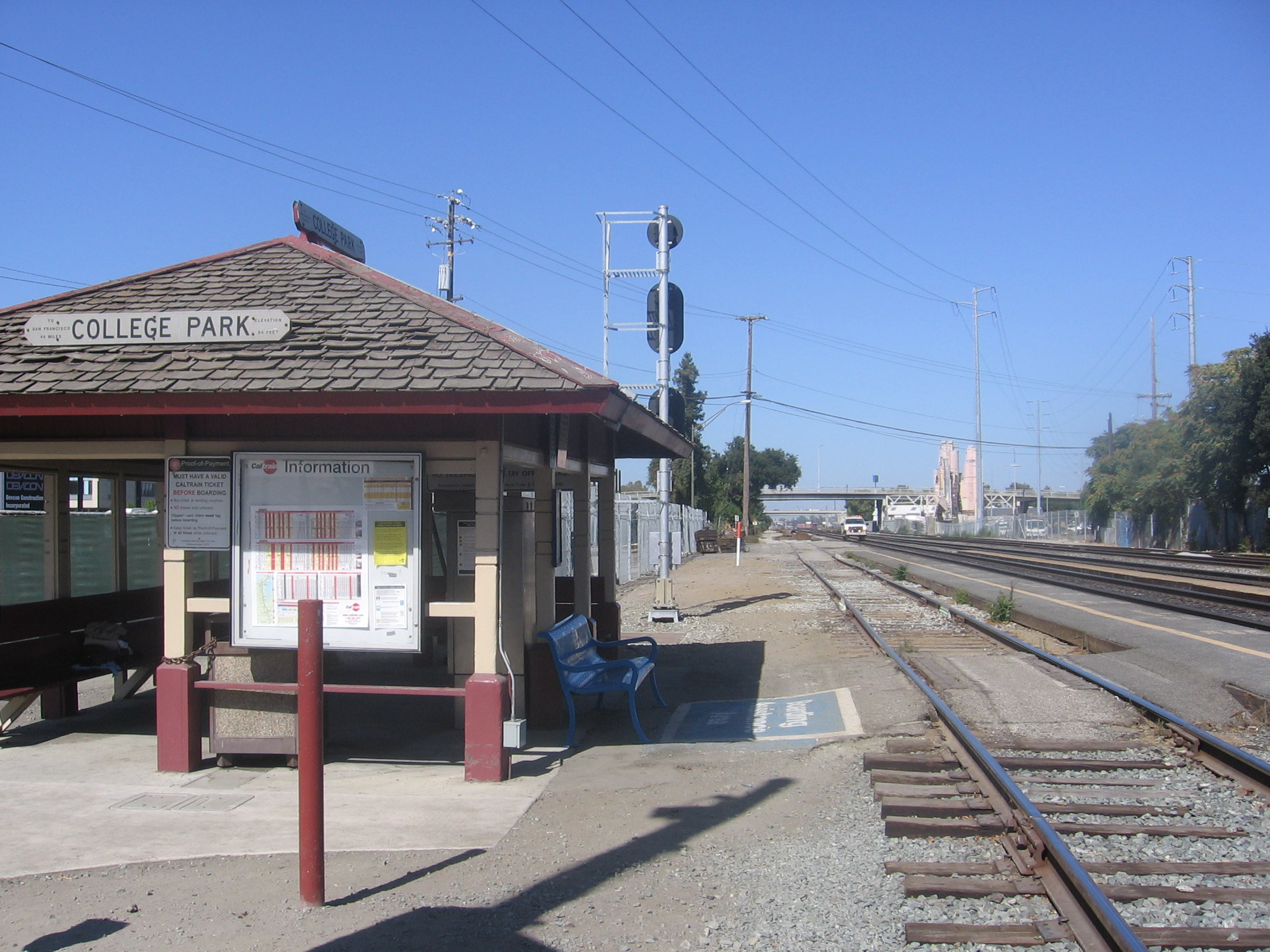
- College Park station in September 2012

General information
- Location: 780 Stockton Avenue; San Jose, California
- Coordinates: 37°20′34″N 121°54′56″W
- Owner: Peninsula Corridor Joint Powers Board (PCJPB)
- Line: PCJPB Peninsula Subdivision
- Platforms: 2 island platforms
- Tracks: 5
- Connections: VTA: 61

Construction
- Accessible: Partial, no wheelchair lift available

Other information
- Status: Limited-service, weekday-only

History
- Original company: Southern Pacific

Passengers
- FY 2025: 41 (weekday avg.) ▼5%

Services
Preceding station	Caltrain	Following station
Santa Clara toward San Francisco	Local (two daily round trips)	San Jose Diridon toward Tamien
Limited does not stop here
Express does not stop here
Weekend Local does not stop here
Former services
Preceding station	Caltrain	Following station
Santa Clara toward San Francisco	Local (L1) Train #106 only	San Jose Diridon toward Tamien
Lawrence toward San Francisco	Limited (L3) Train #307 only	San Jose Diridon Terminus
Santa Clara toward San Francisco	Limited (L4) Trains #405 & #408 only	San Jose Diridon toward Gilroy
Preceding station	Southern Pacific Railroad	Following station
Santa Clara toward San Francisco	Peninsula Commute	San Jose Terminus
Santa Clara toward San Francisco	Peninsula Commute	Market Street Depot before 1935 Terminus
Location

College Park station is a limited-service, weekday-only Caltrain station serving the College Park neighborhood and the Bellarmine College Preparatory school in San Jose, California.

== Service ==
The station is served by four trains per weekday. During each rush hour, one northbound local train from Tamien and one southbound local train from San Francisco serve the station. There is no weekend service.

Due to the small size of the station platforms, only the three northern-most cars of each train open their doors to allow passengers to board and alight. The two southern cars do not open.

The station has a boarding assistance area so that train crews may offer help to passengers with disabilities. However, the station does not have a wheelchair lift, limiting the accessibility of the station.

== History ==
Before Caltrain, College Park was a station on Southern Pacific's Peninsula Commute line, in fare zone 6 (brown). It is mentioned in Jack London's 1903 novel The Call of the Wild as the location at which the stolen canine protagonist is fenced, beginning his journey away from civilization.

In August 2005, service was reduced from 12 daily trains to four. The nearby students at Bellarmine College Preparatory who use the station have a history of protesting to protect it from removal.

The platform is planned to be rebuilt to accommodate through-running California High-Speed Rail service.
