= Sunnyvale station =

Train station in Sunnyvale, California, U.S.

Sunnyvale
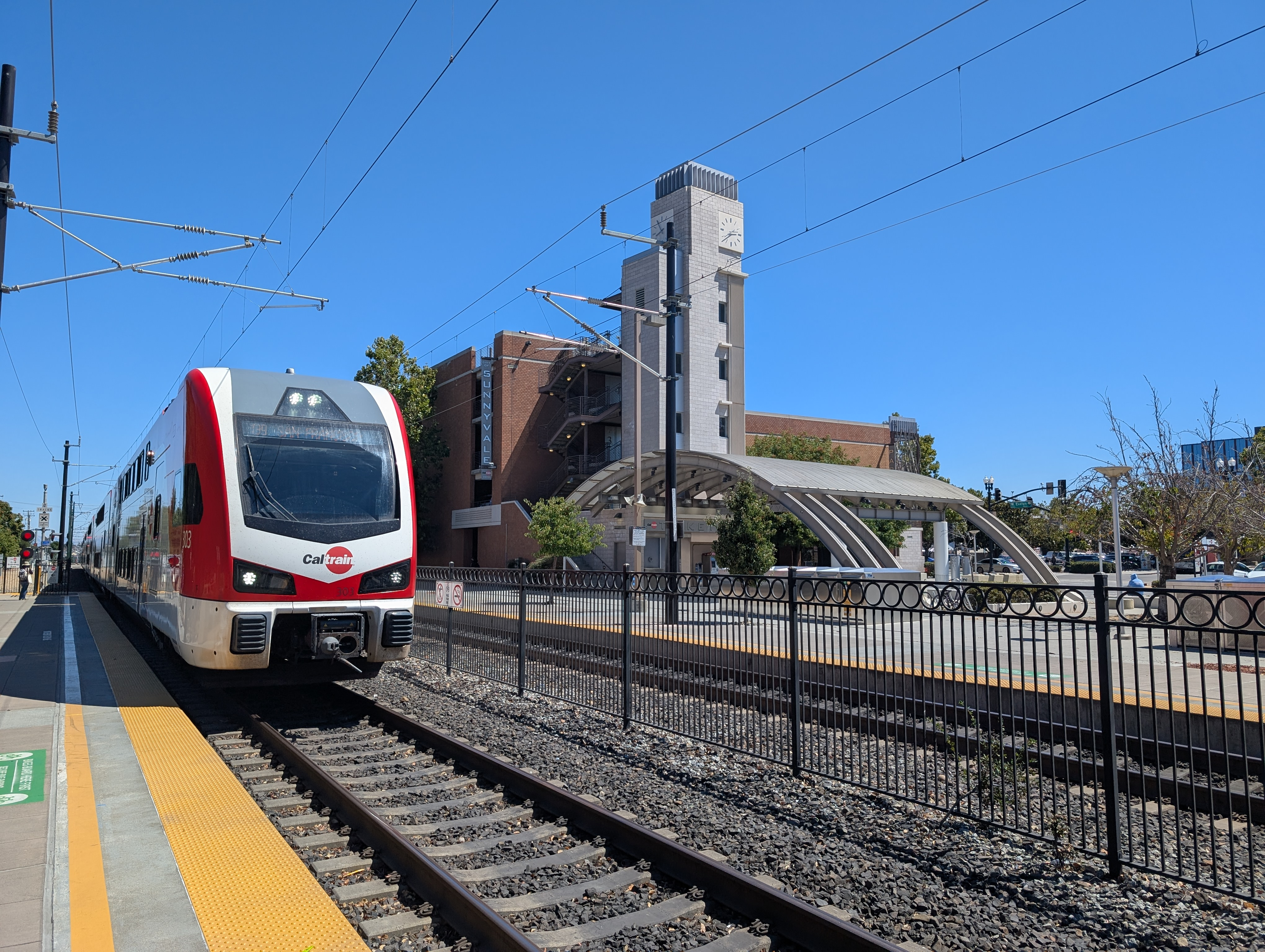
- A northbound train at Sunnyvale station in 2025

General information
- Location: 121 West Evelyn Avenue; Sunnyvale, California; United States
- Coordinates: 37°22′43″N 122°01′51″W
- Owner: Peninsula Corridor Joint Powers Board (PCJPB)
- Line: PCJPB Peninsula Subdivision
- Platforms: 2 side platforms
- Tracks: 2
- Connections: VTA: 20, 21, 53, 55, Rapid 523

Construction
- Structure type: At-grade
- Parking: 446 spaces; paid
- Cycle facilities: 18 racks and 20 (Note: 74 additional lockers available through the VTA Sunnyvale Transit Center) lockers
- Accessible: Yes

Other information
- Fare zone: 3
- Website: www.caltrain.com/station/sunnyvale

History
- Opened: Between 1864 (162 years ago) and 1886 (140 years ago)
- Rebuilt: 2003
- Electrified: April 2024
- Former names: Murphy's Station
- Original company: Southern Pacific Railroad

Passengers
- FY 2025: 1,770 per weekday ▲55%

Services
Preceding station	Caltrain	Following station
Mountain View toward San Francisco	Local	Lawrence toward San Jose Diridon or Tamien
Mountain View toward San Francisco	Limited	Lawrence toward San Jose Diridon
Mountain View toward San Francisco	Express	San Jose Diridon Terminus
Mountain View toward San Francisco	Weekend Local	Lawrence toward San Jose Diridon or Tamien
Former services
Preceding station	Caltrain	Following station
Mountain View toward San Francisco	Local (L1)	Lawrence toward San Jose Diridon or Tamien
Mountain View toward San Francisco	Weekend Local (L2)	Lawrence toward San Jose Diridon or Tamien
Mountain View toward San Francisco	Limited (L3)	Lawrence toward San Jose Diridon, Tamien or Gilroy
Mountain View toward San Francisco	Limited (L4)	Santa Clara toward San Jose Diridon, Tamien or Gilroy
Mountain View toward San Francisco	Limited (L5)	Santa Clara toward San Jose Diridon or Tamien
Preceding station	Southern Pacific Railroad	Following station
Mountain View toward San Francisco	Coast Line	Lawrence toward Los Angeles
Location

Sunnyvale station is a Caltrain station in Sunnyvale, California. The station is within walking distance of Sunnyvale's historic downtown and the Cityline Sunnyvale shopping center.

== History ==
On July 27, 1861, Martin Murphy Jr. donated part of his property to the San Francisco and San Jose Railroad. The railroad was completed in early 1864, and Murphy's Station was included in the Southern Pacific Railroad's San Francisco–San Jose line by 1886. In 1912, the station was renamed Sunnyvale.

The station plaza and parking structure were built in 2003, replacing the earlier station building.

In March 2018, work began on the Sunnyvale Station Rehabilitation Project, which shifted the north pedestrian crossing further north by approximately 80 feet to accommodate six-car trains at station platforms. Work was completed in April 2019.
