= List of Portuguese Americans =

This is a list of notable Portuguese Americans, including both original immigrants who obtained American citizenship and their American descendants.

== Art and architecture ==
- João de Brito (born 1958), painter, sculptor, artist.
- Nathan Oliveira (December 19, 1928 – November 13, 2010), American painter, printmaker, and sculptor, born in Oakland, California to Portuguese parents.
- William Pereira (1909–1985), architect, Cape Canaveral, UC Irvine, CBS Television City & Transamerica Pyramid in San Francisco.
- Mel Ramos (July 24, 1935 – October 14, 2018), U.S. figurative painter, whose work incorporates elements of realist and abstract art.
- Edgar Mosa (born 1986), jeweler and artist.
- Pedro Joseph de Lemos (1882–1954), was an American painter, printmaker, architect, illustrator, writer, lecturer, museum director and art educator in the San Francisco Bay Area.

== Business ==
- Buddy DeSylva (1895–1950), American songwriter, movie producer & co-founder of Capitol Records.
- Izzy Gomez, Portuguese immigrant, chef and restaurateur in the North Beach neighborhood of San Francisco, California. In 1943, he was recognized by LIFE Magazine as one of San Francisco's most colorful characters.
- Teresa Heinz Kerry (born 1938), philanthropist, heiress of H.J. Heinz Company, widow of Henry John Heinz III, and wife of John Kerry. (Mozambican-born Portuguese)
- Helder Antunes (born 1963), is a Portuguese-American executive, computer scientist, and former racecar driver. A Cisco Systems executive for over twenty years, as well as founder and first Chairman of the OpenFog Consortium, Antunes currently serves as chief executive officer of Crowdkeep.
- Carlos M. Cardoso, is an American businessman. He is the Principal of CMPC Advisors and the former Non-Executive Chairman of Garrett Advancing Motion. Cardoso was the chairman, president and chief executive officer of the Kennametal, a metalworking and tool production company headquartered in Latrobe, Pennsylvania.
- Ronald Oliveira, is an American businessman, the former CEO of Revolut USA, and the former President of Avidbank.
- Ernest Morgado (1917–2002), was a businessman and community leader known for creating huli-huli chicken. He served as a chief petty officer in naval intelligence during World War II.

== Culinary ==
- Emeril Lagasse is a Portuguese-American celebrity chef, restaurateur, television personality, and cookbook author.
- David Leite is the Portuguese-American publisher of the two-time James Beard Award-winning website Leite's Culinaria. He has written for The New York Times, Martha Stewart Living, Bon Appétit, Saveur, Food & Wine, Gourmet, Food Arts, Men's Health, The Los Angeles Times Magazine, Chicago Sun Times, The Washington Post, and other publications in the United States and abroad.
- George Mendes is the Portuguese-American executive chef of Aldea, a Michelin starred restaurant in New York City.
- Chris Santos is a New York City chef and the former executive chef and owner of The Stanton Social on New York's Lower East Side.
- Jason Santos is a Boston-based restaurateur, cookbook author, runner-up on Hell's Kitchen season 7 and has appeared on Bar Rescue seasons 5, 6, 7, 8 and 9.
- Kevin Sousa (chef) is a professional private chef and consultant. He was previously the executive chef and co-owner of Superior Motors, an American restaurant which opened in July 2017 in Pittsburgh, Pennsylvania. He was previously the chef/co-owner of Salt of the Earth, Union Pig & Chicken and Station Street Food.

== Film and television ==
- Krista Allen (born 1972), model (maternal grandfather of Portuguese descent).
- Bruno de Almeida (born 1965), filmmaker (both parents are Portuguese).
- Joaquim de Almeida (born 1957), actor (24).
- Marliece Andrada, (born August 22, 1972), Playboys Playmate of the Month for March 1998; She joined the cast of Baywatch in the 1997 season.
- Mary Astor (1906–1987), Academy Award winning actress (starred in The Maltese Falcon w/ Humphrey Bogart), maternal grandfather was of Portuguese descent
- Camilla Belle (born 1986), actress (her mother is Brazilian-Portuguese)
- Sada (formerly Sara) Bettencourt, featured in the reality series The Real L Word (Portuguese-born parents)
- Rowan Blanchard (born 2001), actress. (Portuguese mother)
- Brooke Burke (born 1971), model/TV show host: "Wild On..." (Portuguese grandfather).
- Auliʻi Cravalho (born 2000), actress and singer, Moana.
- Richard E. Cunha (1922–2005), was an American cinematographer and film director. Cunha's father was Albert "Sonny" Cunha, an American songwriter. During World War II, Cunha served as an aerial photographer for the military, and then was transferred to Hal Roach Studios in Los Angeles, where he made military training films, newsreels and documentaries.
- Dorothy DeBorba (1925–2008), 1930s child actor, Our Gang, Little Rascals series. (Portuguese Azorean ancestry).
- Frank Delima (born 1949), comedian.
- Joe DeRita (1909–1993), "Curly Joe" of the Three Stooges.
- Louise Fazenda (1895–1962), silent comedy films actress
- Shiloh Fernandez, American actor of Portuguese and Russian descent.
- Ana Carolina da Fonseca (born October 25, 1978), American film and television actress, television personality and model. She was born in São Paulo, Brazil, to Portuguese parents; she moved to the United States at age 12.
- Lyndsy Marie Fonseca (born 1987), American actress; of 3/4 Portuguese ancestry
- Hal De Forrest (born 1862, Portugal – died February 16, 1938, New York City), Portuguese-born American early silent film actor.
- Dave Franco (born 1985), actor.
- James Franco (born 1978), actor, director, screenwriter, and film producer; paternal grandfather was of Portuguese descent
- Tom Franco (born 1980), actor.
- Khalid Gonçalves (born 1971), actor/musician. Both parents were from Portugal.
- Natalie Gregory, 1980s child actress, Alice in Wonderland and Oliver & Company
- Jasmine Guy (born March 10, 1962)[1], American actress, singer and dancer. She is best known for her starring role as Whitley Gilbert in the television sitcom A Different World and Roxy in Dead Like Me.
- Colin Hanks (born 1977), actor.
- Tom Hanks (born 1956), 2-time Academy Award-winning American actor, voice-over artist and movie producer, two of his mother's grandparents were Azorean, and two of his father's grandparents were Azorean, making him half Portuguese on both sides.
- Emeril Lagasse (born 1959), chef and host of LIVE! Cooking with Emeril.
- Kevin Lima – American film director who has directed a number of Disney films
- Vanessa Marcil (born 1969), actress known for her roles in the long-running soap opera General Hospital, Gina on Beverly Hills, 90210, mother is of partial Portuguese descent.
- Mandell Maughan, best known for her role as Maggie on CBS' Me, Myself & I (Both parents are Portuguese)
- Danica McKellar (born 1975), American actress best known for her role as Winnie Cooper in the television show The Wonder Years.
- Tamara Mello (born 1976), actress, she appeared in the TV series Popular as Lily
- Jesse Metcalfe (born 1978), actor, 22 appearances on Desperate Housewives (mother is of Portuguese and Italian descent)
- Carmen Miranda (1909–1955), actress and singer.
- Shanna Moakler (born 1975), model, actress. Wife of Blink 182 drummer Travis Barker.
- Wendy Moniz (born 1971), best known for her role as Dinah Marler Thorpe Jessup on the daytime soap opera Guiding Light.
- Edgar Morais (born 1989), actor
- Vasco Nunes (1974–2016), born in Lisboa, Director of Photography, Producer and director, Produced two Grand Jury Prizes at Sundance Film Festival, has several films in the permanent collection of the Museum of Modern Art in NYC, and many cinema, TV and music projects completed.
- Nestor Paiva (1905–1966), 1930s–60s actor who appeared on Get Smart, The Beverly Hillbillies, and The Addams Family.
- Harold Peary (1908–1985), American actor, comedian and singer.
- Kevin Pereira (born 1982), co-host of G4's Attack of the Show!
- Frank Perry (1930–1995), film director, uncle of singer Katy Perry
- Jada Pinkett-Smith, American actress of African-American, West Indian, Creole, and Portuguese-Jewish ancestry.
- Pedro Mendonça Pinto (born 1975 in Lisbon, Portugal), Portuguese-American journalist who is currently a sports anchor for CNN International based in London, England.
- Amy Poehler (born 1971), actress and comedian (Irish, English, German and Portuguese descent)
- J. G. Quintel (born 1982), Emmy Award-winning Animator and writer; Creator of Regular Show. Father is Azorean Portuguese.
- Keanu Reeves (born 1964), best known for his role as Neo in the action film trilogy The Matrix. (English, Portuguese, Irish, Chinese and Native Hawaiian descent)
- Daniela Ruah (born 1983), best known for her role Kensi Blye in the CBS series NCIS: Los Angeles (Portuguese Jewish, Ashkenazi Jewish, and 1/16th Spanish)
- Al Santos (born 1976), New York actor/model. (Portuguese & Irish ancestry)
- Tom Silva, general contractor on the PBS show This Old House.
- Alicia Sixtos, actress
- John Soares, director, actor, editor, and fight choreographer known for Sockbaby and The Danger Element. (Portuguese-born grandparents).
- Joe Souza, actor. His grandmother is from Lisbon, Portugal.
- Tammie Souza, meteorologist
- Katie Stevens (born 1992), actress of Portuguese descent on her mother's side.
- Jonathan Taylor Thomas (born 1981), actor and former teen idol. (Portuguese-American maternal grandfather)
- Dilshad Vadsaria (born 1985), actress.
- Karen Valentine (born May 25, 1947; Sebastopol, California), American actress of Italian and Portuguese extraction. She is best known for her role as the idealistic schoolteacher "Alice Johnson" in the television series Room 222.
- Meredith Vieira (born 1953), host of NBC's Today and the syndicated game show Who Wants To Be A Millionaire.
- Joe Alves (born 1936), is an American film production designer, perhaps best known for his work on Close Encounters of the Third Kind and the first three films of the Jaws franchise. He directed the third installment Jaws 3-D.
- Tom Silva (born 1946 or 1947), is an American construction contractor and television personality notable for his long-running participation in the PBS shows This Old House and Ask This Old House.

== Literature ==
- Millicent Borges Accardi, Portuguese-American poet. She has received literary fellowships from the National Endowment for the Arts (NEA), the California Arts Council, Barbara Deming Foundation, Fulbright (Scholar), CantoMundo, Yaddo, Creative Capacity, Fundação Luso-Americana. Accardi has served as Poet Laureate of Topanga Canyon in Souther California.
- Allison Adelle Hedge Coke, Portuguese-American poet and writer (Enos family). She is a Distinguished Professor of Creative Writing at the University of California Riverside and has received several literary fellowships including the Library of Congress (Witter Bynner), Fulbright (Scholar), California Arts Council (Legacy Artist), Fundação Luso-Americana, Mellon (Dean's Professorship), Daniel and Maggie Inouye Distinguished Chair in Democratic Ideals, Paul and Clarice Reynolds Distinguished Chair.
- Larry Correia, Portuguese-American fantasy novelist, known for his Monster Hunter and Grimnoir Chronicles series.
- Nancy Vieira Couto, well established Portuguese-American poet, born in 1942. She lives in Ithaca, New York.
- John Dos Passos (1896–1970), major Portuguese-American novelist, journalist, playwright and artist.
- Charles Reis Felix (1923–2017), writer.
- Frank X. Gaspar (born 1946), poet and novelist. Ferrol A. Sams Distinguished Chair, Writer in Residence at Mercer University and teaches in the MFA Writing Program at Pacific University, Oregon.
- Brian Haberlin, writer and comic book artist. Co-creator of the Witchblade franchise and former editor in chief for Spawn, of Portuguese (Madeira, Portugal) and Native Hawaiian heritage on his mother's side of the family and of Azorean Portuguese on his grandfather's Haberlin side of the family.
- Sarah Hoyt (maiden name Sarah Marques d'Almeida), science fiction, fantasy, and historical fiction novelist.
- Emma Lazarus, Portuguese-American Jewish poet born in New York City. She is best known for "The New Colossus", a sonnet written in 1883; its lines appear on a bronze plaque in the pedestal of the Statue of Liberty placed in 1903.
- David Leite, Portuguese American memoirist, food writer, cookbook author, publisher of the two-time James Beard Award-winning website Leite's Culinaria, and an entrepreneur.
- George Leite, California author, poet, publisher and bookstore owner of Portuguese descent active in the San Francisco Bay Area in the 1940s and 1950s.
- Judah Monis (1683–1764), North America's first college instructor of Hebrew language.
- Mordecai Manuel Noah (1785–1851), playwright, diplomat, journalist, and utopian.
- Sam Pereira (born 1949), American poet.
- Stephen Rebello, American writer, screenwriter and former clinical therapist. Born to parents of third-generation Portuguese-American and French-Portuguese American extraction in Fall River, Massachusetts, Rebello was raised in Somerset, Massachusetts.
- Daniel Silva (born 1960), American author who writes thriller/espionage novels.
- Danielle Steel (born 1947), writer. (Portuguese mother)
- Katherine Vaz, novelist, short story writer, children's story writer, a Briggs-Copeland Fellow in Fiction at Harvard University and Fellow of the Radcliffe Institute for Advanced Study who has been awarded multiple times, including the Drue Heinz Literature Prize, Discovery Prize, Prairie Schooner Award, New York Film Academy and Writer's Store national contest for a screenplay idea based on one of her stories, and is the only Luso Writer included in the Hispanic Division of the Library of Congress.
- Richard Zimler, best-selling author who earned a 1994 National Endowment of the Arts Fellowship in Fiction and the 1998 Herodotus Award. He has been published in many countries and translated into more than 20 languages. Zimler lives in Porto, Portugal, and was a professor of journalism at the University of Porto and College of Journalism for 16 years. He has been a naturalized Portuguese citizen since 2002.

== Photography ==
- Vasco Nunes (1974–2016), born in Lisboa, director of photography, producer and director. Produced two Grand Jury Prizes at Sundance Film Festival, has several films in the permanent collection of the Museum of Modern Art in NYC, and many cinema, TV and music projects completed.
- Pete Souza (born 1954), American photojournalist and the chief White House photographer for President Barack Obama. Pete Souza is of Portuguese descent.

== Military ==
- Uriah P. Levy (1792–1862), Commodore of the U. S. Navy, known for his purchase and restoration of Thomas Jefferson's estate, Monticello.
- Sgt. Leroy A. Mendonca – of Pauoa, Hawaii was a Portuguese-American soldier in the United States Army; died in the Korean War at age 19, becoming the youngest soldier awarded the Medal of Honor (posthumously) in the United States on July 4, 1951.
- Major-General Suzanne Vares-Lum (born 1967), served in Iraq War
- Jerry Vasconcells – World War I flying ace.
- George Luz (1921–1998), World War II – E Company, 2nd Battalion of the 506th Parachute Infantry Regiment of the 101st Airborne Division.
- George Mendonsa (1923–2019), World War II – George Mendonsa claimed to be the sailor photographed kissing a nurse in Times Square as people celebrated the end of World War II on Aug. 14, 1945.
- George J. Peters (1924–1945), World War II - was a soldier of the United States Army and a recipient of the highest decoration of the United States Armed Forces—the Medal of Honor—for his actions in the final stages of World War II during Operation Varsity.
- Jack Teixeira (born 2001), airman in the 102nd Intelligence Wing of the Massachusetts Air National Guard. In April 2023, Teixeira was accused of violating the Espionage Act after disclosing hundreds of Pentagon documents onto a Discord server, leading to his arrest.
- Ralph E. Dias (1950–1969), Vietnam War. Was a United States Marine who posthumously received the Medal of Honor for heroism in Vietnam in November 1969.
- John R. D'Araujo Jr. (born 1943), Vietnam War. He is the first Portuguese American to achieve the rank of major general.
- Jonathan P. Braga (born 1969), is a United States Army lieutenant general, serving as the commanding general of United States Army Special Operations Command since 13 August 2021.
- Peer de Silva (1917–1978), was a station chief in the Central Intelligence Agency (CIA). A 1941 West Point graduate, during World War II he served as an Army officer providing security for the Manhattan Engineer District; this undercover project sought to build the first atomic bomb. After the war, he joined a pre-CIA military intelligence unit.
- Marc Gonsalves (born 1972), Gonsalves served as an imagery analyst in the United States Air Force for eight years prior to becoming a contractor employed by California Microwave Systems, a subsidiary of Northrop Grumman.
- Francis B. Spinola (1821–1891), He also served as a general in the Union Army during the American Civil War.
- Jake Ashby, is an American politician and occupational therapist from the state of New York. A Republican, Ashby represents the 43rd district in the New York State Senate since 2023. He is a former Captain in the United States Army Reserve, serving for eight years and completing tours in Afghanistan and Iraq.
- Edward Pimental (June 19, 1965 – August 8, 1985), was an American soldier of the United States Army who was murdered by the Red Army Faction in West Germany.
- Mark S. Martins (born 1960), is a retired United States Army officer. He attained the rank of brigadier general in the United States Army Judge Advocate General's Corps. Martin's final position was Chief Prosecutor of Military Commissions, overseeing the trial of Khalid Sheik Mohammed and four co-defendants.
- Nicholas J. Cutinha (January 13, 1945 – March 2, 1968), was a United States Army soldier and a recipient of the United States military's highest decoration—the Medal of Honor—for his actions in the Vietnam War.
- John B. DeValles (1879–1920), was a Catholic priest who founded the first Portuguese parochial school at Espirito Santo Church in Fall River, Massachusetts, and later served with distinction as a U.S. Army chaplain during World War I.
- Harold Gonsalves (1926–1945), was a United States Marine Corps private first class who was killed in action during the Battle of Okinawa in World War II. He was awarded the nation's highest military award for valor, the Medal of Honor, posthumously, for his heroic action on April 15, 1945.
- Alexander St. Clair Abrams (1845-1931), was an American attorney, politician, and writer. He fought in the Confederate Army beginning in 1861 and later wrote A full and detailed history of the siege of Vicksburg. In 1880, Abrams founded the city of Tavares, Florida.
- Joseph E. Carrico (1925-1988), was an American management consultant and tennis official. During World War II, he served in the United States Navy.
- Paul J. Selva (born 1958), is a retired United States Air Force four-star general who served as the tenth vice chairman of the Joint Chiefs of Staff.

== Music ==
- Priscilla Ahn (born 1984), Singer. She also features her knowledge of the Portuguese language on her song "I Am Strong" featuring DJ Tiesto.
- Sara Bareilles (born 1979), singer-songwriter and actress.
- Nuno Bettencourt (born 1966), Guitarist for Extreme.
- Sarah Borges, rock and roll musician from Taunton, Massachusetts, signed to Sugar Hill Records.
- Craig Chaquico (born 1954) is an American guitarist of Portuguese descent. He has had over thirty years of success in a variety of genres: in the 1970s with the post-Summer of Love Jefferson Starship, in that band's 1980s incarnation, Starship, and in the 1990s and 2000s as contemporary jazz and New Age solo artist.
- Mary Costa (born 1930), American singer and actress, who is best known for providing the voice of Princess Aurora in the 1959 Disney film, Sleeping Beauty. She is also a professional opera singer.
- Phil Demmel (born 1967), Guitar player for Metal-band Machine Head.
- Dev (born 1989), singer.
- Dez Fafara (born 1966), vocalist in the Metal-bands DevilDriver and Coal Chamber.
- Hugo Ferreira, rock musician and singer-songwriter for the band Tantric.
- Sky Ferreira (born 1992), singer and songwriter.
- Kevin Figueiredo (born 1977), drummer for Extreme.
- Don Ho (1930–2007), Hawaiian musician, of Chinese, Portuguese, Hawaiian, Dutch and German heritage.
- Hoku (born 1981), Hawaiian pop star and actress, daughter of Don Ho
- Tynisha Keli (born 1985), R&B and pop singer-songwriter.
- Vincent Lopez (1895–1975), one of the top bandleaders of the Roaring Twenties.
- Demi Lovato (born 1992), American singer with half Mexican, half Irish roots. Their Mexican heritage can be traced back to Portugal.
- Phil Madeira (born 1952), is an American songwriter, producer, musician and singer.
- Teena Marie (1956–2010), American singer. Father was Portuguese.
- Glenn Medeiros (born 1970), Hawaiian singer.
- Jason C. Medeiros (born September 9, 1977) better known as Mr. J. Medeiros is an American rapper, record producer, and songwriter. As well as releasing music under the name, Mr. J. Medeiros, he is responsible for forming the Hip Hop group The Procussions, is one half of the Hip Hop/Electronic duo AllttA, and the lead singer of Punk-Rap group thebandknives.
- Dave Mello (born 1969), is an American musician known primarily for his work as drummer for the hardcore ska punk band Operation Ivy.
- Mishlawi (born 1996), American born hip-hop artist who grew up in Portugal.
- O.C. (born 1972) Brooklyn, New York MC and member of hip hop stable Diggin' In The Crates (Portuguese grandparents)
- Elmar Oliveira, violinist who, in 1978, was the first American to win the gold medal in Moscow's Tchaikovsky competition.
- Sean Paul (born 1973), Grammy winner, reggae/pop. (Portuguese-Jewish, African, English and Chinese heritage)
- Joe Perry (born 1950) – Lead guitarist and contributing songwriter for the rock band Aerosmith.
- Katy Perry (born 1984), singer and songwriter, of German, English and Portuguese descent, more specifically "Azorean" with roots in Horta, Faial, disclosed the HuffPost.
- Linda Perry (born 1965), songwriter, 2-time Grammy winner. (Portuguese father/ Brazilian mother)
- Steve Perry (born 1949), Former lead singer of the rock band Journey and solo artist.
- Poppy (born 1995), American singer-songwriter and YouTube personality of Portuguese descent from Nashville, Tennessee.
- Ronnie Radke (born 1983), American singer, songwriter, rapper, musician, and record producer. Former Escape the Fate and current Falling in Reverse vocalist. Radke was born in 1983 in Las Vegas to a mother who is Portuguese.
- Joe Raposo (1937–1989), American composer and lyricist, 5-time Grammy winner.
- Joe Raposo (born 1970), bassist for the punk rock band Lagwagon
- John Reis (born 1969), also known by the pseudonyms Speedo, Slasher, and The Swami, is an American musician, singer, guitarist, record label owner, and disc jockey. Reis was born in 1969 in the Ocean Beach area of San Diego, California to Portuguese American heritage.
- David Lee Roth (born 1954), American rock vocalist for Van Halen. (Grandmother from Azores, Portugal).
- Curtis Salgado (born 1954), American singer and harmonica player.
- David Silveria (born 1972), is an American musician, best known as the original drummer for nu metal band Korn from 1993 until leaving the band in 2006.
- John Philip Sousa (1854–1932), American composer known as The March King, inventor of the Sousaphone.
- Steve "Zetro" Souza (born 1964), singer
- Bela Sumares (1912-1980), singer and radio performer
- Freddie Tavares (1913–1990), helped designed Fender Stratocaster and other Fender products, steel guitarist
- Ray Toro (born 1977), lead guitarist and backing vocalist of the band My Chemical Romance
- Ramana Vieira, contemporary Portuguese-American singer of the traditional Portuguese Fado. January–February 2001 edition of Mundo Português Magazine called Vieira, "The New Voice of Portuguese World Music."

== Patriots ==
- Peter Francisco (1760–1831), American Revolution patriot.
- Emma Lazarus (1849–1887), poet and essayist, best known for a sonnet about the Statue of Liberty, "The New Colossus", which was engraved on the statue's pedestal, welcoming immigrants to the United States: "Give me your tired, your poor, Your huddled masses yearning to breathe free, The wretched refuse of your teeming shore, Send these, the homeless, tempest-tossed to me, I lift my lamp beside the golden door!"
- John Philip Sousa (1854–1932), composer of many marching band songs. Wrote "Stars and Stripes Forever" aboard a steam freighter while traveling from Terceira to the U.S. (Portuguese father)

== Politics ==
- Duke Aiona (born 1955), American politician who served as Lieutenant Governor of Hawaii (2002–2010). He is of Hawaiian, Chinese, and Portuguese descent.
- Maria Araújo Kahn (born 1963/1964), former associate justice of the Connecticut Supreme Court (2017–2023) and United States circuit judge of the United States Court of Appeals for the Second Circuit. She was born in Angola to Portuguese parents.
- John Arruda (John M. Arruda), Mayor of Fall River, Massachusetts, for six years.
- Judah Philip Benjamin (1811–1884), American politician and lawyer. He was born a British subject in Saint Croix, during the British occupation of the Danish West Indies (now U.S. Virgin Islands), to Phillip Benjamin, an English Jew, and his wife, Rebecca Mendes, a Portuguese Jew.
- Mariano S. Bishop (1906–1953), labor organizer and union leader who served in turn as principal organizer, director, and executive vice president of the Textile Workers Union of America.
- Francisco L. Borges (born 1951), business executive and former Connecticut State Treasurer; born in Cape Verde of African descent.
- Matt Borges, Chairman of the Ohio Republican Party from 2013 to 2017
- Ben Nighthorse Campbell, former U.S. Senator, mother was an immigrant from Portugal
- Dennis Cardoza (born 1959), former member of the United States House of Representatives (2003–2012), from California, grandparents from the Azores.
- Benjamin N. Cardozo (1870–1938), former U.S. Supreme Court Justice (1932–1938).
- Francis Lewis Cardozo (1836–1903), clergyman, politician, and educator. He was the first African American to hold a statewide office in the United States. Francis Cardozo was the son of a free black woman, Lydia Weston, and a Portuguese-Jewish man, Isaac Cardozo, who worked at the customhouse.
- Tony Coelho (born 1942), former member of the United States House of Representatives (1979–1989), from California, grandparents from two different islands in the Azores.
- Jasiel Correia (born 1991), mayor of Fall River, Massachusetts.
- Jim Costa (born 1952), member of the U.S. House of Representatives, from California, grandparents from the Azores.
- Mary L. Fonseca (1915–2005), Massachusetts state senator
- Joseph Francis (born 1973), Joseph F. Francis, former member of the Massachusetts State Senate.
- André Heinz (1969), politician, one of the heirs of H.J. Heinz Company, and son of Teresa Heinz. Portuguese on mother's side)
- Michael Machado, former member of the California State Assembly and State Senate.
- Jack M. Martins (born 1967), member of the New York State Senate, representing Nassau County, New York. Martins is a former Mayor of Mineola, New York. Martins is a first-generation American, born to parents who emigrated from northern Portugal in the 1960s.
- Dina Matos McGreevey (born 1966), former New Jersey First Lady.
- Devin Nunes, member of U.S. House of Representatives from California.
- Marc R. Pacheco (born 1952) Member of Massachusetts House of Representatives (1989–1993) Member of the Massachusetts Senate (1993–Present), He is Dean of the Massachusetts Senate, the longest continuously serving member of the Senate currently serving. All four grandparents were Portuguese, three from the Azores and one from the Mainland. He has received the Highest civilian award from Portugal "The Order of Prince Henry the Navigator". He has received the Grand Decoration of Honor in Gold with Star from the Republic of Austria and for his work in support of the nation of East Timor's fight for independence he was awarded the Medal of the Order of East Timor.
- Richard Pombo (born 1961), former Member of the U.S. House of Representatives from California (1993–2007).
- Michael A. Rice (born 1955), biologist & Rhode Island state legislator since 2009.
- Francis Salvador (1747–1776),
- Ronald A. Sarasin, former Member of the U.S. House of Representatives (1973–1979) from Connecticut.
- Patrick Joseph "Pat" Toomey Sr. (born November 17, 1961), U.S. senator from Pennsylvania. (Native of Providence, Rhode Island. Portuguese-American mother). He is a member of the Republican Party, and succeeded Arlen Specter. He served as the U.S. representative for Pennsylvania's 15th congressional district from 1999 to 2005. Descent from the Azores.
- Lori Trahan (born 1973), U.S. Representative from Massachusetts
- David Valadao (born 1977), U.S. Representative from California
- John Vasconcellos (1932–2014), former member of the California State Assembly and State Senate. (Portuguese father/ German mother).
- Nick Freitas (born 1979), member of the Virginia House of Delegates
- John Duarte, is an American politician, businessman, and pistachio farmer.
- Edmund Dinis (1924–2010), was a Portuguese-born American politician from Massachusetts.
- Jacinto F. Diniz (1888–1949), was a Portuguese-born American politician and businessman.
- Richard R. Silva (1922–2009), was an American politician who was a member of the Massachusetts House of Representatives and mayor of Gloucester, Massachusetts. During World War II he served as a signalman in the United States Coast Guard. After the war Silva was a service technician for the Massachusetts Electric Company.
- Charles William Carrico Sr., is an American politician who served as a member of the Senate of Virginia from 2012 to 2020, representing the 40th district. He was previously a member of the Virginia House of Delegates from 2002 to 2012.

== Religion ==
- Stephen Peter Alencastre (1876–1940), Hawaiian Roman Catholic prelate.
- John da Silva Antão (born March 1933, Salreu, Estarreja, Portugal), priest in the Archdiocese of Newark, religious leader of the Portuguese-American community in New Jersey and a community leader in Elizabeth, New Jersey.
- Marcelino Manoel de Graça (1882–1960), born in Brava, Cape Verde, Charismatic religious leader, also known as "Sweet Daddy Grace", who founded the United House of Prayer for All People in the Harlem area of New York. His congregation, made up mainly of African Americans, included over three million people.
- William Joseph Levada (1936–2019), Roman Catholic archbishop. Ancestor's name Oliveira.
- Steven J. Lopes (born 1975), Roman Catholic Bishop of the Personal Ordinariate of the Chair of Saint Peter
- Humberto Sousa Medeiros (1915–1983), Cardinal of the Roman Catholic Church.
- Gershom Mendes Seixas (1745–1816), first American born rabbi, patriot, personal friend of George Washington and religious leader of the Portuguese Synagogue of New York.
- Clarence Richard Silva (born 1949), Roman Catholic Bishop of Hawaii.
- Daniel Brum, Bishop Daniel of Chicago (secular name David Anthony Brum; born November 16, 1954) is the hierarch of the Orthodox Church in America, archbishop of the Diocese of Chicago and the Midwest.

== Science and medicine ==
- Goncalo R. Abecasis (born 1976) – geneticist at the University of Michigan. One of the world's most cited scientists in 2009.
- Robert L. Carneiro (1927–2020) – prominent anthropologist and curator of the American Museum of Natural History
- António Damásio (born 1944) – Portuguese-American neuroscientist/neurobiologist. He is a University Professor and David Dornsife Professor of Neuroscience at the University of Southern California (where he also heads the Brain and Creativity Institute), an adjunct professor at the Salk Institute and the author of several books describing his scientific thinking.
- Gregg Gonsalves (born 1964) – Assistant Professor of Epidemiology at Yale University and a recipient of a 2018 MacArthur Fellowship
- Craig C. Mello (born 1960) – winner of 2006 Nobel Prize for Medicine.
- George Perry (born 1953) – Alzheimer's disease researcher noted for his discovery of the role of oxidative stress in Alzheimer's disease.
- Manuela Maria Veloso (born 1957) – Head of the Machine Learning Department at Carnegie Mellon University & Herbert A. Simon University Professor in the School of Computer Science at Carnegie Mellon University.
- Paul Silva (1922–2014), was a phycologist, marine biologist, and algal taxonomist considered to be the world's leading expert in the chlorophyte green algal genus Codium. Silva completed his undergraduate degree at the University of Southern California, though his education was interrupted by World War II. He served in the US Navy on the USS Darby, participating in the Battle of Leyte Gulf.
- John D. Silva (1920–2012), was the chief engineer for KTLA-TV in Los Angeles, California and is most famous for inventing the first telecopter, or a helicopter fitted with a TV camera in 1958. In 1942 he joined the Navy as a radar operator and was among the 91 wounded when the destroyer Shea was attacked by Japanese bombers during World War II.
- Milton Silveira, was an American aerospace engineer, pilot and academic, serving as NASA's Chief Engineer between 1983 and 1986.
- Robert Freitas (born 1952), is an American nanotechnologist.
- Herbert S. Eleuterio (1927–2022), was an American industrial chemist noted for technical contributions to catalysis, polymerization, industrial research management, and science education.
- Wayne Sousa, s a well-known biologist and ecologist. He works at the University of California, Berkeley as a professor and chair of the Department of Integrative Biology.

== Sports ==
=== Baseball ===
- Joseph Lawrence "Joe" Abreu (1913–1993), Major League Baseball infielder. He played nine seasons in professional baseball, one at the major league level. He served in the United States Navy during World War II.
- Kevin John Correia, (born 1980), baseball pitcher for the Pittsburgh Pirates. On December 17, 2010, the Pirates signed Correia to a 2-year, $8 million deal. On March 24, 2011, the Pirates named Correia their Opening Day starter.
- Rod Correia (born 1967), played three seasons for the California Angels (1993–1995)
- Sid Fernandez (born 1962), National League baseball player (Native Hawaiian, Portuguese and Spanish).
- Lew Fonseca (1899–1989), born in Oakland, California; infielder, American League batting champion with Cleveland, coach for Chicago Cubs, manager of the Chicago White Sox; pioneered the use of film to analyze player performance, director of MLB films.
- Tony Freitas (1908–1994), was an American baseball player who played as a pitcher in the minor leagues and Major League Baseball. Freitas served in the U.S. Army Air Corps during World War II from 1943 to 1945 and was stationed at Mather Air Force Base.
- Jonny Gomes (born 1980), former MLB and NPB outfielder and designated hitter.
- Billy Martin (1928–1989), New York Yankees and Oakland Athletics manager. (Martin's father was from the Azores and later immigrated to Hawaii)
- Dustin Pedroia (born 1983), former second baseman for the Boston Red Sox, American League MVP in 2008.
- Mark Teixeira (born 1980), former first baseman for the Texas Rangers, Atlanta Braves, Los Angeles Angels, and New York Yankees.
- Shane Victorino (born 1980), former MLB outfielder, two-time World Series champion with the Philadelphia Phillies and Boston Red Sox (Portuguese, Hawaiian and Japanese).
- Ed Fernandes (1918–1968), was an American professional baseball catcher whose 18-year career included one full season and part of another in Major League Baseball as a member of the 1940 Pittsburgh Pirates and 1946 Chicago White Sox. He returned to the minor leagues from 1941 to 1944, then spent 1945 serving in the United States Navy during the final year of World War II.
- Charlie Silvera (1924–2019), was an American Major League Baseball player and coach. Nicknamed Swede, he was part of six World Series championships with the New York Yankees. He missed the 1943–1945 seasons serving in World War II.

=== Basketball ===
- Jason Kapono (born 1981), basketball forward for the Philadelphia 76ers. (Hawaiian and Portuguese descent).
- Ticha Penicheiro (born 1974), basketball player for the Sacramento Monarchs.

=== Golf ===
- Billy Andrade (born 1964), pro golf player.
- Tony Lema (1934–1966), winner of numerous professional golf tournaments; at the time of his death he ranked tenth in all-time earnings in the PGA.

=== Mixed martial arts ===
- Chad Mendes (born 1985)
- Randy Costa (born 1994)
- Tim Sylvia (born 1976)
- Wesley Correira (born 1978)
- Brad Tavares (born 1987)

=== Boxers ===
- Al Mello (1906–1993), was an American Olympic and professional boxer who was a contender for the world middleweight title in 1929–30. He held the New England Welterweight title during his career. Al enlisted in the Army during World War II, and was involved in the Italian Campaign.
- Babe Herman (boxer) (1902–1966), was an American featherweight boxer.
- Bobo Olson (1928–2002), was an American boxer. He was the World Middleweight champion between October 1953 and December 1955,[1] the longest reign of any champion in that division during the 1950s.
- Harold Gomes (1933), is an American former professional boxer who competed between 1951 and 1963.
- Billy Murray (boxer), was an American boxer in the early 20th century.

=== Soccer ===
- Kimberly Maria Brandão (born 1984), professional women's soccer player who is currently a captain of the full Portugal Women's National Team and also the team captain of professional franchise, Buffalo Flash, a western New York state team which is the most recent winner of the United Soccer Leagues' W-League.
- Altino "Tino" Domingues (born 1951), retired soccer defender. He played professionally in the United States and earned four caps with the U.S. national team in 1976.
- Adelino William ("Billy") Gonsalves (sometimes spelled in the Portuguese form, Gonçalves) (1908–1977), soccer player, sometimes described as the "Babe Ruth of American Soccer". He spent over 25 years playing in various American professional leagues and was a member of the U.S. squad at the FIFA World Cup in 1930 and 1934. He is a member of the National Soccer Hall of Fame.
- Manuel "Manny" Matos, retired soccer midfielder from New Bedford, Massachusetts who played professionally in the North American Soccer League and American Soccer League.
- Manuel "Manny" Matos (born 1953), retired soccer player from Mineola, New York who played professionally in the North American Soccer League and Major Indoor Soccer League.
- Carlos Mendes (born 1980), soccer manager and former player currently serving as head coach of New York Cosmos B.
- Fred "Fredy" Pereira (born 1954), former soccer forward who spent three seasons in the North American Soccer League and earned six caps with the U.S. national team in 1977.
- Telmo Pires (born 1953), retired Portuguese-American soccer player professionally in the North American Soccer League, American Soccer League and Major Indoor Soccer League. He earned one cap with the United States men's national soccer team in 1975.
- Claudio Reyna (born 1973), former captain of the U.S. national soccer team.
- Giovanni Reyna (born 2002), son of Claudio Reyna, is a footballer, who plays attacking midfield for Borussia Dortmund. Although born in England, He has represented the United States at the Under 15, Under 16, and Under 17 level and is expected to play for the United States Men's National Team.
- Andrew Sousa (born 1989), Portuguese American football player from Fall River, Massachusetts; Sousa was drafted in 2011 by the New England Revolution.
- Ed Souza (1921–1979), soccer player.
- John Souza (1920–2012), soccer player.
- Frank Moniz (1911–2004), soccer player.

=== Wrestling ===
- Al Pereira (1906–1990), was an American professional wrestler, known as Al "Power House" Pereira. He held the European Heavyweight Championship twice.
- Timothy Thatcher (born 1983), is an American professional wrestler currently performing for Pro-Wrestling NOAH. He was previously signed to WWE, where he performed on the NXT brand.
- Catherine Joy Perry (born 1985), American female professional wrestler, actress, singer and model known in the WWE as Lana (born via Portuguese father)
- Peter Polaco (born 1973), American professional wrestler.

=== Other sports ===
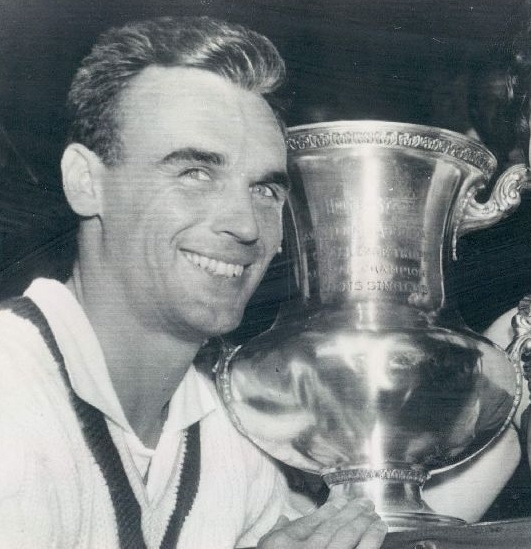
Vic Seixas

- Scott Mendes (born 1969), is an American former professional rodeo cowboy who specialized in bull riding.
- Jimmy Pedro (born 1970), is an American retired World Championship and Olympic judoka and current judo coach.
- James Pedro Sr. (born 1946), is a former national level judoka from the United States and an alternate for the US 1976 Olympic judo team.
- Dennis Alexio (born 1959), former world champion kickboxer in the light heavyweight, cruiserweight and heavyweight divisions.
- Nate Costa (born 1988), football quarterback for the University of Oregon Ducks. He is of Portuguese descent (his father was born on the Azores island of Terceira).
- Juliana "Juli" Furtado (born 1967), mountain biker, who began her sports career in skiing. From 1980 to 1987, she was the youngest member of the U.S. National ski team. Although American by birth, Furtado is of partial Portuguese ancestry.
- Kurt Gouveia (born 1964), football player who played 13 season in the NFL with the Washington Redskins Philadelphia Eagles and San Diego Chargers and was a member of both their 1987 and 1991 Super Bowl Championship teams (Redskins). Gouveia was born in Hawaii.
- Augie Cabrinha (1902–1979), was an American football wingback for the Dayton Triangles of the National Football League. He played college football at Dayton. During World War II, Cabrinha served in the United States Army and attained the rank of captain. He participated in the Battle of Saipan.
- Vic Seixas, Jr., (1923–2024), E. Victor Seixas, Jr. Hall of Fame tennis star who won Wimbledon in 1953 and the U.S. Open Championship in 1954.
- Jamie Silva (James J. Silva) (born 1984), football (safety of Portuguese descent (his family comes from Azores)) player for the Indianapolis Colts of the National Football League. He was signed by the Colts as an undrafted free agent in 2008. He played college football at Boston College.
- Ollie Silva (1929–2005), was an American auto racing driver. Silva served in the United States Army from February 1951 to February 1953, during the Korean War. He later worked as a carpenter and roofer.
- Ralph Neves (1916–1995), was an American Hall of Fame jockey in Thoroughbred horse racing. His long career was interrupted only by several injuries and service in the United States Army Cavalry during World War II; a serious back injury suffered in the war bothered him during the rest of his career.He retired in 1964.
- Alex Ferreira, is an American halfpipe skier. He competed in the 2018 Winter Olympic Games, winning the silver medal in the halfpipe event. He competed in the 2019 Winter X Games XXIII and 2020 Winter X Games XXIV, placing first in the Men's Ski Superpipe.
- Joe Lopes (1964–2002), was an American professional skateboarder.
- Fred Silva (1927–2004), was an American football official in the National Football League (NFL) for 21 seasons from 1968 to 1988. After completing high school, Silva joined the United States Marine Corps and was honorably discharged a year later in 1946.
- Jim Mello (1920–2006), was an American football player. As the Second World War continued to rage, Mello served in the United States Navy from 1944 to 1945.

=== Non-athletes ===
- Wayne Fontes (born 1940), National Football League Coach
- Mike Pereira (born 1950), NFL Officiating Director.
- Pedro Pinto, sports announcer and commentator for World Sports, CNN News Network.
- Fred Silva (1927–2004), Official in the National Football League (NFL) for 21 seasons.
- Eric DeCosta (born 1971), is an American football executive who is the executive vice president and general manager of the Baltimore Ravens of the National Football League (NFL).

== Others ==
- José Joaquim Almeida (1777–1832) Portuguese-born American naturalized corsair who fought in the Anglo-American War of 1812 and the War of Independence of Argentina.
- Cheryl Ann Araujo (1961–1986) Portuguese-American rape survivor whose case became national news, and was the basis of the 1988 film The Accused.
- Joseph "The Animal" Barboza (September 20, 1932 – February 11, 1976) Portuguese-American mafioso and one of the most feared mob hitmen during the 1960s. He is reputed to have murdered at least 26 men in his lifetime—yet never proven.
- Harry L. Carrico (1916-2013), was a member, Chief Justice, and Senior Justice of the Supreme Court of Virginia.
- José "Joseph" Costa, Golden Age aviation pioneer, born in Santa Cruz, Madeira Island, emigrated to Corning, attempted a solo Atlantic crossing in 1936.
- Barbara Graham, American woman who became the third female executed in the California gas chamber; mother was Portuguese-Azorean whose maiden name was Furtado.
- David Leite (born Fall River, Massachusetts) Portuguese American food writer.
- Joe Madureira, comic book artist and videogame developer.
- Paul Charles Morphy, American chess player.
- Dominic Sandoval, American dancer, of mixed Filipino, Indonesian, Hispanic, and Portuguese heritage
- David J. Silva (born 1964), language scholar and university administrator. Both parents were born in the Azores.
- Johnny Jack Nounes (1890–1970) mob boss in Galveston, Texas.
- Timothy Mello, is a mobster associated with the Patriarca crime family.
- Rod Machado, is a pilot and author of aviation flight training materials. He is ATPL rated, and a member of the Aviation Speakers Bureau.
- Bruce Bueno de Mesquita, s a political scientist, professor at New York University, and senior fellow at Stanford University's Hoover Institution.
- Richard J. Leon, is an American jurist who serves as a senior United States district judge of the United States District Court for the District of Columbia.
- Celestino Medeiros (1902–1927), Celestino F. Medeiros was born on March 9, 1902, at Villa Franca, San Miquel of the Azores Islands. He and his parents immigrated to New Bedford around 1904. About Nicola Sacco and Bartolomeo Vanzetti.
- Tyler Oliveira (born 2000) Independent Journalist and YouTuber.

== See also ==
- List of Cape Verdeans
- List of Portuguese people
- Luso-American
- Portuguese Canadians
