= List of people from Taunton, Massachusetts =

The following is a list of notable people from Taunton, Massachusetts, USA. These individuals were born in Taunton, were long-time residents of the city, or were buried within the city limits.

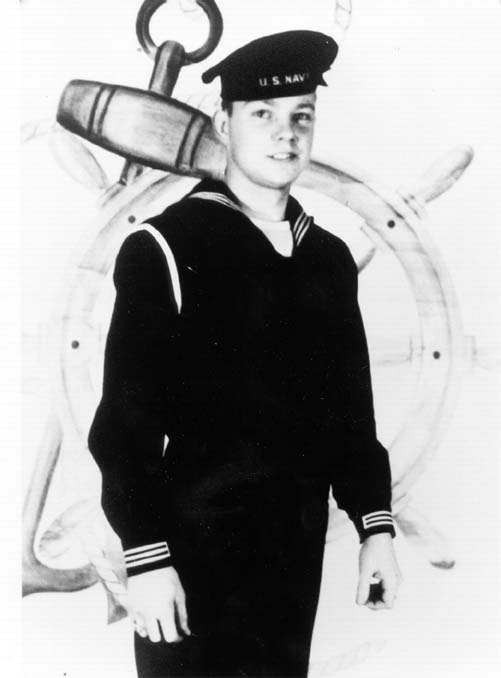
Richard De Wert, U.S. soldier, Medal of Honor recipient

- Isaac Babbitt (1799–1862), inventor, manufactured the first tableware made of Britannia metal; made the first brass cannon cast in the U.S.; patented the Babbitt metal
- David Cobb (1748–1830), state court judge in Massachusetts, 1784; member of Massachusetts House of Representatives, 1789; U.S. representative from Massachusetts 3rd District, 1793–1795; member of Massachusetts Senate, 1802; lieutenant governor of Massachusetts, 1809–1810
- Darius N. Couch (1822–1897), U.S. Army officer, naturalist, and Union army general in the American Civil War
- Samuel Leonard Crocker (1804–1883), politician; U.S. representative from Massachusetts 2nd District, 1853–1855
- Stephanie Cutter (born 1968), deputy senior advisor to President Barack Obama
- Richard De Wert (1931–1951), soldier (Korean War), Medal of Honor recipient; a guided missile frigate, the USS De Wert was named in honor of his heroics
- Eric DeCosta, executive vice president and general manager for the Baltimore Ravens (2003–present)
- William Z. Foster (1881–1961), Communist Party of the United States presidential candidate in 1924, 1928, and 1932; also party chairman 1945–1956
- Adam Gaudette (born 1996), professional ice hockey player
- Alan Gifford (1911–1989), actor
- Scott Hemond (born 1965), baseball player; former infielder for the Oakland Athletics
- James Leonard Hodges (1790–1846), politician; member of Massachusetts General Court; U.S. representative from Massachusetts 12th District, 1827–1833
- Leon Kamin (1927–2017), psychologist, co-authored the book Not in Our Genes (1974)
- William Standish Knowles (1917–2012), chemist, 2001 Nobel Prize laureate in Chemistry for his and his colleagues' work on chirally catalysed hydrogenation reactions
- Steven Laffoley (born 1965), author of creative-nonfiction and fiction works, including the award-winning Shadowboxing: the Rise and Fall of George Dixon (2012)
- Robert Milton Leach (1879–1952), politician; U.S. representative from Massachusetts 15th District, 1924–1925; alternate delegate to Republican National Convention from Massachusetts, 1928
- Emily Levesque, assistant professor in Astronomy at University of Washington
- William Croad Lovering (1835–1910), politician; member of Massachusetts Senate, 1874–1875; delegate to Republican National Convention from Massachusetts, 1880; U.S. representative from Massachusetts, 1897–1910 (12th District 1897–1903, 14th District 1903–1910); died in office in 1910
- Frank G. Mahady, Vermont attorney and judge who served on the Vermont Supreme Court
- William Mason (1808–1883), engine builder; machinist; manufacturer of locomotives and cotton machinery; pioneer in the building of locomotives; patented the "self-acting mule" and "Mason's Self-acting Mule," founder of the Mason Machine Works in 1873; built engine that carried Abraham Lincoln to his grave
- Joseph R. N. Maxwell, Jesuit priest and academic, president of the College of the Holy Cross and Boston College
- Barry McCaffrey (born 1942), military officer, politician, youngest 4-star general in the army at any time, director of the Office of National Drug Control Policy (ONDCP) under President Bill Clinton (1996–2001), drug czar
- Catherine Anna McKenna (1875–?), lawyer; first woman admitted to practice law in California
- Toby Morse (born 1970), musician; lead singer of hardcore punk band H_{2}O
- Marcus Morton (1784–1864), lawyer, jurist, politician, U.S. House member (Massachusetts), governor of Massachusetts (two terms)
- Joseph P. Murphy, politician; delegate to the Democratic National Convention from Massachusetts, 1936; presumed deceased
- Gordon O'Brien (c. 1947–2008), career criminal; associate of the Providence-based Patriarca crime family; involved in the failed kidnapping of bookmaker Blaise Marfeo in 1990
- Basil O'Connor (1892–1972), lawyer and aide of Franklin D. Roosevelt; president of the American Red Cross; chairman of the International Red Cross and Red Crescent Movement
- Marc R. Pacheco, politician; presidential elector for Massachusetts, 1996; delegate to Democratic National Convention from Massachusetts, 2000, 2004
- Edward Padelford (1799–1870), businessman, Confederate officer in the Civil War
- Seth Padelford (1807–1878), politician; lieutenant governor of Rhode Island, 1863–1865; presidential elector for Rhode Island, 1868; governor of Rhode Island, 1869–1873

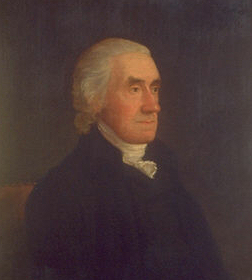
Robert Treat Paine, signer of the Declaration of Independence

- Robert Treat Paine (1731–1814), politician; Supreme Court judge of Massachusetts (1796–1804); signer of the Declaration of Independence
- John F. Parker, mayor of Taunton, 1953
- Emily Elizabeth Parsons, writer; Civil War nurse; founder of Mt. Auburn Hospital in Massachusetts
- Nicholas Pedro, contestant on Season 6 of American Idol
- Elizabeth Poole (1588–1654), English Puritan, foundress of the present-day city of Taunton, the first woman to have founded a town in the Americas in 1637
- John "Beans" Reardon (1897–1984), film actor, Major League Baseball umpire, officiated in five World Series games
- Corelli C. W. Simpson (1837–?), poet, cookbook author, painter
- Sterry Robinson Waterman (1901–1984), lawyer; delegate to Republican National Convention from Vermont, 1936; judge of U.S. Court of Appeals for the 2nd Circuit, 1955–1970; member of American Bar Association and American Judicature Society
- Louis G. Whitcomb (1903–1984), United States attorney for Vermont
- Colton Fagan (2003-): Fagan Family Heir, John F. Parker course record holder, Taunton long drive champion, 2019 Taunton High School Baseball Division 1 champion
