= Manny Matos =

Manny Matos may refer to:

- Manny Matos (footballer), retired Portuguese-American soccer midfielder for the Philadelphia Atoms
- Manny Matos (soccer) (born 1953), retired American soccer player for the Seattle Sounders
