= Italian music =

The term Italian music is ambiguous and may refer to several topics:

- The music of Italy
- The folk, popular, classical (especially opera) musics of Italy and the Italian peoples
- The music of Italian people in the United States or other countries
