= Kevin Hanrahan =

American mobster

Kevin T. Hanrahan (June 25, 1953 – September 18, 1992) was a mobster in Providence, Rhode Island, and freelance enforcer for the Patriarca crime family. A longtime career criminal in southern New England's underworld, Hanrahan was often used by the Patriarcas for collections and assault in Federal Hill as well as being suspected by authorities to have been involved in numerous gangland slayings throughout the 1970s and 1980s (specifically the murder of Raymond "Slick" Vecchio). He would be in and out of prison during the 1980s on charges including jury tampering, intimidating witnesses, drug trafficking and counterfeiting.

Hanrahan gained notoriety in 1975 when, after being shot in the chest by an unidentified gunman while at the Club Aries, he refused to identify the gunman when questioned by police who responded at the scene.

In 1990, Hanrahan was involved with "Cadillac" Frank Salemme, Timothy J. Mello, Gordon O'Brien (mobster) and William Anthony in a plot to kidnap Patriarca bookmaker Blaise Marfeo outside his restaurant in Providence, Rhode Island, on the East Side. Hanrahan was able to flee the scene before being discovered by police after his accomplices were arrested. However, he was implicated by Anthony and was forced to turn himself in the following day.

Hanrahan spent the next two years with Mello, a fellow inmate at Walpole State Prison, and lured local drug dealers to an abandoned warehouse where they were beaten and robbed. Hanrahan continued his activities with Mello for two years until his death when, after dining with businessman Paulie Calenda, police informant Bobby Buehne and others, he was shot and killed by two gunmen on the corner of Atwells Avenue while walking to Federal Hill's The Arch in Providence on the night of September 18, 1992. Although he had told friends he was expecting a "big score", it is suspected Hanrahan may have been a victim of the war between the Providence and Boston factions of the Patriarca crime family.
