= Carrico =

Carrico is a surname. Notable people with the surname include:

- Charles William Carrico Sr. (born 1961), American politician
- Dale Carrico, American rhetorician
- Daniel Carriço (born 1988), Portuguese footballer
- David Carrico, contributing author to the 1632 series of alternate history novels
- Harry L. Carrico (1916–2013), American jurist
- Joseph E. Carrico (c. 1925 - November 3, 1988), American management consultant and tennis official
- Marcellus Washington Carrico, founder of the El Paso Times newspaper
- Mother Mary Paul Carrico, first president of Mount St. Clare College, now Ashford University
- Reid Carrico (born 2002), American football player
- William "Bill" N. Carrico Jr., an entrepreneur and computer scientist from California
- Carriço (footballer) (born 1943), Portuguese footballer
