= Sessility (motility) =

Property of animals that do not use self-locomotion

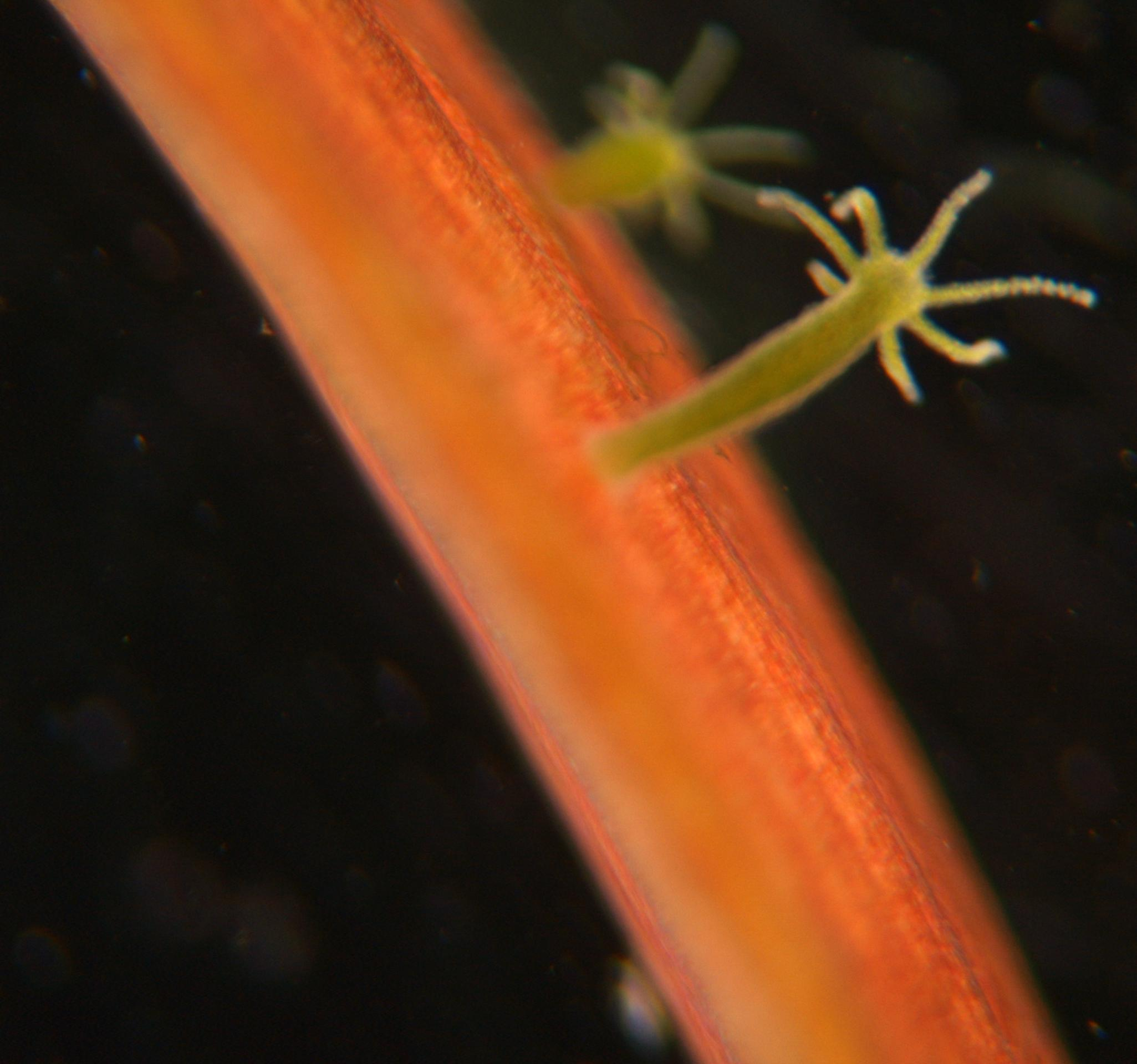
Generally sessile Hydra attached to a substrate

Sessility, a property of certain animals, is a lack of self-locomotion. Sessile animals do not have natural motility, and are immobile unless there are external forces (such as water currents). Usually, sessile animals are permanently attached to a solid object, such as a rock, a dead tree trunk, or a human-made object such as a buoy or ship's hull. Organisms such as corals lay down their own substrate from which they grow.

Biological sessility differs from the botanical concept of sessility, which refers to an organism or biological structure attached directly by its base without a stalk.

== Mobility ==
Sessile animals typically have a motile phase in their development. Sponges have a motile larval stage and become sessile at maturity. Conversely, many jellyfish develop as sessile polyps early in their life cycle. In the case of the cochineal, it is in the nymph stage (also called the crawler stage) that the cochineal disperses. The juveniles move to a feeding spot and produce long wax filaments. Later they move to the edge of the cactus pad where the wind catches the wax filaments and carries the tiny larval cochineals to a new host.

== Reproduction ==
Many sessile animals, including sponges, corals and hydra, are capable of asexual reproduction in situ by the process of budding. Sessile organisms such as barnacles and tunicates need some mechanism to move their young into new territory. This is why the most widely accepted theory explaining the evolution of a larval stage is the need for long-distance dispersal ability. Biologist Wayne Sousa's 1979 study in intertidal disturbance added support for the theory of nonequilibrium community structure, "suggesting that open space is necessary for the maintenance of diversity in most communities of sessile organisms".

== Clumping ==
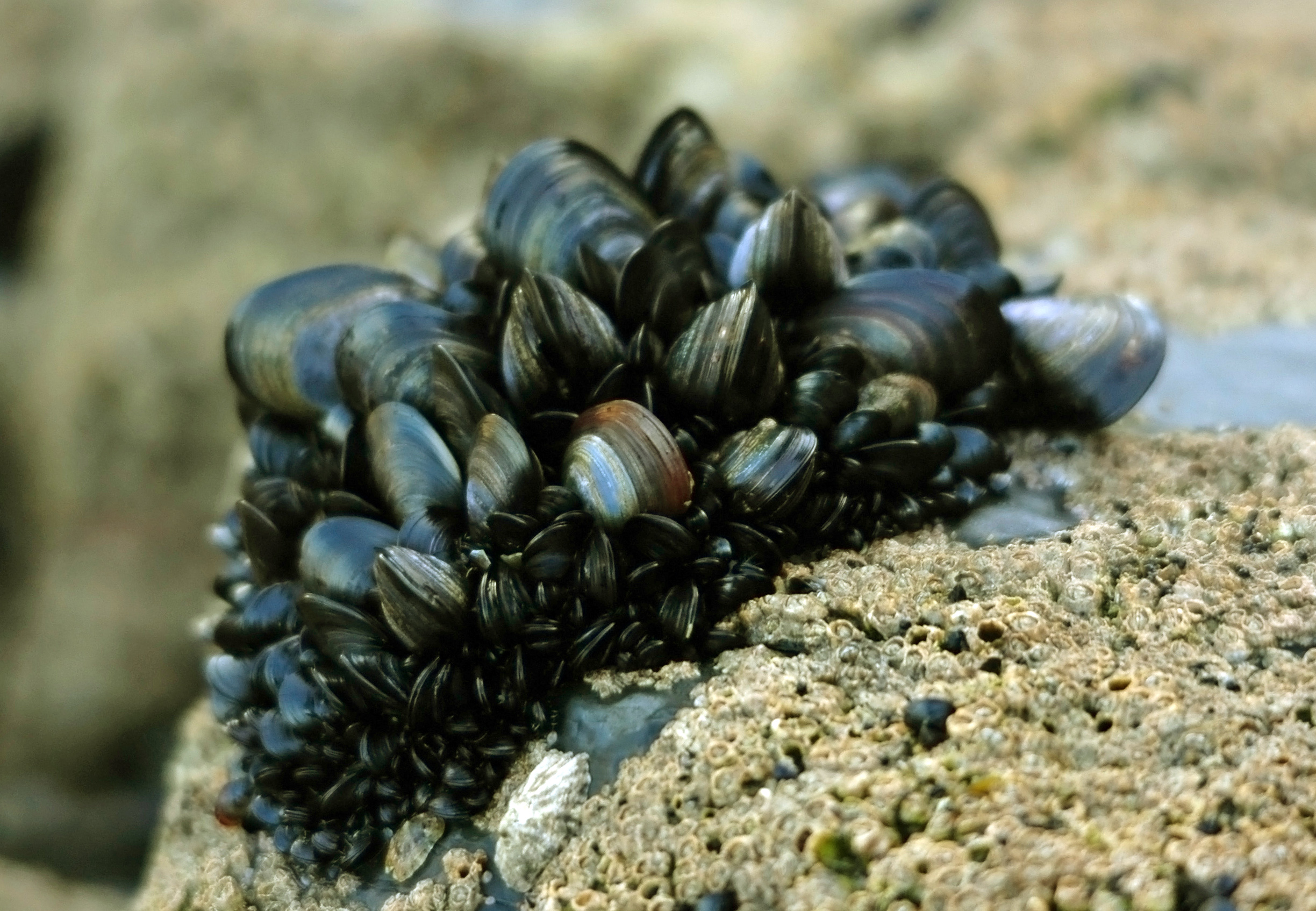
Blue mussels, Mytilus edulis, are sessile and exhibit clumping

Clumping is a behavior in sessile organisms in which individuals of a particular species group closely to one another for beneficial purposes, as can be seen in coral reefs and cochineal populations. This allows for faster reproduction and better protection from predators.

== Predominance in coastal environments ==
The circalittoral zone of coastal environments and biomes are dominated by sessile organisms such as oysters. Carbonate platforms grow due to the buildup of skeletal remains of sessile organisms, usually microorganisms, which induce carbonate precipitation through their metabolism.

== Botanical sessility ==
In anatomy and botany, sessility refers to an organism or biological structure that has no peduncle or stalk. A sessile structure has no stalk.

See: peduncle (anatomy), peduncle (botany) and sessility (botany).

== See also ==
- Anthozoa
- Ediacara biota
