= George Mendes =

- Education: Culinary Institute of America, Hyde Park, New York.
- Culinary career
- Cooking style: Portuguese
- Rating: Michelin stars
- Current restaurant: Aldea
- Previous restaurants: Martin Berasategui; La Bastide de Moustiers; Le Moulin de Mougins; Lespinasse; L'Arpege; Le Zoo; Bouley (1992-1996)
- Website: aldearestaurant.com

George Mendes was the executive chef of Aldea, a defunct Michelin-starred restaurant in New York City.

== Career ==
Mendes was raised in Danbury, Connecticut. He graduated from the Culinary Institute of America in 1992, and later worked at Bouley under the instruction of chef David Bouley. He subsequently trained under Alain Passard at L'Arpege in Paris.

In 1996, Mendes was recruited by Bouley to become the executive chef of Le Zoo. In 1998, he began working under chef Sandro Gamba at Lespinasse in Washington, D.C. where he learned how to create the restaurant's "French luxe cuisine".

In 2016, he was featured on the Our Portuguese Table hosted by Angela Simões and Maria Lawton.

== See also ==
- List of Michelin-starred restaurants
