= David Leite =

Portuguese-American writer

- Born: David Joseph Leite; July 18, 1960 (age 66); Fall River, Massachusetts, U.S.
- Citizenship: United States and Portugal
- Occupations: writer, memoirist, web publisher
- Years active: 1999–present
- Notable work: The New Portuguese Table: Exciting Flavors from Europe's Western Coast; Notes on a Banana: A Memoir of Food Love and Manic Depression
- Partner: Alan Dunkelberger "The One" (1993—present)
- Website: Official website

David Joseph Leite (born 18 July 1960) is a Portuguese American food writer, cookbook author, memoirist, and founder of the two-time James Beard Award-winning website Leite's Culinaria.

== Early life ==
Leite was born in Fall River, Massachusetts, and raised in Swansea, where he graduated from Joseph Case High School in 1978 and Hunter College in 1997.

== Career ==
He has written for The New York Times, Martha Stewart Living Bon Appétit, Saveur, Food & Wine, Gourmet, Food Arts, Men's Health, The Los Angeles Times Magazine, Chicago Sun Times, The Washington Post, and other publications in the United States and abroad. Leite won the 2008 James Beard Award for Best Newspaper Feature Without Recipes. He also won the 2006 and 2007 James Beard Award for Best Internet Website for Food. Leite is a four-time nominee for the Bert Greene Award for Food Journalism, which he won in 2006. He is also a recipient of several awards from the Association of Food Journalists. His work has been featured in Best Food Writing (ISBN 1-56924-416-2) 14 times since 2001. Leite was a contributor to The Morning News. He was also a recurring guest on the Today Show, the Martha Stewart Radio program Living Today hosted by Mario Bosquez, and Connecticut Style. He has been heard on Good Food with Evan Kleiman, Lucinda Scala Quinn's program, Mad Hungry Monday and various NPR programs. Leite has appeared on History Channel 2's United Stuff of America and Food Network's Beat Bobby Flay. He reads his essays and columns, as well as acts as a correspondent, on public radio's food program The Splendid Table hosted by Lynne Rossetto Kasper. In 2012 he served a guest host of Cooking Today on Martha Stewart Radio. In 2013 he began broadcasting the popular podcast Talking With My Mouth Full. In August 2009 his first book, The New Portuguese Table: Exciting Flavors From Europe's Western Coast, was published by Clarkson Potter and won the 2010 First Book/Julia Child Award. A humorist, Leite brings a skewed and funny sensibility to the world of food.

In 2016, he was featured on the "Our Portuguese Table" podcast hosted by Angela Simões and Maria Lawton.

Notes on a Banana: A Memoir of Food, Love, and Manic Depression, Leite's second book, was published on April 11, 2017, by Dey Street Books, a division of HarperCollins.

== Awards ==
- Association of Food Journalists Awards
- Awards Beard James
- Bert Greene Awards
- Culinary Hall of Fame Induction
- IACP/Julia Child Award for Best First Book

== Bibliography ==
- Notes on a Banana: A Memoir of Food, Love, and Manic Depression. Dey Street Books: 2017.
- The New Portuguese Table: Exciting Flavors From Europe's Western Coast. Clarkson Potter: 2009.
