= Millicent Borges Accardi =

Portuguese-American poet

Millicent Borges Accardi is a Portuguese-American poet who lives in California. She has received literary fellowships from the National Endowment for the Arts (NEA), Fulbright, CantoMundo, the California Arts Council, Foundation for Contemporary Arts, Barbara Deming Foundation, and Formby Special Collections at Texas Tech University. She is also a recent recipient for the Helen Degen Cohen Summer Reading Fellowship at RHINO_Poetry

== Biography ==
Accardi received degrees in English and literature from California State University, Long Beach (CSULB), holds a master's in professional writing from the University of Southern California (USC). She also studied at the Vermont College of Fine Arts in 1993.

Her book, Through a Grainy Landscape, a collection of poetry based on contemporary Portuguese literature is with New Meridian Arts, 2021. Other poetry collections include QUarantine Highway, (FlowerSong Press), Only More So, (Salmon Poetry, Ireland), Injuring Eternity with World Nouveau She has a chapbook, Woman on a Shaky Bridge, with Finishing Line Press.

Her articles can be found at The American Poetry Review, Association of Writers & Writing Programs, and Another Chicago Magazine. Interview subjects have included Grammy Director Michael Greene; poets Dana Goia, W.S. Merwin, Rachel Eliza Griffiths and Carl Dennis; writers Frank X. Gaspar, Sam Pereira, Jacinto Lucas Pires, Donna Freitas (Sex and the Soul), and Nuno Júdice; Paulette Rapp (daughter of The Bickersons writer), Stephen Rebello (Alfred Hitchcock and the Making of Psycho), playwright Bill Bozzone, CantoMundo founders, and Portuguese-American scholar Deolinda Adão.

Accardi's work has appeared in over 150 publications, including The Paris Review, 'Nimrod, Tampa Review, New Letters and The Wallace Stevens Journal, as well as in Boomer Girls (Iowa Press) and The Experiment Will Not Be Bound: An Anthology, Peter Campion, ed. (Unbound 2023) anthologies. Artist residencies include Yaddo, Jentel, Vermont Studio, Fundación Valparaíso in Mojacar, Milkwood in Český Krumlov, CZ and Disquiet in Lisbon, Portugal.

== Reading series ==
In 2012, Accardi started the "Kale Soup for the Soul" for the reading series featuring Portuguese-American writers. The first edition was in Chicago at the Chicago Cultural Center. Since then, "Kale Soup for the Soul" readings have featured over 25 different writers, in regional readings in cities such as San Francisco, Seattle, Iowa City, Providence, Rhode Island, Boston and San José—as part of a new wave of Portuguese-American Literature. In 2013, there were "Kale Soup for the Soul" readings at the Mass Poetry Festival in Salem, the Valente Library in Cambridge, and the Portuguese Consulate in Boston.

== Works ==
Poetry collections:

- Quarantine Highway (FlowerSong Press 2022)
- Through a Grainy Landscape (New Meridian Arts Press, 2021)
- Only More So (Salmon Poetry, 2016)
- Injuring Eternity (Mischievous Muse Press, December, 2010)

Chapbooks:

- Woman on a Shaky Bridge (Finishing Line Press, 2010)

== Awards 2015: Fulbright Fellowship for Poetry ==
Source:
