= Music of immigrant communities in the United States =

The vast majority of the inhabitants of the United States are immigrants or descendants of immigrants. This article will focus on the music of these communities and discuss its roots in countries across Africa, Europe and Asia, excluding only Native American music, indigenous and immigrant Latinos, Puerto Rican music, Hawaiian music and African American music. The music of Irish- and Scottish-Americans will be a special focus, due to their extreme influence on Appalachian folk music and other genres. These sorts of music are often sustained and promoted by a variety of ethnic organizations.

== Armenia ==
See: Music of Armenia

Following the Armenian genocide of 1915 perpetrated by the Young Turk government in Turkey, large numbers of Armenians settled in the Central Valley area of California, especially around Fresno. Of the second- and third-generation musicians from this community, Richard Hagopian became a minor star in the Armenian-American community. Alan Hovhaness used traditional Armenian music in his compositions. Daja Yavasharian is a solo violinist who performs classical music.

The ethnically Armenian heavy metal band System of a Down features Armenian melodic elements in many of their songs and has written songs dedicated to the Armenian genocide. The group is very active in promoting genocide awareness and recognition.

== Cape Verde ==
See: Music of Cape Verde

There are more Cape Verdeans outside of their homeland than there are in the island chain itself. In the United States, California and Hawaii are home to large Cape Verdean populations, but the largest concentration is in New England, especially Rhode Island and Southeastern Massachusetts. Many of these immigrants came via whaling ships in the 19th century. Cape Verdean music is most famously morna, but other genres exist and the Cape Verdean community has produced string bands like The B-29s, Notias, Augusto Abrio and the Cape Verdean Serenaders. There were also Cape Verdean big bands, including the Creole Vagabonds and the Don Verdi Orchestra. More modern musicians include Frank de Pina, Mendes Brothers (and their influential record label, MB Records), Saozinha, Creole Sextet and Rui Pina.

== China ==
See: Music of China

Chinese-American bands include Say Bok Gwai . The pop-rapper Jin has lately gained some national renown as well. The electronic group Shanghai Restoration Project has been rising through the charts in online downloadable music stores.

== Czech lands ==
See: Music of the Czech Republic

Though associated with Slovenia, Germany and Poland as well, the Czech Republic includes Bohemia, the ancestral home of polka music. Polka has a long history in the United States, and the city of Chicago, among others, had produced numerous innovations in the genre.

== Eastern European Jews ==
See: Jewish music, Eastern European music, Secular Jewish culture

Early in the 20th century, Eastern European immigrants settled across the United States. Many were Ashkenazi Jews, who brought with them their swift, eminently dance-able klezmer music. Harry Kandel, a clarinetist, stood out in the field, alongside Abe Schwartz, Naftule Brandwein and Dave Tarras.

Later, in the 1980s, a new generation of klezmer roots revivalists made innovative fusions of klezmer with punk rock and other influences. These bands include the Flying Klezmer Bulgar Band and The Klezmatics.

== England ==
As the homeland of many of the settlers of the original Thirteen Colonies, and a major source of immigration thereafter, England's musical traditions are closely tied to those of the United States, especially Appalachian folk music. In the 1850s, there was a thriving brass band tradition in the United States, drawing on British bands formed around factory workers.

== France ==
See: Music of France

The most well-known kind of French music in the United States is that of the Cajuns of Louisiana. Cajun and Creole music has spawned many popular artists in the zydeco genre, including Clifton Chenier.

== Germany ==
See: Music of Germany

German immigrants brought with them a variety of music, waltzes, polkas and oom-pah bands among them. A German musical society of the mid-19th century formed the Seventh Regiment Band, the only exclusively regimental band of the Civil War-era and one of the most popular brass bands of the time. German bandleader Friendrich Wilhelm Wieprecht was also influential, collecting full scores for his compilation of instrumentations of popular works, für die jetzige Stimmenbesetzung. Instruments included the bassoon, contrabassoon, bass tuba, trumpet, trombone, clarinet, piccolo, oboe, French horn, saxhorn, drums and cymbal. Wieprecht was recognized at the time as a key figure in the reorganization of the Prussian military bands.

The music of the Amish, a religious community descended from German and Swiss settlers who eschew modern technology in favor of simplicity, is entirely religious, and is sung in a style that has not been widely performed in Europe for centuries.

The songs of the Pennsylvania German culture, a mixture of British, South German and other elements, are primarily German, with many based on British tunes. Pennsylvania spirituals are a well-known kind of folk hymn, most of which date to the early 19th century.

== Greece ==
See: Music of Greece and Greek folk music

Greek-American immigrant music includes styles of Greek music such as Ancient, traditional, with emphasis in Greek literature and poetry.

Some of the well-known Greek supporters and remarkable personalities of Greek immigrant music art in America are: Stamatis Spanoudakis, Nana Mouskouri, Maria Farantouri, Marinella, Yanni, Mikis Theodorakis, Vicky Leandros etc. and remarkable composers and pianists such as Manos Loïzos and Stefanos Korkolis. Until the 1930s the Greek discography was separated by two musical genres: the Greek folk music and the Elafró tragoudi (literally: "light song"). The latter was made by ensembles of singers/musicians or solo artists like Attik and Nikos Gounaris. It was the Greek version of the international popular music of that era. In the 1930s the first rebetiko recordings had a massive impact on Greek music in America. The tradition of eastern liturgical chant, encompassing the Greek-speaking world, developed in the Byzantine Empire from the establishment of its capital, Constantinople.

A big sign of the Greek immigrant music culture has left the Greek soprano Maria Kallas. Immigrant Greek music also includes music from Greek islands the Nisiotika and the famous dance Sirtaki with well-known artists like Yiannis Parios etc.

Greek music history extends far back into ancient Greece, since music was a major part of ancient Greek theater. Music genres and styles like Laïko, Hasapiko and rebetiko are also well-known. Performers include Johnny Otis and Tatiana Troyanos. Classic laïkó as it is known today, was the mainstream popular music of Greece during the 1960s and 1970s. Laïkó was dominated by singers such as Tolis Voskopoulos and Stelios Kazantzidis.

Among the most significant songwriters and lyricists of this period are George Zambetas and the big names of the Rebetiko era that where still in business, like Vassilis Tsitsanis and Manolis Chiotis. Many artists combined the traditions of éntekhno and laïkó with considerable success, such as the composers Stavros Xarchakos and Mimis Plessas.

The Pontic genre of immigrant music which is well-known from the remarkable minority of Pontians in America, retains elements of the musical traditions of ancient Greece, Byzantine music and the tradition of Caucasus. The prime instruments in Pontic music are the Pontic lyra (Kemenche), which has origins in Byzantine period and it is related closely with the Byzantine lyra and Cretan lyra. Other instruments include drums, lute, askomandoura (a type of bagpipe) and aulos.

Cretan music uses the dominant folk instrument Cretan lyra on the island as the result of immigrant music; a three-stringed bowed instrument similar to the Byzantine Lyra. It is often accompanied by the askomandoura (a type of bagpipe) and the Cretan laouto (λαούτο). The earliest documented music on Crete comes from Ancient Greece. Cretan music like most traditional Greek, began as product of ancient and Byzantine inspirations.

== India ==
The Indian diaspora (and significant portion of other South Asian diaspora) enjoy Indian music, which includes Indian classical music and non-classical Indian music. The non-classical music has at least two categories: film music (original sound tracks) and non-film music (often called Indi-pop). The Bollywood music represents Hindi language film songs. Indian diaspora speaking non-Hindi languages enjoy music of their own languages, such as Tamil music, Bengali music, Punjabi music and so on. Fusion between popular Indian music (such as Bollywood or Bhangra music) and American music has taken place, and is popular in certain areas with high Indian American population density.

== Iran ==
See: Music of Iran or Persian Music

After the 1979 revolution, the new Iranian government banned all pop music and many other genres. Numerous Iranians, including musicians, entered into exile, many settling in the Los Angeles-area. The Iranian-American scene produced several stars in the Iranian-in-exile community, including Dariush, Ebi, Homeira, Hayedeh, Mahasti, Moein and more.

There are also many newcomers in Persian/Iranian Music who have made huge impression. Below are a list of them:

Andy Madadian, Mansour, Leila Forouhar, Shahrzad Sepanlou, Arash, Shadmehr Aghili, Jamshid, Cameron Cartio, Muhammad, Kamran & Hooman, Fereydoun, Hi-5, Shaghayegh, Shahriar and much more

== Ireland ==
Celtic music
Asturias
Brittany
Cornwall
Galicia
Ireland
Isle of Man
Scotland
Wales
Celtic US
Celtic Canada

Joseph Halliday, a Dubliner, is notable for having introduced the keyed bugle in 1810. While not a technical innovation (the keyed trumpet was already known), it did become extremely popular in the burgeoning brass band tradition and inspired a whole family of instruments, the ophicleides. In the middle of the 19th century, Irish bandleader Patrick Sarsfield Gilmore was very influential, having introduced a wide range of reed instruments as well as developing instrumentation that allowed a large wind ensemble to approximate the effects of a full orchestra.

The 1960s saw the Clancy Brothers (with Tommy Makem) become minor celebrities in the United States, especially in the Irish-American community. They appeared at Carnegie Hall and on The Ed Sullivan Show. Mick Moloney’s Irish-American Music and Dance Festival has existed for over twenty years and remains an important part of the Irish-American scene.

In the eighties several high-profile Irish artists emigrated to the US, including Mary Black, Dolores Keane and Maura O'Connell. At the same time groups sprang up in America to play Irish music at a professional level. Mick Moloney founded Green Fields of America in 1977 to bring together immigrant Irish and native-born players of Irish music. Although they did not record an album until 1989, they created a ripple. The band contained several people who went on achieve international fame – Seamus Egan, Eileen Ivers and Jerry O'Sullivan. Another early Irish-American band was Cherish the Ladies formed in 1985.

The rules of the All-Ireland championships allow non Irish residents to complete and thanks to Irish cultural centres in New York and Chicago, young US citizens began to win in dancing and fiddling. Chicago-born Liz Carroll came second in 1974 with her fiddling. In 1992 she was a member of Trian, who recorded two highly regarded albums of strictly traditional no-frills Irish instrumentals. Some films gave exposure to Irish music – "Barry Lyndon" (1975 – The Chieftains), "The Brothers McMullen" (1984 – Seamus Egan), "Dancing at Lughnasa" (1998 – Arty McGlynn) and "Titanic" (1997). The touring stage show "Riverdance" (1995) was probably the biggest single publicity blaze in the cause of Irish-American music. The New York "Kips Bay Ceilidh Band" recorded an admired album of dance tunes (1993).

Celtic new age music from Clannad (Ireland), harpist Loreena McKennitt (Canada) and Nightnoise (Ireland) were popular in a low-key way in the US. Tríona and Mícheál O Dhomhnaill from Nightnoise had emigrated to the US in the 70s and started recording in 1984. There were pop hits for Enya (originally from Clannad). Among the immigrants from Ireland was Susan McKeown. She had been recording since 1990 but won international praise for "Lowlands" (2000). In 1996 the Irish-American supergroup Solas was formed. The group contained multi-instrumentalist Seamus Egan and a powerful new singer Karan Casey. The Chieftains had been visiting America since the 70s but by 2003 the audience was big enough to justify a DVD, live from Nashville.

== Italy ==
See: Music of Italy

Italian-Americans are concentrated on the Eastern Seaboard, especially in New York City. Their music includes square dances, tarantellas, mazurkas, waltzes and polkas, and music for mandolin, banjo, guitar and accordion.

Italian folk traditions have had a lasting influence of barbershop singing and doo wop. Neapolitan bandleader Francis Scala was bandleader of the U.S. Marine Band after immigrating in 1840; as is common in Naples, he placed the clarinet (which he played himself) in a prominent place in his performances.

== Jamaica ==
See: Music of Jamaica

Undoubtedly the most influential Jamaican-American entertainer is DJ Kool Herc, who is often credited as the inventor of hip hop. He immigrated to New York City and brought with him the roots of hip hop—a DJ isolating and repeating a percussion break while an MC spoke over the beats.

Second generation Jamaican Busta Rhymes was later an important gangsta rapper during the 1990s; his style is similar to that found in Jamaican dub, dancehall and reggaeton.

For more information about Caribbean cultural influence in the United States, see Holger Henke's, The West Indian Americans, Westport: Greenwood Press 2001.

== Japan ==
Large-scale Japanese immigration to the United States began early in the 20th century, and traditional music came with them. California and Hawaii were two of the biggest destinations for these immigrants. The first North American taiko group was Seiichi Tanaka's San Francisco Taiko Dojo in San Francisco, which was founded in 1968.

== Norway ==
Norwegian-American folk music in the United States is mostly found in Minnesota and surrounding states. Reinlenders, polkas and waltzes are played; of these, waltzes are by far the most common . Instruments include the psalmodikon, fiddle and accordion. Celebrations like Syttende Mai have become an important outlet for traditional Norwegian music.

== Pakistan ==
Pakistani music in the United States is largely influenced by homegrown Pakistani American musicians and bands. The Kominas are an American-Pakistani taqwacore band from Boston. There have been a number of successful American musicians of Pakistani origin; they include Nadia Ali, rappers Bohemia and Mr. Capone-E, Junoon member Salman Ahmad, the Qaiyum brothers (MCs GQ and JAQ), as well as Explosions in the Sky guitarist Munaf Rayani. Much of the works contributed by Pakistani musicians in the U.S. are often inspired by a fusion of contemporary and traditional American and Pakistani musical genres.

== Philippines ==
See: Music of the Philippines and Filipino American music

There is an organization that gives out Filipino American Music Entertainment Awards.

External links:

- Filipino-American music in Los Angeles archive

== Poland ==
While Polish folk music still exists in its "old country" form, the most prevalent form of music evolved from traditional polkas, obereks, waltzes and Krakowiaks into what is common among the community today. This music form was pioneered by such musicians as Bernie Witkowski, Frank Wojnarowski, AmPol Aires, and Eddie Ziema. Royal Polish music, such as the polonaise (polonez), and folk music, mazur, oberek, krakowiak, kujawiak, and regional music, are celebrated by various Polish folk groups around the country.

The Polish community is strongest in the area around Chicago, Illinois. Chicago's Orkiestra Makowska, led by George Dzialowy, defined that city's unique sound for many years.

The city's Polish-American community spawned a wave of musicians that are usually considered polka players, though their actual output is quite varied. Chicago-style polka music has a distinctive sound from that found in other parts of the country. New England, Buffalo, NY, Detroit, Pittsburgh and Minneapolis also have Polish-American musical traditions and each has its own distinctive sound.

More than 50,000 Polish-Americans live in the area around Houston, Texas. There is a rich tradition of Polish fiddling from Texas that had declined into obscurity until a recent revitalization by performers like Brian Marshall. Polish settlers arrived beginning in the middle of the 19th century, settling in Panna Maria, a village just south of San Antonio. A few decades later, a new wave of Polish migrants settled in Chappell Hill, Stoneham, Brenham, Bremond, Anderson, Carlos and New Waverly. These people's folk music consisted of bowed bass, fiddle and sometimes a clarinet, with the later additions of drums, accordions and guitars. Within Texas, Polish music was diverse, with a rhythmic style predominant in the Chappell Hill/Brenham area, and a melodic sound in Bremond. The group, Brave Combo is an example of what is commonly called within the industry Tex-Mex polka music. The Czech and Polish settlers in Texas had a major influence on the traditional Mexican folk music forming what we now know as Tejano music.

== Portugal ==
See: Music of Portugal In the United States there are Portuguese American singers and bands known such as Jorge Ferreira, Arlindo Andrade, Marc Dennis, Jack Sebastião (R.I.P.), Nélia, Sergio Royal, Mauricio Morais, Alcides Machado, Chico Avila, Luis Fontes Sousa José Norberto, Ana Lisa, Nelson, Michelle Romeiro, José Lobo, Jorge Pereira and Eratoxica. also perform world music, rock, dance or pimba music. Fado is also popular in the U.S., and there, Ramana Vieira is one of the representers of this music genre. Portuguese American musicians are usually based in New England, New Jersey and California. Nowadays, about 5,000 000 Portuguese Americans live in the United States. The majority of them comes from Madeira and Azores Islands.

== Serbia and Montenegro ==
See: Music of Serbia and Montenegro

There is a Serbian rock scene in the Greater Cleveland area.

== Slovenia ==
See: Music of Slovenia

Slovenian-American polka musician Frankie Yankovic is by far the most famous musician of that genre. He began his career in the 1930s, beginning with some regional hits in the Detroit and Cleveland areas, followed by mainstream success in the later 1940s.

== Ukraine ==
See: Music of Ukraine

Ukrainian-Americans in the Cleveland and Detroit area have kept a folk scene alive, also producing a minor crossover star in the 1920s and 30s, Pawlo Humeniuk, the King of the Ukrainian Fiddlers.

Recently, the Ukrainian immigrant band Gogol Bordello have emerged into the mainstream.

== Uruguay ==
The list of many crossover musicians also includes classical three-time Grammy nominated composer Miguel del Aguila see: Music of Uruguay

== Vietnam ==
See: Music of Vietnam

There is a Vietnamese American Philharmonic orchestra. Popular musicians in the Vietnamese-American community include Thanh Lan.
