= Gordon O'Brien =

Gordon O'Brien (c. 1947–2008) was a Taunton mobster and associate for the Patriarca crime family. Long a presence in southern New England's underworld, O'Brien had extensive contacts with the Patriarcas in Federal Hill and, with Kevin Hanrahan, helped Fall River mobster Timothy J. Mello make connections with the Patriarcas. As early as 1990, O'Brien was under surveillance by federal agents where he was observed with Mello at a 1990 meeting with "Cadillac" Frank Salemme regarding illegal gambling.

In August 1990, O'Brien was arrested with Salemme, Mello and freelance contract killer William Anthony in a plot to kidnap Patriarca bookmaker Blaise Marfeo outside his restaurant, Adesso, on the East Side of Providence, Rhode Island.

In April 1991, Taunton Police raided the apartment of professional gambler Howard J. Ferrini whom Bristol County authorities believed had been hiding O'Brien. However, while Ferrini was taken into custody, police failed to find evidence O'Brien had been living there.

O'Brien was serving a state prison sentence for smuggling heroin to Martha's Vineyard until he was granted parole in 2008. He died several months after being released.
