= Catherine Anna McKenna =

American lawyer

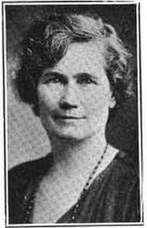
Catherine Anna McKenna

Catherine Anna McKenna (August 30, 1875 – 6 August 1967) was a US lawyer. In 1912, she was the first woman to be admitted to practice law in California since the passage of the suffrage amendment. She also served on the Supreme Court of California, Supreme Court of Wyoming, and the District Court of the United States.

== Early years and education ==
Catherine Anna Hickey was born in Taunton, Massachusetts in 1875. She was the daughter of James and Hannah (Mahoney) Hickey. She attended public schools in Colorado, and graduated from State Normal School at Greeley, Colorado, in 1896.

== Career ==
McKenna taught school for five years after her graduation. She resided in Colorado and Montana before coming to Los Angeles, California in 1902. She married John Irving McKenna in 1906. She studied law under J. Irving McKenna, and was admitted to the bar of California by the Supreme Court on January 17, 1912. McKenna, who specialized in land titles, maintained offices at 440 Wilcox Building, Los Angeles. She was a member of Woman's Lawyers Association, Woman Lawyers Club, Women's City Club, Professional Women's Club, Bar Association, National Woman's Party, as well as the Business and Professional Women's Association.
