= Joe Lopes =

Personal information
- Full name: Joseph Lopes
- Nickname: Lopes
- Born: October 28, 1964 San Leandro, California
- Died: March 24, 2002 (aged 37) Farmington, California

Sport
- Country: United States
- Sport: Skateboarding
- Event: Vert skateboarding
- Turned pro: 1983

Joe Lopes (October 28, 1964 - March 24, 2002) was an American professional skateboarder.

== Career ==
Lopes started skateboarding in the San Francisco Bay Area community of San Leandro in the late 1970s. He and his father Tony are credited with building one of the first half-pipes in their San Leandro backyard. Both professional and amateur skaters from around the world skated the ramp in Lopes' backyard, including a young Tony Hawk. Lopes was also the first pro to host a backyard pro jam-format contest in his backyard in 1983. During his professional career, Lopes was sponsored by Venture Trucks, Op clothing, Rector protective wear, and Schmitt Stix skateboards.

Lopes' barbecue graphics, designed by professional skateboarder Neil Blender, was considered to be one of the most popular skateboard graphics of the late 1980s.

== Death ==
In March 2002, Lopes was killed in an auto accident, leaving behind a wife and five children. A month after his death, a contest and barbecue (one of Joe's favorite activities) was held in his honor. Presented by Etnies footwear and Element Skateboards, thirty skaters entered the contest but first place was awarded to Joe Lopes. Between the fundraiser and the donations during the barbecue, the fundraiser raised $2200 for Lopes' family. Neil Heddings, who had won the contest, overheard former 411 Video Magazine founder Steve Douglas talking to a friend about how the winners should donate part of their winnings to the family. Heddings agreed, saying "That's a great idea!", and donated his entire winner's share to the fundraiser.

== Personal ==
Lopes enjoyed barbecuing and was quoted as saying "I don't want to enter that contest, but I will cook for anybody." He also enjoyed making anything out of wood, including cages for the snakes and tarantulas that he taught.

== See also ==
- List of sportspeople who died during their careers
