= Wayne Sousa =

Wayne P. Sousa
- Citizenship: American
- Education: University of California, Santa Barbara (Ph.D.)
- Known for: Disturbance in the Intertidal Community
- Awards: George Mercer Award (1981)
- Scientific career
- Fields: Integrative Biology (Community Ecology)
- Workplaces: University of California, Berkeley
- Doctoral advisor: Joseph Connell

Wayne Philip Sousa is a biologist and ecologist. He works at the University of California, Berkeley as a professor and chair of the Department of Integrative Biology. His research in community ecology has been in two broad areas: the role of disturbance in structuring natural communities and the ecology of host-parasite interactions. In his lab, students work alongside Sousa on research topics such as mangrove forest gap regeneration, the demographics of intertidal algae in California, plant invasions in coastal California grasslands, and rainforest seedlings in Ecuador.

== Intermediate Disturbance Theory: 1979 ==
=== Methods ===
For his dissertation he studied species diversity on intertidal boulders in Ellwood Beach, California. He organized his study by boulder size as well as frequency of being tumbled by the waves; boulders were put into groups of small, intermediate, and large depending on the force it would take a wave to move it. The study began in April 1975, and species richness was measured monthly on all three sizes of boulders, until May 1977.

The surf overturns boulders of all shapes and sizes, but smaller boulders are overturned at a more frequent rate, allowing less time for plants and animals to use them as a resource. From this information it appears that the larger boulder would have the greatest diversity, however Sousa found that this hypothesis was incorrect. Large boulders usually have less biota than intermediate sized boulders, because they are inundated with one species of red algae, it is only after winter that the algae defoliates when other organisms can inhabit the boulder.

Sousa discovered barnacles and Ulva, a fast succession species of green alga, inhabit the small boulders; these species essentially “took over” the resources of the boulder before any other organism had an opportunity. Intermediate boulders have the most varied communities, consisting numerous types of organisms; this study found barnacles, Ulva, quick succeeding red alga, and sometimes the late accumulating red alga, Gigartina canaliculata was also present. These areas are the best in terms of species survival. The large, infrequently moving boulders are covered with the Gigartina canaliculata; once this alga dominates the boulder other species get “kicked out” or cannot find space to live there.

=== Findings ===
The seasons did affect the variation of species type and dominance on the boulders. However, while time was an important factor it did not make the experiment's findings inconclusive. It is common for populations to go extinct than to remain stable in such a harsh environment, as an intertidal zone. But the study was conclusive and added support for the theory of nonequilibrium community structure, “suggesting that open space is necessary for the maintenance of diversity in most communities of sessile organisms.”

== Mangroves: 2003 ==
=== Methods ===
Since 2003, his research has focused on Caribbean mangrove forest dynamics. Because of coastal development, resource exploitation, pollution and other environmental hazards, mangrove forests are in danger of extinction worldwide. “In the Caribbean, the rate of mainland mangrove deforestation is 1.4–1.7% annually, comparable to rates for threatened tropical rainforests. The information Sousa and colleagues collect on natural patterns of mangrove regeneration is critical to management and conservation of these unique habitats.” He uses sampling techniques, as well as other various experiments, to discover the reason for spatial and temporal pattern differences seen in gaps in the arbor canopy. The process to potentially fill those gaps with vegetation is called regeneration.

One experiment, to discover why sapling mangroves were not succeeding, found that damage by insects at critical stages in development were the problem. He measured three common species of mangroves in Panama; these species showed an intraspecific variation of propagule size, and were disposed to attacks from larval insects. The insect predation did not focus on a single mangrove or propagule size, however the study found that larger propagules developed more rapidly, thus having a better chance at survival.

=== Findings ===
This study is important for understanding gap regenerations and the problems of such a task. “This experiment demonstrated that natural levels of variation in propagule size and predisposal damage by insects translate into significant difference in seedling performance in terms of establishment and early growth. Such differences are sufficiently large that they could influence the intensity and outcome of competitive interactions during forest regeneration.”
