= Mariano S. Bishop =

American labor organizer (1906–1953)

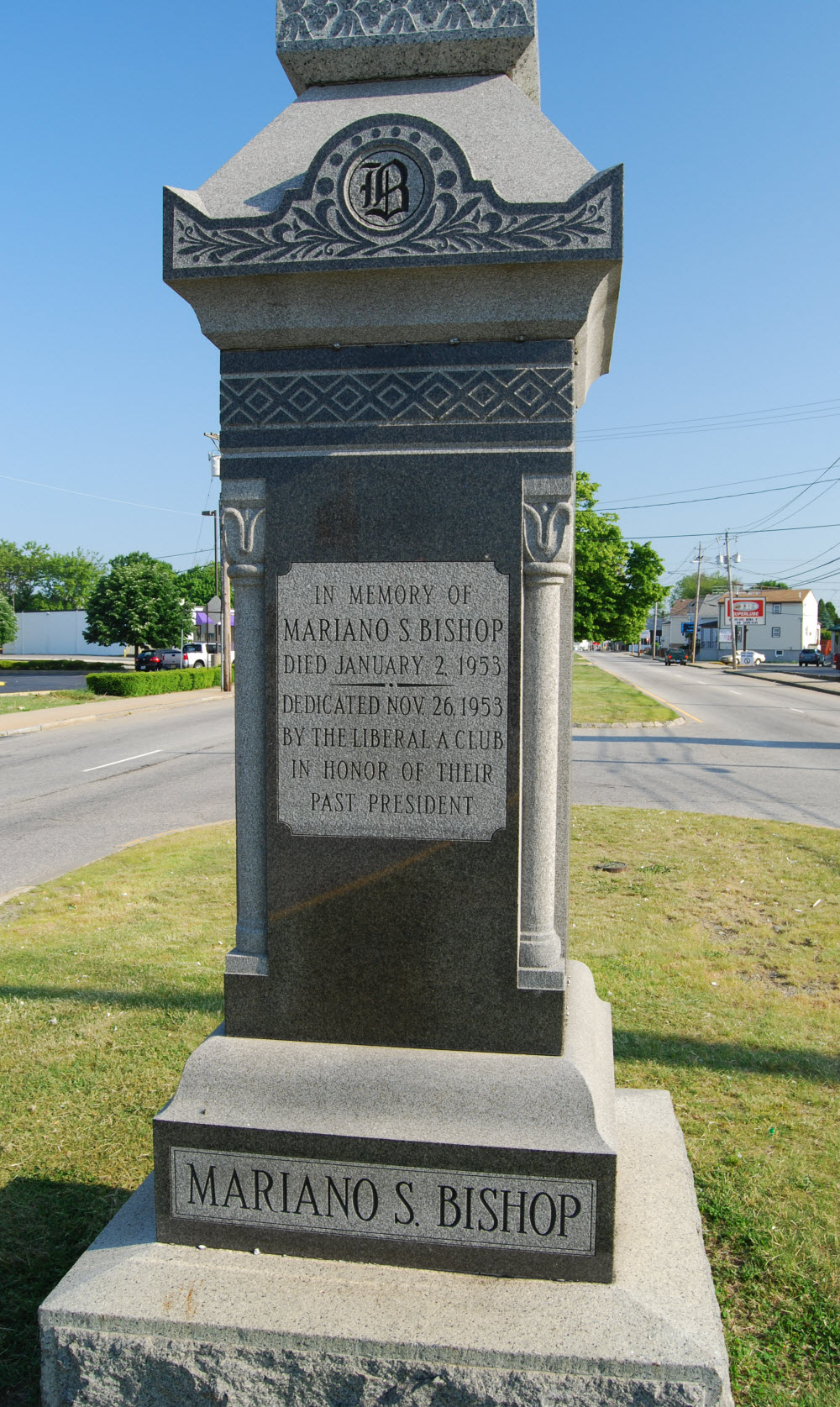
Monument to Mariano S. Bishop, Rhode Island Avenue, Fall River, Massachusetts

Mariano S. Bishop (November 14, 1906 – January 2, 1953) was a labor organizer and union leader who served in turn as principal Organizer, Director, and Executive Vice President of the Textile Workers Union of America.

== Biography ==
Bishop (his last name being an anglicized version of Bispo) was born November 14, 1906, on the island of São Miguel in the Azores and grew up in the south end of Fall River, Massachusetts, where his family brought him as a young child. In his twenties he starred with Ponta Delgada, an amateur soccer club based in Fall River, which drew players from the Portuguese immigrant community, among the most celebrated amateur soccer clubs in United States history.

The movement that led to the forming of the Congress of Industrial Organizations, proposed in 1932, independent of the American Federation of Labor, attracted, among others, Polish, Lithuanian, Italian, and Portuguese immigrant workers from all over industrial New England. Bishop was one of these.

In 1934 he led the massive strike of textile workers in Fall River, a city among the largest producers of cotton goods in the world. This was part of the largest strike in American history, an action by 400,000 textile workers in all areas of the country, which ended unsuccessfully and destroyed the United Textile Workers, the predecessor of the Textile Workers Union of America. Bishop's athletic abilities proved ever useful when facing down management enforcers.

The Textile Workers' Union of America was founded in 1939 in Philadelphia. Emil Rieve became its first President and Mariano Bishop was its principal Organizer. The TWUA succeeded from the Textile Workers' Organizing Committee established by the Amalgamated Clothing Workers of America and the CIO in 1937. By the end of World War II the TWUA had organized most textile workers and others in New England with 70,000 Southerners as well, improving wages and conditions greatly. Bishop became one of the directors of the TWUA in 1943 and became international executive vice president in 1952.

Bishop died suddenly at 46 on January 2, 1953, suffering a heart attack on the way to a union meeting in New Jersey. His funeral in Fall River was said at the time to have been the largest in city history.

Known in his day in his hometown as "The Most Important American of Portuguese Descent," Bishop remains an important figure of Portuguese-American heritage.

Mariano S. Bishop Boulevard in Fall River is named for him.
