= Bela Sumares =

Portuguese American entertainer

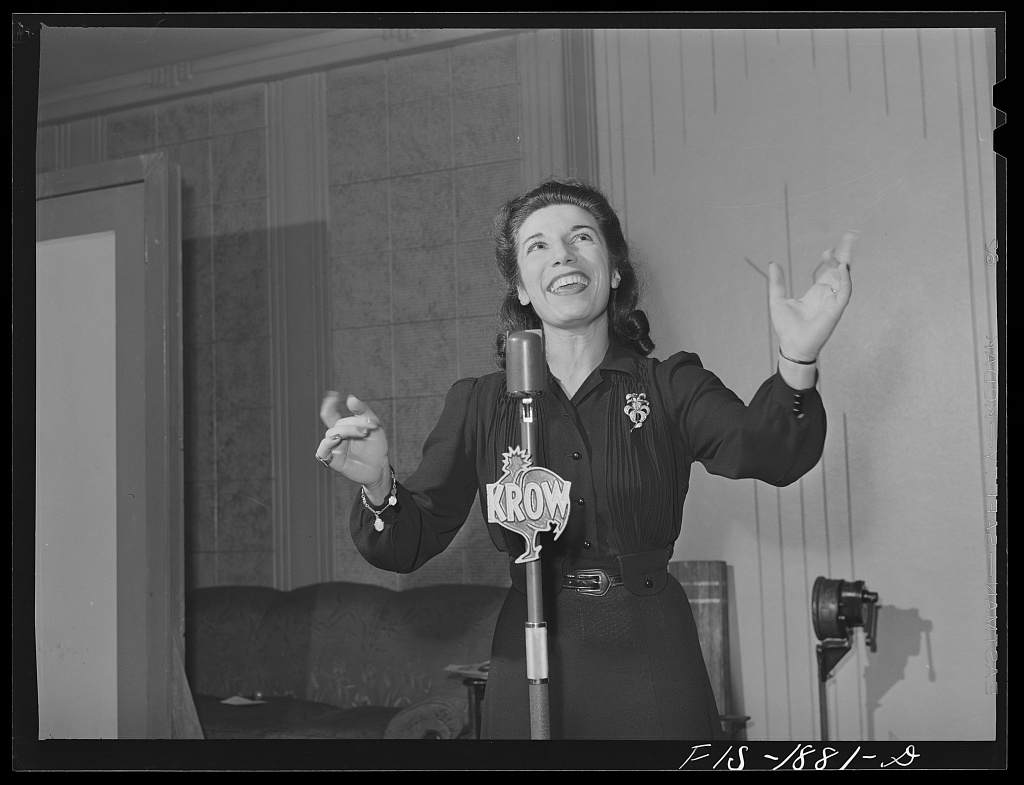
- Sumares in 1942
- Born: Cambridge, MA
- Died: July 2, 1980 (aged 68)
- Other name: Poppy of California

Izabel "Bela" Zita Sumares (July 2, 1912 - March 2, 1980) was a Portuguese American entertainer who led a weekly radio show in Oakland, California.

== Early life ==
Sumares was born in Cambridge, Massachusetts, one of five children. Her parents, Mary (Souza) and Antonio Sumares, were both born in Madeira, Portugal. She lived in Oakland, California.

== Career ==
Described as "a cross between Carmen Miranda and Martha Raye," Sumares could sing, dance, and perform comedy. She led a group of Portuguese Americans who put on a daily hour-long radio program daily on KROW in Oakland, California. Called "an early star of Portuguese radio," Sumares would sing in both Portuguese and English. Their Portuguese Variety Show performed at festivals in California in the 1930s through the 1960s. Sumares took her act on the road and performed at other Portuguese-themed events.

Sumares created her own radio program Hora da Papoila (Poppy Time) which ran weekly on KSAN. Later in her career she would sometimes represent Brazil at Pan-American events.
