= Joseph E. Carrico =

American tennis official

Joseph Carrico
- Born: January 17, 1925; Louisville, Kentucky, U.S.
- Died: November 3, 1988 (aged 63); The Woodlands, Texas, U.S.
- Education: Miami University; University of Illinois
- Occupations: Management consultant, tennis official

Joseph E. Carrico (January 17, 1925 – November 3, 1988) was an American management consultant and tennis official. He was the president of the United States Tennis Association from 1979 to 1980. He was a strong proponent of letting the South African team compete in the Davis Cup despite anti-apartheid backlash. He was inducted into the Chicago Tennis Hall of Fame.

== Early life ==
Joseph E. Carrico was born on January 17, 1925, in Louisville, Kentucky. He had four brothers. During World War II, he served in the United States Navy. After the war, he graduated from Miami University in 1948, and he earned a master's degree in accounting from the University of Illinois.

== Career ==
Carrico was a partner at Arthur Andersen in Chicago, where he was on the team that first used computers for business purposes in 1952. The team used the computer to make payroll for General Electric. He retired in 1974.

Carrico was the secretary of the United States Tennis Association from 1973 to 1974, its second vice president from 1974 to 1976, its first vice president from 1977 to 1978, and its president from 1979 to 1980. In 1976, he said he found it "intolerable" for some countries to drop out of the Davis Cup to boycott South Africa's apartheid regime; he argued, "People who want to play politics should go play among themselves. And the people who want to play tennis should play among themselves." When South Africa competed against the United States for the Davis Cup at Vanderbilt University's Memorial Gymnasium in Nashville, Tennessee in March 1978, Carrico blamed the low attendance on negative stories published by The Tennessean, even after a reporter was escorted out of the gym by the police.

Carrico was also the president of the Western Tennis Association. He was inducted into the Chicago Tennis Hall of Fame in 2004.

== Personal life and death ==
Carrico has a son, John and a daughter, Deborah Banta. He resided first in Lake Forest, Illinois, and later in The Woodlands, Texas, where he died while playing tennis on November 3, 1988.
