= Maria Lawton =

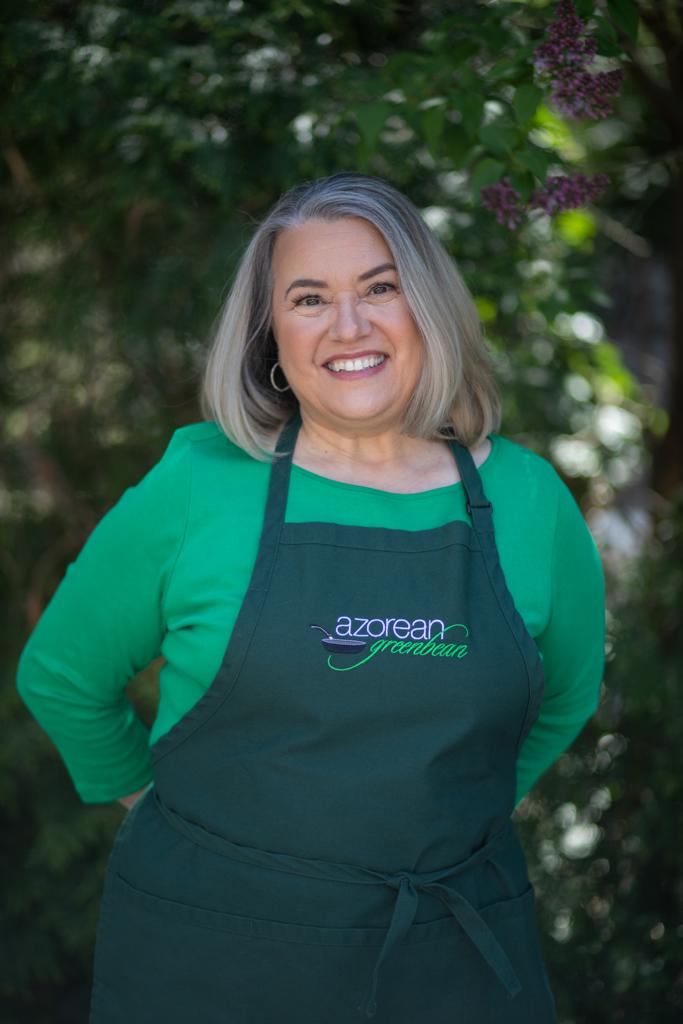

Maria Lawton is a Portuguese American food writer, author, TV host, and culinary travel guide.

== Early life ==
Maria Lawton was born in São Miguel, Azores. In 1967, she emigrated to New Bedford, Massachusetts.

== Career ==
In 2013, Maria created a Portuguese food blog named "The Azorean Green Bean". In March 2014, she self-published her first book, Azorean Cooking: From My Family Table to Yours. In 2016, she became a co-host on the podcast "Our Portuguese Table" alongside Angela Simoes. The podcast discussed Portuguese food and culture. Lawton has also been featured on podcasts such as "Amateur Traveler Podcast", "Destination Eat Drink", and "Topics Under the Stairs" as well as magazines such as Edible South Shore & South Coast and Relish Portugal.

In 2019, Lawton debuted "Maria's Portuguese Table", a two-season travel culinary show. In November 2024, she published her second book, At My Portuguese Table: Azorean Cooking and More. In October 2025, she published a children's book, Baking with Love: Maria and Her Avó's Sweet Recipes for Little Chefs.

== Awards ==
- 43rd Boston New England Emmy Awards Nominee
- Award Honoree for the 13th Annual Taste Awards
- Bronze Winner for the 43rd Annual Telly Awards, Series: Food and Beverage
- Silver Winner for the 43rd Annual Telly Awards, Series: Cultural
- PALCUS Leadership in Entrepreneurship
- Inductee of the 12th Annual Taste Hall of Fame
- Bronze Winner for the 2025 IPNE Books of the Year: Nonfiction
