= Ramana Vieira =

American singer

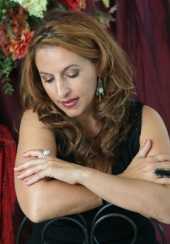
Fado singer Ramana Vieira, San Francisco, California

Ramana Vieira is a contemporary American singer of the traditional Portuguese Fado.

== Early life ==
Vieira was born just east of San Francisco, California in San Leandro. Her parents had immigrated to the United States from Portugal, where her grandfather was a well-known musician and composer from Madeira. She grew up listening to American pop music and Broadway musicals, along with the traditional Portuguese music from her parents' homeland. She attended local San Leandro schools, then studied the performing arts at the American Conservatory Theater (ACT) in San Francisco. Vieira said that as a young singer she had no interest in performing fado until she visited Portugal when she was 16 years old. In Portugal, Vieira connected with her roots and found that fado ignited her passion. She began to study intensively with local fado musicians and had the opportunity to perform.

== Career ==
Vieira recorded her debut album, Sem Ti (Without You) in 2000. In 2004, she self-released a CD titled Despi a Alma (I Undressed My Soul). The album included the song Para Amar which was included in a video montage for the 2006 Winter Olympics. Vieira was among the performers who sang at the 2008 MusiCares Person of the Year ceremony. In 2009, she released the album Lagrimas De Rainha (Tears of a Queen), which (according to Vieira's press releases), reached number 43 on the World Music Radio charts. In 2015, Vieira released (Fado da Vida), of which several tracks have been nominated at the International Portuguese Music Awards (IPMA). In 2015 she had two nominations: Nem As Paredes Confesso was nominated for Best Fado Performance; and Cabo Verde, which Vieira composed herself was nominated for Best World Music Performance. In 2016, the International Portuguese Music Awards nominated Ai Mouraria for Best Fado Performance.

== Discography ==
- Sem Ti (Without You), 2000, Simply Smokin' Records
- Despi a Alma (I Undressed My Soul), 2004, Ramana Vieira
- Lágrimas De Rainha (Tears of a Queen), 2009, Pacific Coast Records
- Fado da Vida (Fado/Destiny of Life), 2015, Stillumiounous Productions
- Lágrimas de Rainha, 2017, Stillumiounous Productions
