= Sam Pereira =

American poet

Sam Pereira is an American poet from Los Banos, California. He received his Bachelor of Arts degree from California State University, Fresno (1971) and his Master of Fine Arts degree from the University of Iowa (1975), where he was a student in the Iowa Writers' Workshop.

His books include: The Marriage of the Portuguese (L'Epervier Press, 1978), Brittle Water (Abattoir Editions/Penumbra Press, University of Nebraska at Omaha, 1987), and A Cafe in Boca, released in 2007 by Tebot Bach. An expanded edition of his first book was published in April 2012 by Tagus Press at the University of Massachusetts, Dartmouth. Dusting on Sunday (Tebot Bach) was released in December 2012. In 2015, Bad Angels (Nine Mile Press) was published, and is, among other things, a poetic look at the years Pereira was a student in the Writers' Workshop at the University of Iowa. In December, 2020, Nine Mile Press published Pereira's collection of poems, True North and Untrue You, which was his seventh book. In March of 2026, Bruma Publications-PBBI-Fresno State, in conjunction with Letras Lavadas in Ponta Delgada, Azores released Pereira's long-awaited Code Blue--New & Selected Poems containing poems from the earlier volumes, as well as a generous selection of previously unpublished new material.

Work of his has also appeared in several anthologies of contemporary American poetry in recent decades, among them: Piecework: 19 Fresno Poets (Silver Skates, 1987), The Body Electric (W. W. Norton, 2000), and How Much Earth: The Fresno Poets (Heyday/Roundhouse Press, 2001).

His poems have been included in numerous magazines as well, among them, Alaska Quarterly Review, The American Poetry Review, Antioch Review, CutBank, Manoa, The Missouri Review, Poetry, Connotation Press and Blackbird.

Pereira was a Language Arts Teacher at Los Banos Junior High School until he retired in 2019. He currently resides in Los Banos, California.
