= Manny Matos (footballer) =

Portuguese-American soccer player and coach

Personal information
- Full name: Manuel Matos
- Place of birth: São Miguel Island, Portugal
- Height: 5 ft 11 in (1.80 m)
- Position: Midfielder

College career
Years	Team	Apps	(Gls)
1971–1974	West Virginia Mountaineers		

Senior career*
Years	Team	Apps	(Gls)
1975–1976	Philadelphia Atoms	20	(1)
1977	New England Oceaneers	15	(0)
1978	New England Tea Men		
- * Club domestic league appearances and goals

Manuel "Manny" Matos is a retired Portuguese-American football (soccer) midfielder who played professionally in the North American Soccer League and American Soccer League.

A native of Portugal, Matos grew up in New Bedford, MA. In 1971, he graduated from New Bedford High School. He is a member of the New Haven Athletic Hall of Fame. He attended West Virginia University where he was a 1973 and 1974 Honorable Mention (third team) All American soccer player. In 1975, he turned professional with the Philadelphia Atoms of the North American Soccer League. In 1977, Matos returned to New Bedford where he became the High School boys soccer coach. He would coach the team for twenty-four years and was inducted into the Massachusetts High School Soccer Coaches Association Hall of Fame in 2001. On May 5, 1978, the New England Tea Men of the North American Soccer League signed Matos. The Tea Men released Matos on December 23, 1978. He also played for the Rhode Island Oceaneers of the American Soccer League and for Portuguese Sports of the Luso American Soccer Association (LASA).
