= Timothy J. Mello =

Timothy "Timmy the Bat" Mello (born September 21, 1956 in Fall River, Massachusetts), is a mobster associated with the Patriarca crime family.

== Association with the Patriarca family ==
During the successful federal prosecutions of the Patriacra's in the early 1990s, remaining Patriarca members began fighting amongst each other for power as Frank Salemme began to consolidate his position in Boston. After a failed attempt on Salemme's life in Saugus, Massachusetts in August 1990, soon after newspapers reported he had become head of Boston's criminal operations, Mello and other criminals in the New England area were contacted.

On the night of August 14, 1990, Mello was observed with Gordon O'Brien, William Anthony, a recently paroled freelance hitman from West Warwick, as they sat in a parked car in on the East Side of Providence, Rhode Island. Although initially holding back on the assumption the three men may have been detectives, patrolman Frank Moody approached the car to investigate when Mello was seen taking a blackjack and throwing it onto the car's rear window sill.

Taking the men into custody at gunpoint, a later search of the car turned up police equipment including badges, handcuffs, "police" printed baseball caps, a portable police scanner, a police spotlight and siren. Anthony readily agreed to cooperate with authorities, however, refusing to submit to a lie detector test, Anthony was dropped from entering the Witness Protection Program. Although an altercation between Mello and officers attempting to fingerprint him would result in his being restrained by several detectives while in custody, the three would be released on bail (Hanrahan, who had been waiting in a van a block from the others, had fled the scene after witnessing their arrest).

State investigators later discovered through talks with Anthony that the three were planning to kidnap Patriarca bookmaker Blaise Marfeo. Waiting outside his Adesso Restaurant, the men would "arrest" Marfeo on the pretense of a routine traffic stop and drive him to a safehouse in Fall River where they would ransom him for between $250,000-$300,000 or simply murder him.

== Return to Fall River ==
After the gangland slaying of Hanrahan, Mello retreated from Providence and began competing with rival criminals over bookmaking operations from the recently retired Donald Waterhouse. His rivals included Louie Alexander, and Joe Savitch, whose remains would be found in northern Maine three years following their disappearance in 1995, and Gerard Ouimette who would eventually be convicted of extortion charges that same year. Associate Peter "Thumbs" Costa was also questioned in the disappearance of other rivals, but refused to talk to authorities.

With Mello left as the dominant figure in the local underworld, he soon entered into "legitimate" businesses including the fishing industry building a multimillion-dollar empire over a nine-year period as the owner of Tempest Fisheries processing plant in 1994 and controlling over small fleet of fishing boats as well as the Fall River-based insurance company Cost Plus, the property management company TEK Properties and local King's Highway restaurant Fatso's (formerly the Rocking Horse Pub).

In recent years, he has made large donations to local organizations through Tempest Fisheries including Fall River youth sports, drug rehabilitation centers and, most notably, the donation of $25,000 to the newly built Atlantis Charter School in 2001.

== Federal prosecution and imprisonment ==
Shortly after becoming married the previous July, Mello was arrested by federal agents at his home in Dartmouth on September 17, 2002. Indicted by authorities on 51 charges including extortion and waterfront racketeering charges, including the forced takeover of Tempest Fisheries, Mello was also accused of using five fishing vessels for the purposes of smuggling and distributing marijuana and cocaine in the Fall River and New Bedford area.

On November 17, 2003, Mello pleaded guilty to a racketeering charge. On May 24, 2004, Mello received his sentence: 13 years in jail, with three years of supervised release afterwards.
