= Portuguese in California =

Ethnic group in the U.S. state of California

Total population
- 350,011 (2020, census)

Regions with significant populations
- Northern California, Coastal California, Central Valley

Languages
- American English, Portuguese

Religion
- Roman Catholic

Related ethnic groups
- Hispanic and Latino Americans, Portuguese Americans, Brazilian Americans, Cape Verdean Americans

California has the largest Portuguese community in the United States. California's Portuguese community began immigrating during the 19th century and have been influential in California's whaling, fishing, and agricultural industries. Several prominent cities, such as Oakland, San Jose, and San Diego, had large Portuguese communities. Portuguese religious festivals, known as festas, are thrown throughout California in the summer.

As of the 2020 U.S. Census, there are 350,011 Portuguese Americans in California.

== History ==
=== First Portuguese in California ===
Juan Rodriguez Cabrillo, sometimes written as João Rodrigues Cabrilho, was a 16th-century sailor and the first European to navigate along the present-day California coast. Cabrillo was Portuguese and under the service of the Spanish empire.

The earliest recorded Portuguese to settle in what is now the state of California was Antonio José Rocha. Rocha immigrated to the Spanish province of Alta California in 1815 and built a house which eventually served as the first Los Angeles city hall after the American Conquest of California.

=== Azorean Immigration ===
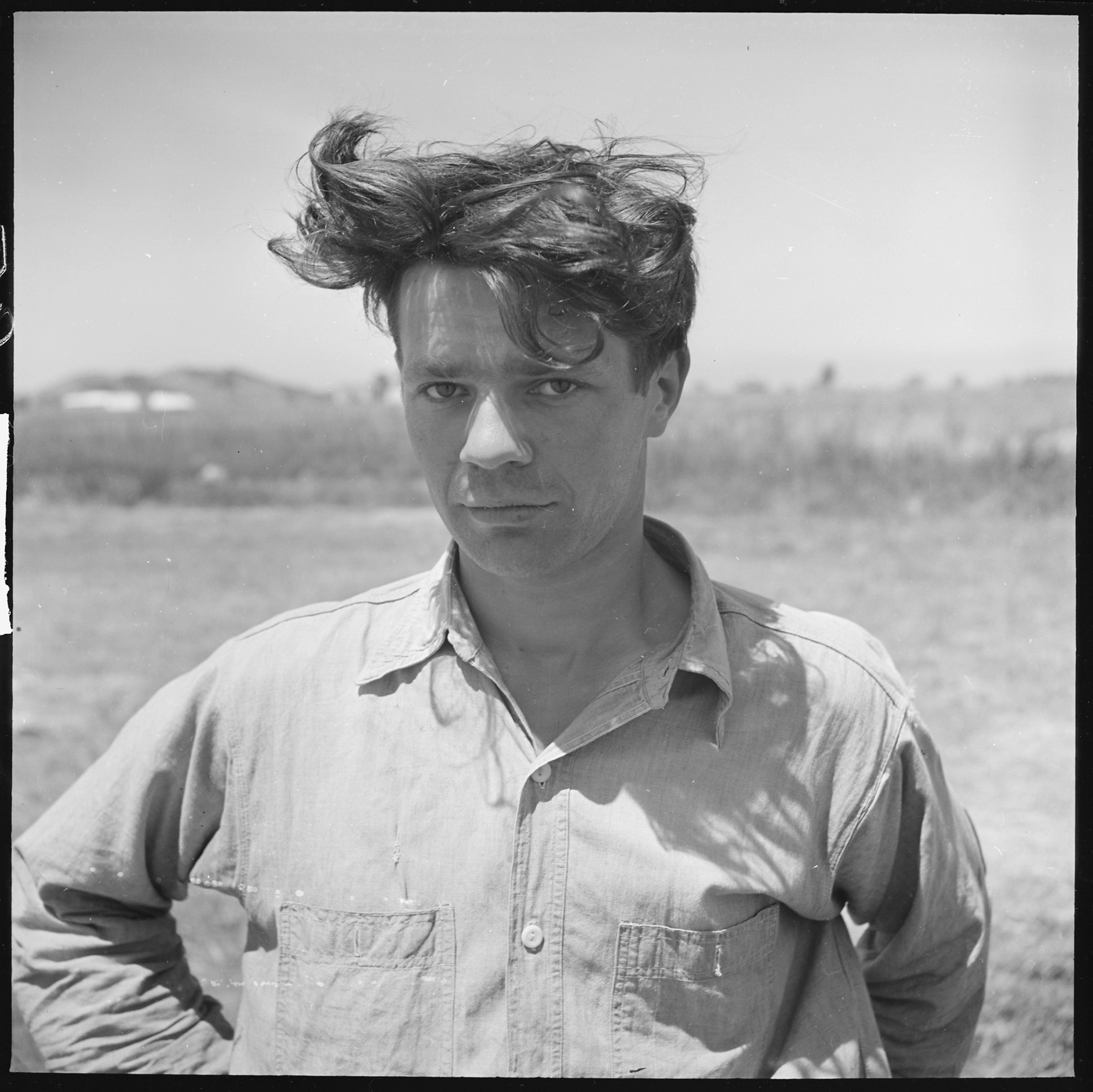
Portrait taken by American photographer Rondal Partridge of a Portuguese farmer in Alameda County, California in 1940.

Many Portuguese people began to immigrate to California around the mid to late 1800s as whalers in California's whaling industry or miners during the California gold rush. These Portuguese immigrants were primarily from the Azores. Young Azorean men would stow away on American whaling ships as crewman and eventually find work or settle in New England, coastal California, or Hawaii. Portuguese whalers in California established whaling stations along the California coast, in places like Año Nuevo, Pigeon Point, Pillar Point, Monterey, San Simeon, San Luis Obispo, Point Conception, and San Diego from the 1860s to 1880s. As the whaling industry and the gold rush subsided towards the end of the century, some Portuguese found work in fisheries and canneries. Many Portuguese began to work in the agricultural industry, primarily in crop production and dairy farming. Sheepherding was another important profession amongst the Portuguese in California, especially in the San Joaquin Valley. The Portuguese community in Northern California primarily dealt with agriculture, whereas the Portuguese community in Southern California worked in fishing.

Some members of the East Coast's Portuguese community moved to California's Portuguese communities. Portuguese communities became established in Northern Californian cities like Oakland, San Leandro, San Jose, Pescadero, and Half Moon Bay (at the time, known as Spanishtown), and in Southern California in Point Loma. In the 1890 census, the 6 counties with the largest Portuguese population were all in the Bay Area. Many Portuguese lived and worked in the San Joaquin Valley. The 1908 Bancroft treaty between the United States and Portugal aided Portuguese immigration to California, but slowed down starting in 1917 after the US began requiring a literacy test and in 1920 when a quota system was implemented. Portuguese immigration to California surged following the passage of the Azorean Refugee Act of 1958 due to the 1957-1958 Capelinhos volcano eruption on Faial Island.

Turlock became one of the San Joaquin Valley's established Azorean communities in the early 20th century. A City of Turlock historical account states that Portuguese settlers arrived in 1901, primarily from the Azores, and established themselves as farmers and merchants; early settler Manuel Pedras became locally known as the "sweet potato king". A further wave of Azorean immigration following the 1957–1958 volcanic eruption in the Azores substantially increased Turlock's Portuguese population. The community established institutions including Our Lady of the Assumption Portuguese Church and organizations dedicated to preserving Azorean religious and cultural traditions.

As of the 2000s, some Azoreans who immigrated and became successful in California have migrated back to their home towns to retire.

== Geography ==
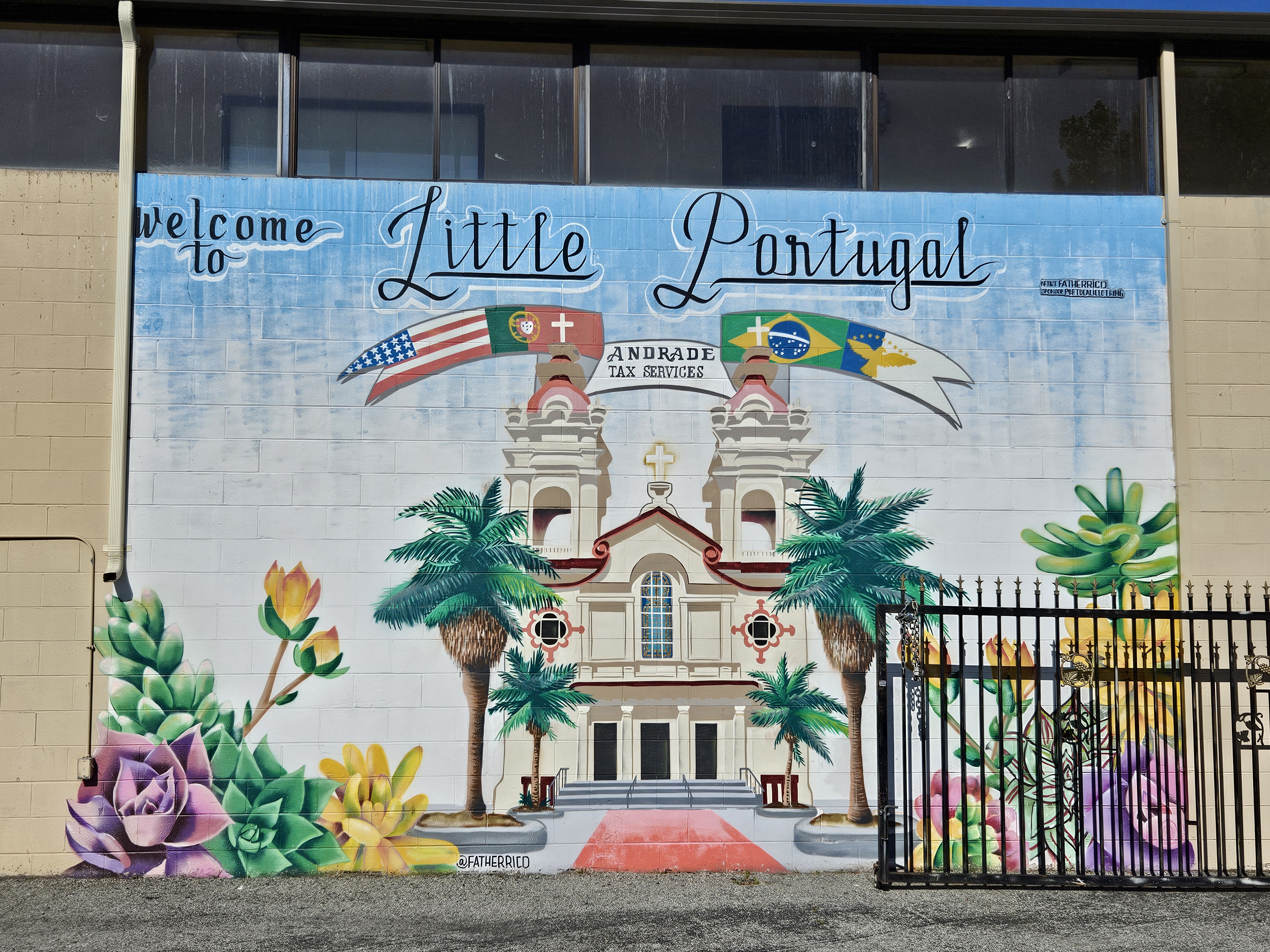
Mural of the Five Wounds Portuguese National Church along with American, Portuguese, Brazilian, and Azorean flags in Little Portugal, San Jose.

According to the 2020 U.S. Census, California is the state with the most Portuguese Americans at 350,011 people. In the 1940s, 49.1% of Portuguese Americans resided in California.

Portuguese Americans can be found throughout California, but are most prevalent in the Central Valley. The cities of Oakland, San Leandro, and San Jose had historically large Portuguese communities. The Little Portugal neighborhood of San Jose is home to San Jose's Portuguese community.

Many place names throughout California carry the name "Portuguese" due to the Portuguese community. Portuguese Bend is one such example.

== Institutions ==
=== Mutual aid and fraternal societies ===
Mutual aid societies were an important part of Portuguese society in the Azores, and were also established by Portuguese immigrants in California. The Portuguese Union of the State of California (União Portuguesa do Estado da Califórnia, U.P.E.C) was the first Portuguese fraternal society in California and was established in San Leandro in August 1880. In 2010, U.P.E.C merged with three other fraternal societies to form the Portuguese Fraternal Society of America (PFSA).

Portuguese immigrants in California also established Fraternal Insurance companies. The Associação Portuguesa Protectora e Beneficiente, also known as the Benevolent Society of California, was the first Portuguese mutual benefit society in California and was established in San Francisco in 1868. After a merger and a name change, the organization still exists in the modern day as Luso-American Financial.

Several other Portuguese mutual aid and fraternal societies have existed in California, such as the Sociedade Portuguesa Rainha Santa Izabel, the Clube Luso-Americano, the Real Associação Benemerita Autonomica Micaelense, the Clube Lusitania, and the Clube Cívico Português-Americano.

=== Other ===
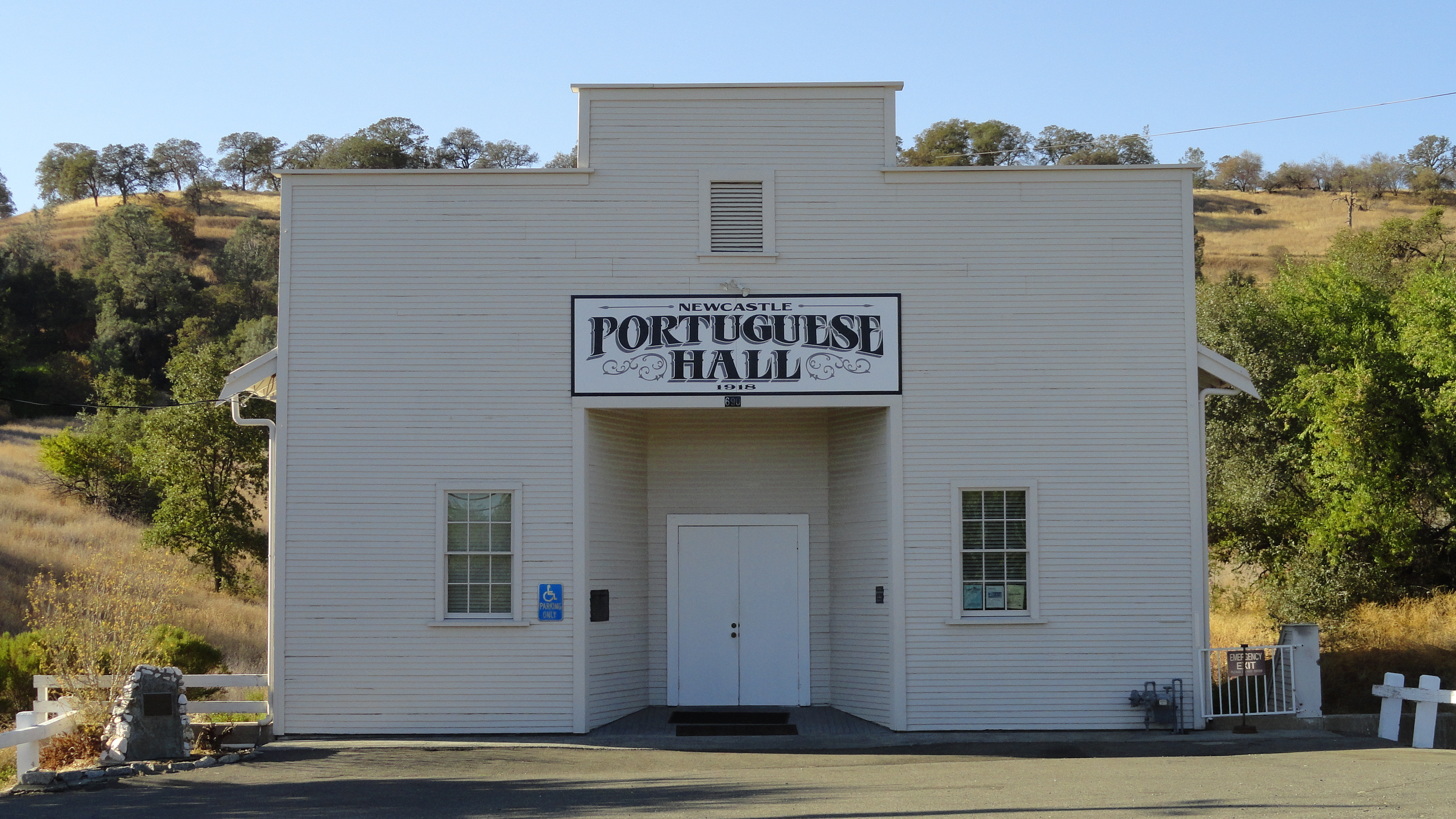
Portuguese social hall in Newcastle, California.

The Portuguese Historical Museum in San Jose hosts exhibits regarding Portuguese communities throughout the United States.

In 2023, the Carnegie Library of Kings County featured an exhibit on Portuguese history in Kings County.

The J.A. Freitas Library is "the largest Portuguese private library on the West Coast of the United States" and is currently located at the PFSA Cultural Center in Modesto.

There is a Portuguese Historical Center in San Diego.

== Politics ==
Several Portuguese-American congressmen, such as Republicans John Duarte and David Valadao and Democrats Jim Costa and Dennis Cardoza have held districts in the Central Valley.

== Media ==
=== Newspapers ===
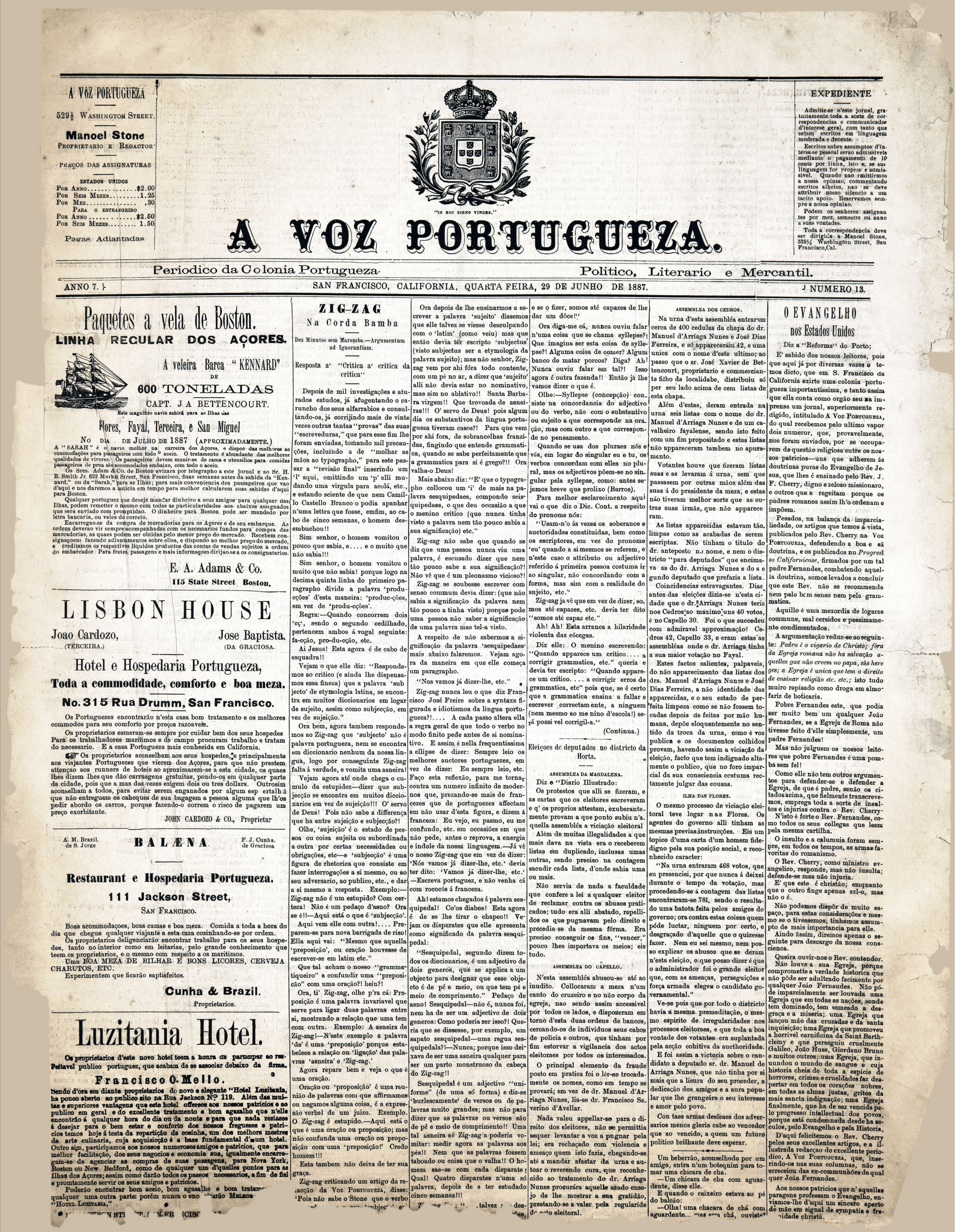
An 1887 issue of A Voz Portugueza, the first Portuguese newspaper published in California.

The Portuguese in California founded newspapers for their community. Newspapers published content such as the views of the Catholic church, political opinions, early 20th century labor movements, and community updates such as births, deaths, and social events in the Azores and their local communities in California.

The first Portuguese newspaper in California was A Voz Portugueza, and was established by Antonio Maria Vicente in August 1880. By 1956, at least 20 other Portuguese newspapers had circulated since the creation of A Voz Portugueza. Some Portuguese newspapers that circulated in California were Jornal Português and A Colonia Portugueza in Oakland, O Progresso Californiense and A União Portugueza in San Francisco, A Liberdade and A California Alegre in Sacramento, O Lavrador Portuguez in Leemore, and Portugalia and O Portugal. Until at least 1956, some Portuguese fraternal groups also published monthly newspapers or bulletins. As of 2020, The Portuguese Tribune was the only Portuguese newspaper on the West Coast.

In 2012, the Ferreira-Mendes Portuguese-American Archives at the University of Massachusetts Dartmouth digitized issues of A Voz Portugueza and 13 other Portuguese newspapers published in California between 1885 and 1940.

=== Radio stations ===
Portuguese-language radio programs were broadcast on KLX, KROW, and KTAB in Oakland, and KCOK in Tulare. In 1940, the Jornal Português inaugurated the Portuguese-language radio program Hora de Arte Radiofónica (The Radio Hour of Art) on KSRO in Santa Rosa.

KLBS in Los Banos and KSQQ in Morgan Hill are dedicated Portuguese-language radio stations.

=== Television ===
In the 1990s, the Portuguese community of Half Moon Bay successfully rallied the local cable TV company to carry "some broadcasts from Portugal and a few hours of local programming in Portuguese".

== Education ==
=== Primary and Secondary School ===
In 1976, 25 California school districts offered bilingual Portuguese programs. In 2014, eleven High Schools in California offered Portuguese language classes. Three of which were in Tulare, with one program having recently reached its 40th year of instruction. In 2021, the Hilmar Unified School District offered Portuguese-English dual-immersion language programs.

In 2025, the Los Angeles Unified School District and the Camões Institute signed a Memorandum of Understanding (MoU) to promote Portuguese language and cultural education in the Los Angeles metropolitan area. The STEM Magnet Academy and Daniel Pearl High School in the San Fernando Valley have been offering Portuguese language programs since 2023.

In 2026, the California Department of Education and the Camões Institute signed a MoU to promote Portuguese language and cultural education in California's school system.

=== Higher education ===
In 1973, the University of California Santa Barbara hosted its first Summer Institute in Portuguese language program.

The Portuguese Beyond Borders Institute (PBBI) was established in 2019 at Fresno State with a $130,000 grant from the Luso-American Development Foundation. The institute serves the Portuguese American community by running events, documenting local history, and supporting research.

== Religion ==
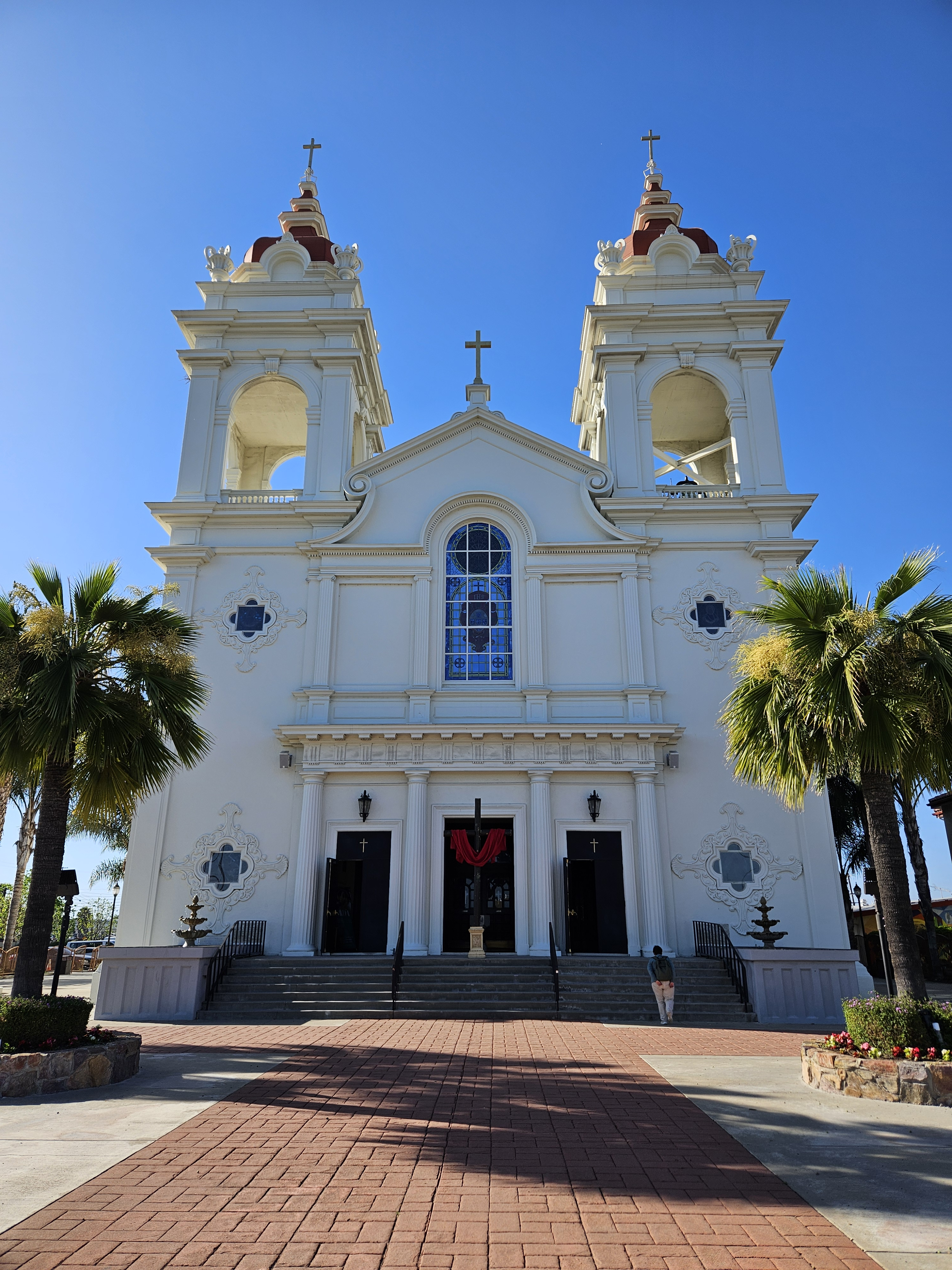
The Five Wounds Portuguese National Church was established in 1914 by the Portuguese in Little Portugal, San Jose.

The Portuguese community of California traditionally is Roman Catholic.

=== Religious societies ===
Veneration of the Holy Spirit, a religious sub-culture known as the Cult of the Holy Spirit, was the most popular aspect of religious life in the Azores and continued to be practiced in California by Azorean immigrants. The Portuguese established several Irmandades do Divino Espirito Santo (Holy Ghost brotherhoods, sometimes abbreviated as IDES or I.D.E.S) throughout California. Until at least 2009, 98 of the officially recorded 149 IDES ever founded were still active. Almost all IDES own their own social halls. The Sausalito Portuguese Cultural Center was founded as the Irmandade do Divino Espírito Santo e Santissima Trindade (Brotherhood of the Holy Ghost and the Blessed Trinity) in 1888, and is the oldest Portuguese hall in the North Bay.

The Santo Cristo Society in South San Francisco and the Santo Cristo Society of San Mateo County venerate Senhor Santo Cristo.

=== Religious festivals ===
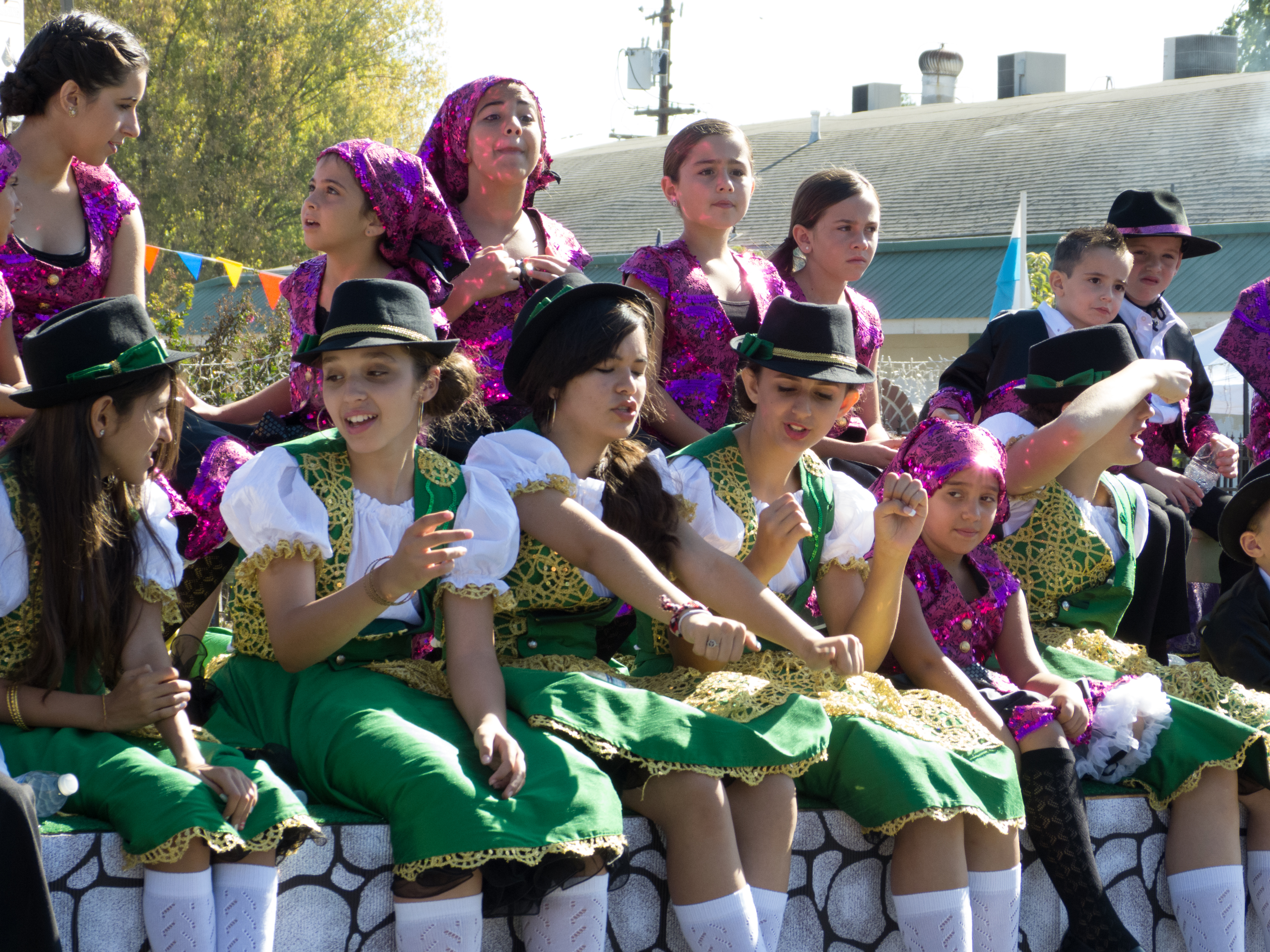
Children on a parade float during the 2012 Our Lady of Fatima festival in Thornton, California.

The Holy Ghost Festival, sometimes referred to as a Holy Ghost Festa, Chamarrita, (Note: Named after the Chamarrita, a Portuguese dance.) or simply Festa, has been celebrated by California's Azorean community since the 1900s. The Festa commemorates a 14th-century legend that tells of a famine in the Azores that was "averted by divine intervention when a ship arrived with provisions on Pentecost Sunday". Festas are celebrated after Easter and through the Summer. Festas in California typically last three days, beginning on Fridays and going until Sundays or sometimes Mondays. Festas have parades, crowning of a queen, dances, fundraising auctions, and mass. Festas traditionally feature banquets of Portuguese food, which have expanded into full barbecues in some celebrations.

Holy Ghost Festivals can be found in California cities with historic Portuguese communities like San Jose, Half Moon Bay, Sausalito, Tracy, Gilroy, Newark, San Leandro, Lincoln, and Hayward. The first celebration of the Holy Ghost is believed to have occurred in Carmel around 1865.

As of 2009, the largest Portuguese festivals in California are Our Lady of Fatima in Thornton and Our Lady of Miracles in Gustine.

=== Bull fighting ===
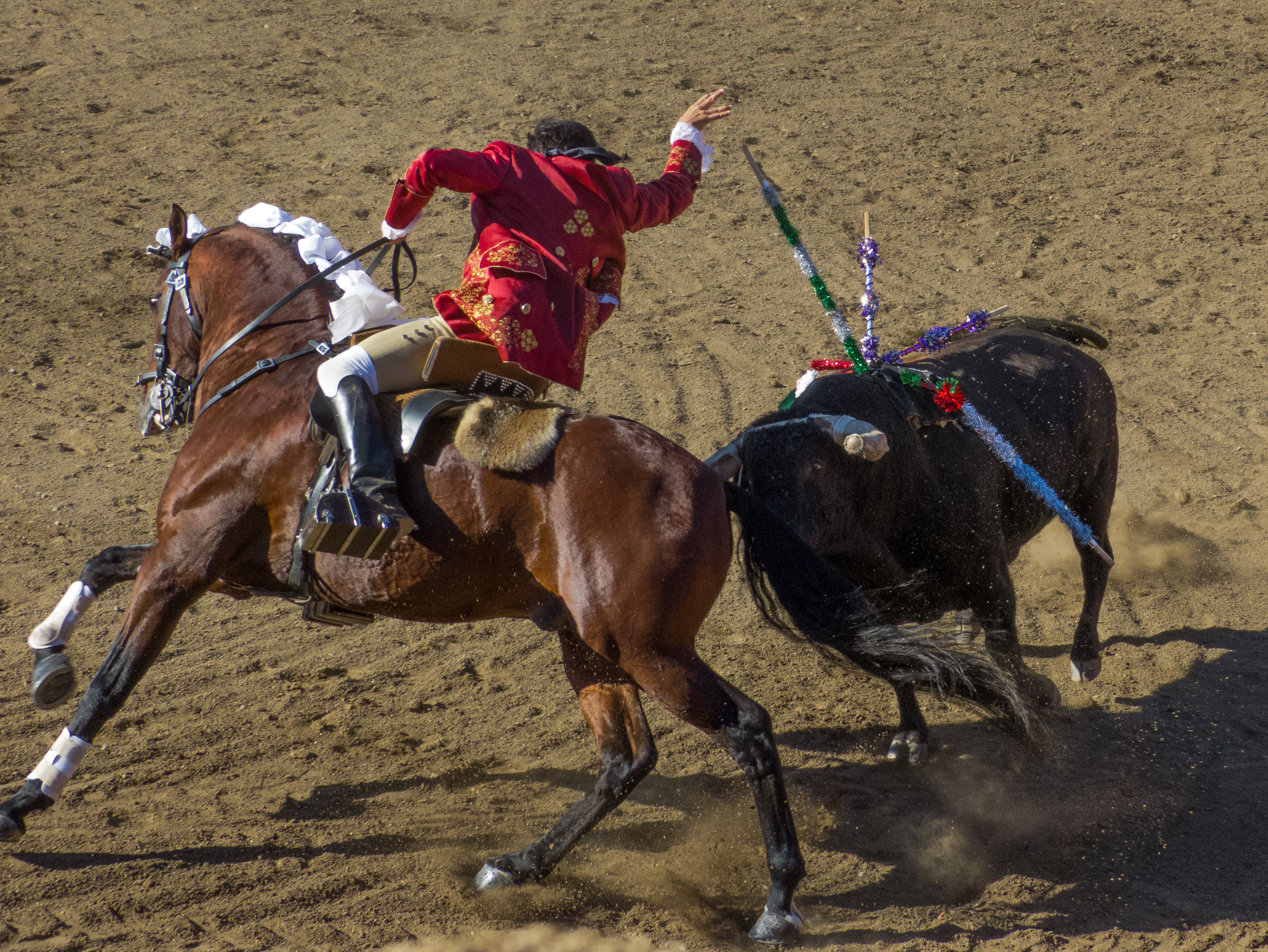
Cavaleiro marking a bull with a Velcro-tipped bandarilha at the 2012 Our Lady of Fatima festival in Thornton, California.

Portuguese-style bullfighting is practiced in some small communities in the Central Valley. While California outlawed Spanish-style bullfighting in 1957, the bloodless Portuguese-style was allowed so long as the bulls weren't physically harmed and the events coincided with religious festivals. In California, the Cavaleiros use Velcro-tipped bandarilhas to mark bulls with Velcro pads attached to the bull's backs.

Portuguese-style bullfighting is done in Tracy, Turlock, Thornton, Stevinson, Gustine, and Artesia.

== Culture ==
As of June 2025, California recognizes the month of June as Portuguese Heritage Month, June 9 as the Day of the Azores, and June 10 as the Day of Portugal. The Portuguese Historical Society hosts an annual Dia de Portugal festival in San Jose.

== Cuisine ==
Portuguese restaurants can be found throughout California in cities like San Jose, Sacramento, Sonoma, and Hanford. Adega, a Portuguese restaurant in Little Portugal, was San Jose's first restaurant to receive a Michelin star.

Since 2022, some Portuguese restaurants have participated in a promotional event to show off Portuguese cuisine in California called Portugal Restaurant Week.

Portuguese foods, such as sopas (lit. 'soup'), are generally served at Festas.

== Notable people ==
- Devin Nunes – Politician
- Richard Pombo — Politician
- David Valadao – Politician
- Alexandra Macedo – Politician
- Jim Costa – Politician
- Tony Coelho – Politician
- Steve Perry – Musician
- Mel Ramos – Artist
- A. J. Soares – Professional soccer player
- Tom Hanks – Actor
- Harold Peary – Actor
- Alberto M. Carvalho – Former superintendent of the Los Angeles Unified School District
- Nathan Oliveira – Artist
- Lyndsy Fonseca – Actress
- Dave Franco – Actor
- James Franco – Actor
- Tom Franco – Actor
- Danica McKellar – Actress
- Jesse Metcalfe – Actor
- Larry Correia – Author
- Sam Pereira – Poet
- Katherine Vaz – Author
- Harold Gonsalves – Marine
- George Perry – Neuroscientist
- Bela Sumares – Entertainer
- Craig Chaquico – Musician
