= The Portuguese Tribune =

Newspaper in Modesto, California

The Portuguese Tribune Tribuna Portuguesa
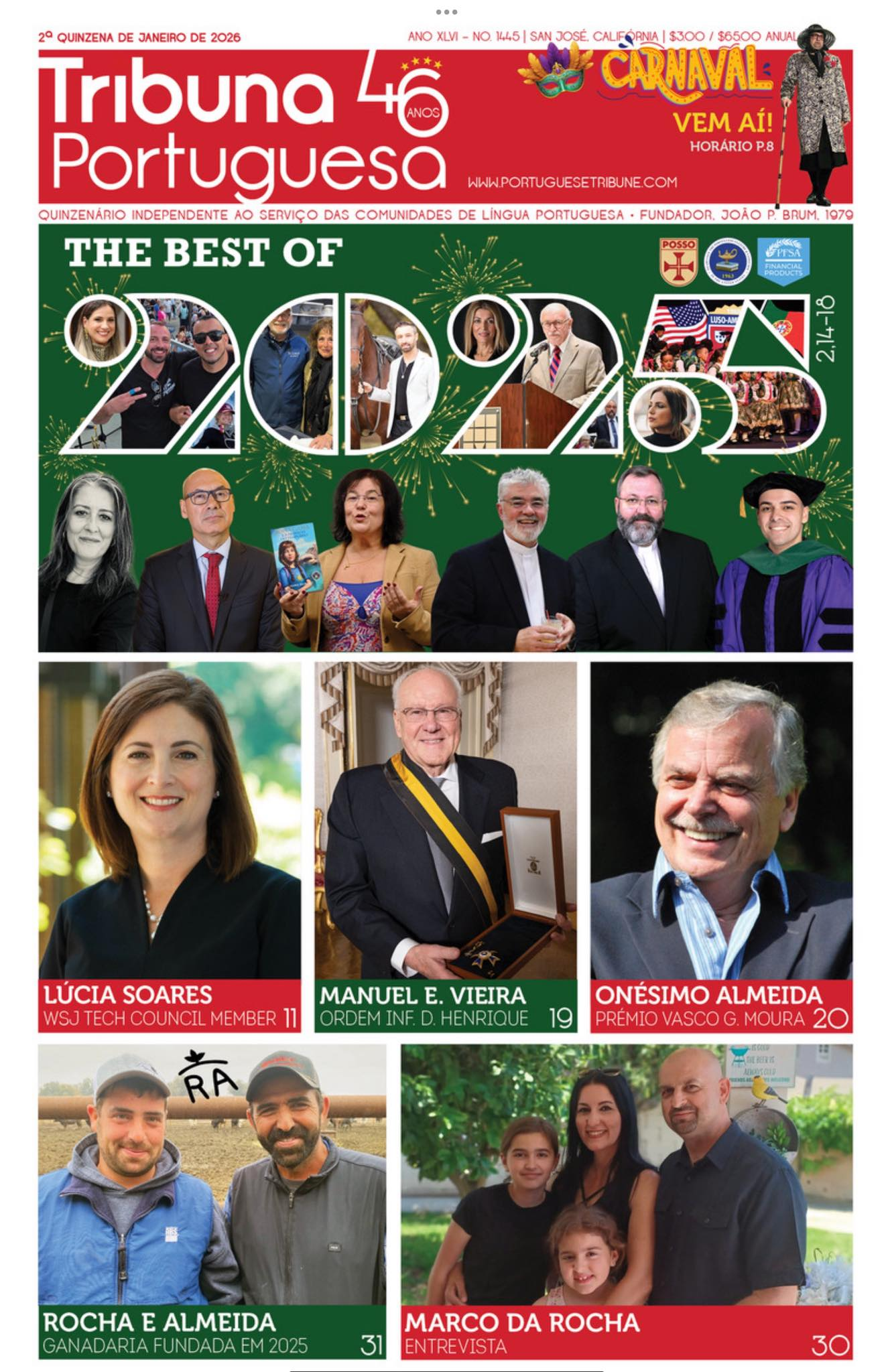
- Type: Weekly newspaper
- Owner: The Tagus Group
- Publisher: José B. Ávila
- Editor: Miguel Valle Ávila
- Founded: 1979
- Language: Portuguese; English
- Website: portuguesetribune.com

The Portuguese Tribune, known in Portuguese as Tribuna Portuguesa, is a Portuguese bilingual newspaper serving the Portuguese-American community in California. Headquartered in San Jose, California, the newspaper was founded in 1979, in the Little Portugal neighborhood of San Jose. From 2003 through 2023, the Tribune was published by the Tagus Group headquartered in Modesto, California.

== History ==
It was founded in July 1979 by John P. Brum in San Jose, CA.

Regularly published since September 1979, The Portuguese Tribune was a weekly newspaper headquartered in the heart of the Portuguese-American community of San Jose — the Little Portugal or Five Wounds neighborhood. In the mid-1980s and under difficult financial and administrative crisis, it was reorganized by entrepreneurs Albert Soares, John (João) Rodrigues da Silveira, and Arthur Thomas under editor Artur da Cunha Oliveira, Azorean writer and future Member of the European Parliament. After Dr. Cunha Oliveira's election to the European Parliament in 1989, the newspaper went through some administrative challenges and irregular publication until radio personality and writer Filomena Rocha Mendes took over.

A couple of years later, the administration was transferred to Jaime Lemos, Armando Antunes, and Helder Antunes, who brought in new columnists, among them, José Ávila, and became a biweekly publication.

In 2003, The Tagus Group presided by José Ávila acquired all rights to the publication and significantly modernized The Portuguese Tribune – increasing the number of contributors and columnists of all ages and opinions, focusing on community events rather than news from Portugal (that subscribers already had access through the web, RTPi TV, and other Portuguese language radio stations), committing to a more in-depth English language section, publishing the newspaper on its entirety on the web with a worldwide readership, redesigning it into a fresh layout, leading to a more than 100% increase in subscribers.

From its original address on Alum Rock Avenue to the corner of 33rd Street to the rectory of Five Wounds Portuguese National Church to 27th Street, all in San Jose's Little Portugal district to its present address in Modesto, The Portuguese Tribune has evolved with the times and celebrated its 30th anniversary in September 2009. In October 2015, Miguel Valle Ávila assumed the role of editor-in-chief.

In September 2024, The Portuguese Tribune celebrated its 45th anniversary. Throughout the years, The Portuguese Tribune was recognized for its contribution towards the promotion of the Portuguese language and culture in the United States. In August 2021, the newspaper was recognized by the City of Angra do Heroísmo, Azores, Portugal with its Medal of Merit (Culture). In 2025, the publisher of the Portuguese Tribune, José B. Ávila, was recognized by the Portuguese Fraternal Society of America (PFSA) with the Portuguese Community Service Award, for his exemplary entrepreneurship and community leadership.

== Other Portuguese newspapers in California ==
The Portuguese Tribune was the 28th Portuguese newspaper to be founded in California since A Voz Portuguesa (Portuguese Voice) in 1884 in San Francisco. The Portuguese Tribune was the first Portuguese newspaper in California since the Capelinhos Volcano wave of immigration from the Azores Islands. Since then, others were established, but none other than The Portuguese Tribune has survived: Notícia (News) 1985–1986, Portugal-USA 1986–1987, Luso-Americano California 1992–1995, Portuguese-American Chronicle 1997–2006, and Lusitania News 2006. Even the old Jornal Portugues (Portuguese Journal), a merger of three earlier newspapers—O Imparcial (The Impartial) 1903–1932, Jornal de Noticias 1917–1932 (but previously O Arauto since 1896), and Colonia Portugueza (Portuguese Colony) 1924–1932) – ceased to exist in 1997 after over a century of publication.

== Causes ==
In the 1980s, The Portuguese Tribune sponsored an initiative to recognize former Portuguese Consul General in Bordeaux, France, Aristides de Sousa Mendes by the Portuguese Government. In the early 1990s, the newspaper became a voice for the East Timorese people in the Portuguese-American community in the US, institutions of higher learning, and political entities in Sacramento (state government), Washington, DC (federal government), and New York (United Nations). Since its foundation in 1979, The Portuguese Tribune has supported educational causes including the Portuguese Studies Programs at University of California, Berkeley and San Jose State University.
