= Little Portugal, San Jose =

Little Portugal
- Neighborhood of San Jose
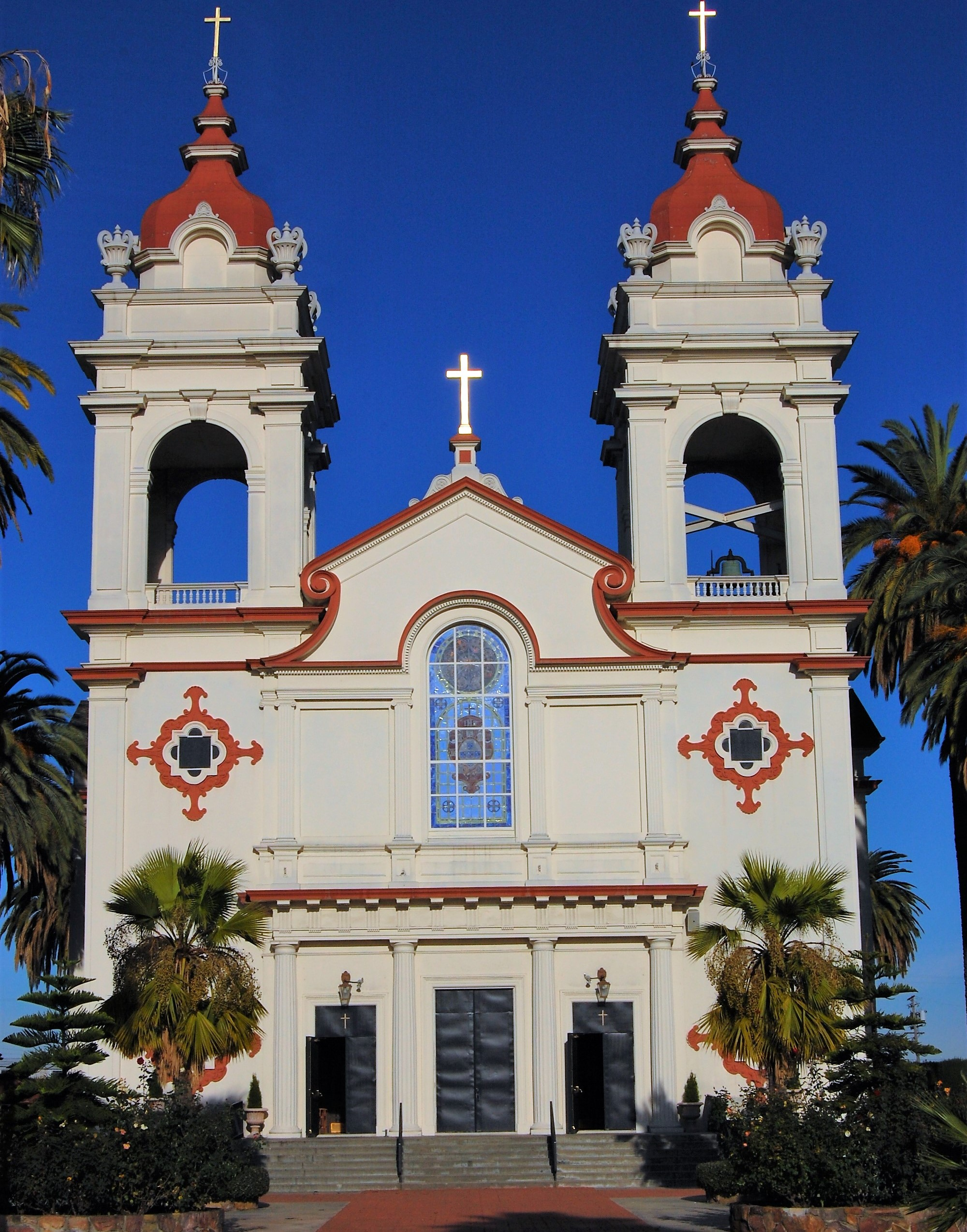
- Five Wounds Portuguese National Church

- Location within San Jose
- Coordinates: 37.35012°N 121.85768°W
- Country: United States
- State: California
- County: Santa Clara
- City: San Jose

Little Portugal is a historic neighborhood of San Jose, California, and historically the center of the local Portuguese-American community. Little Portugal is home to numerous Portuguese businesses, including Adega (San Jose's first restaurant to earn a Michelin star), numerous Portuguese social clubs, and the Five Wounds Portuguese National Church.

== History ==
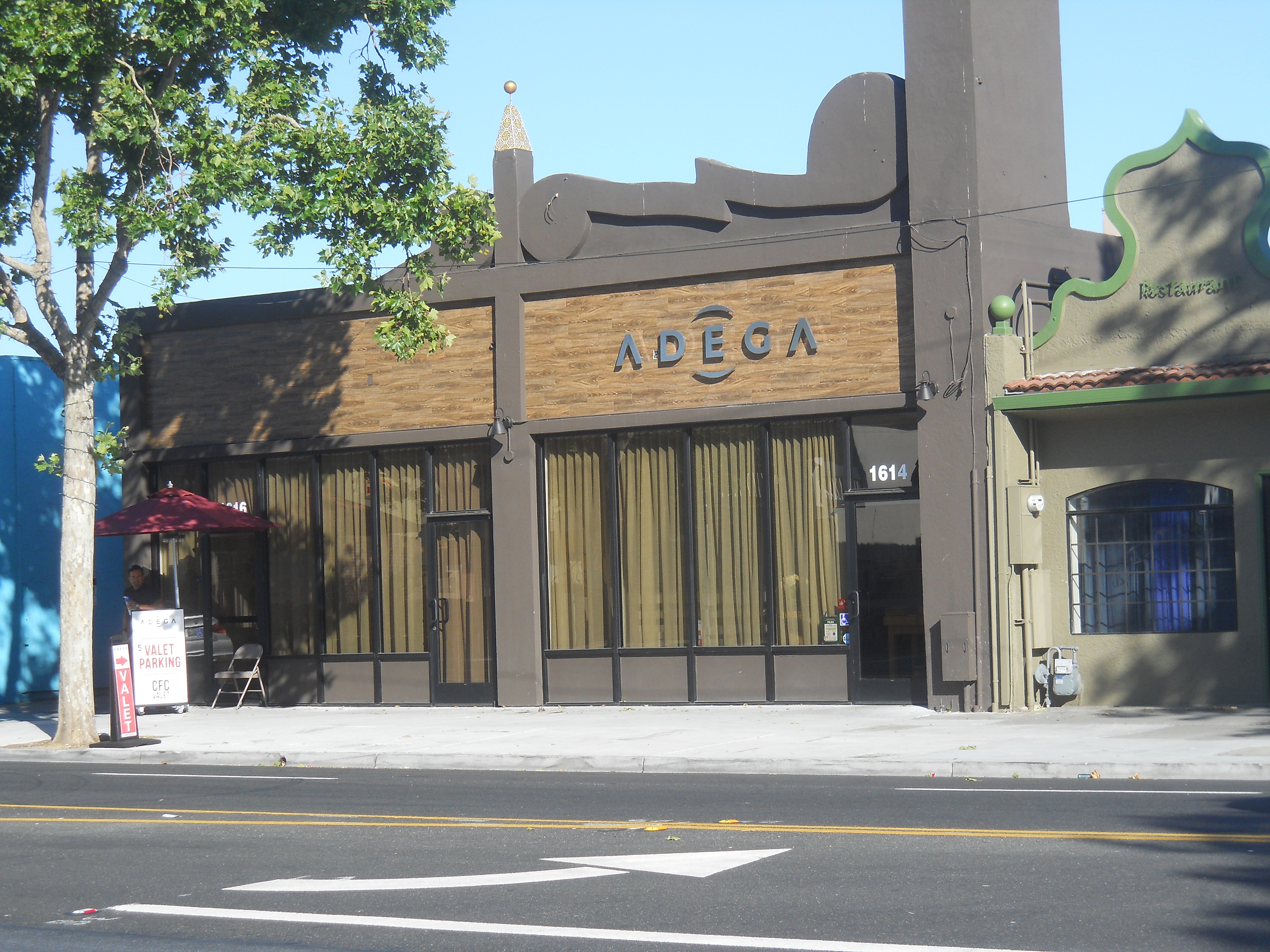
Portuguese bistro Adega was the city's first restaurant to be awarded a Michelin star.

Portuguese immigrants to California have historically come from the Azores, rather than from Mainland Portugal, and were traditionally farmers. Portuguese settlers came to the Santa Clara Valley beginning in the 1850s.

=== Development ===
In the mid-2010s, the Urban Displacement Project at the University of California, Berkeley cited it as one of the three neighborhoods in San Jose where low-income residents were most at risk of displacement by gentrification.

The proposed second phase of the Silicon Valley BART extension project would include an 28th Street/Little Portugal station behind Five Wounds Church. Two of the first urban villages proposed in the city's general plan for development until 2040 as a means of providing employment and low-cost housing are to be in the neighborhood, one on Alum Rock Avenue.

== Portuguese community ==
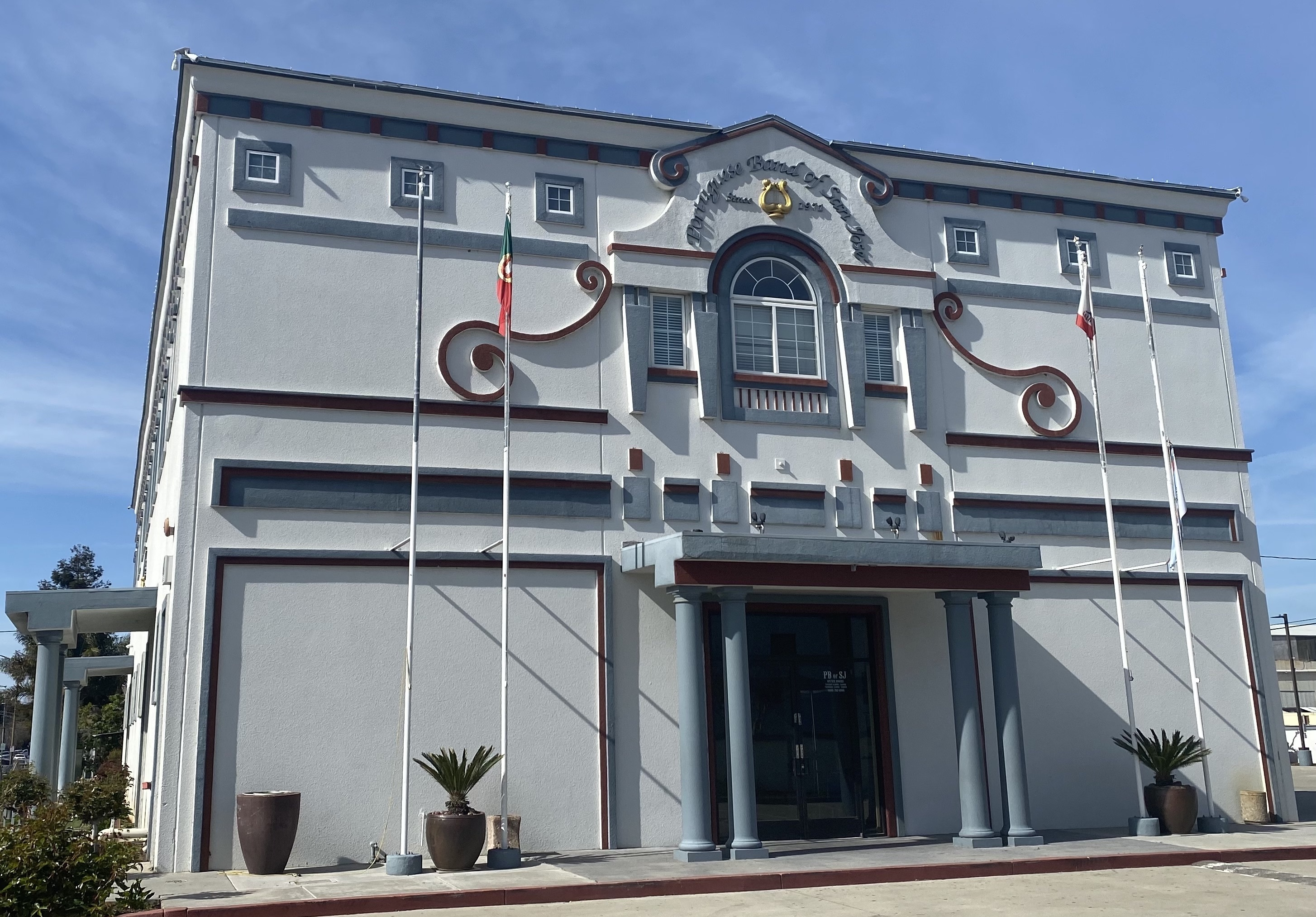
Portuguese Band of San José

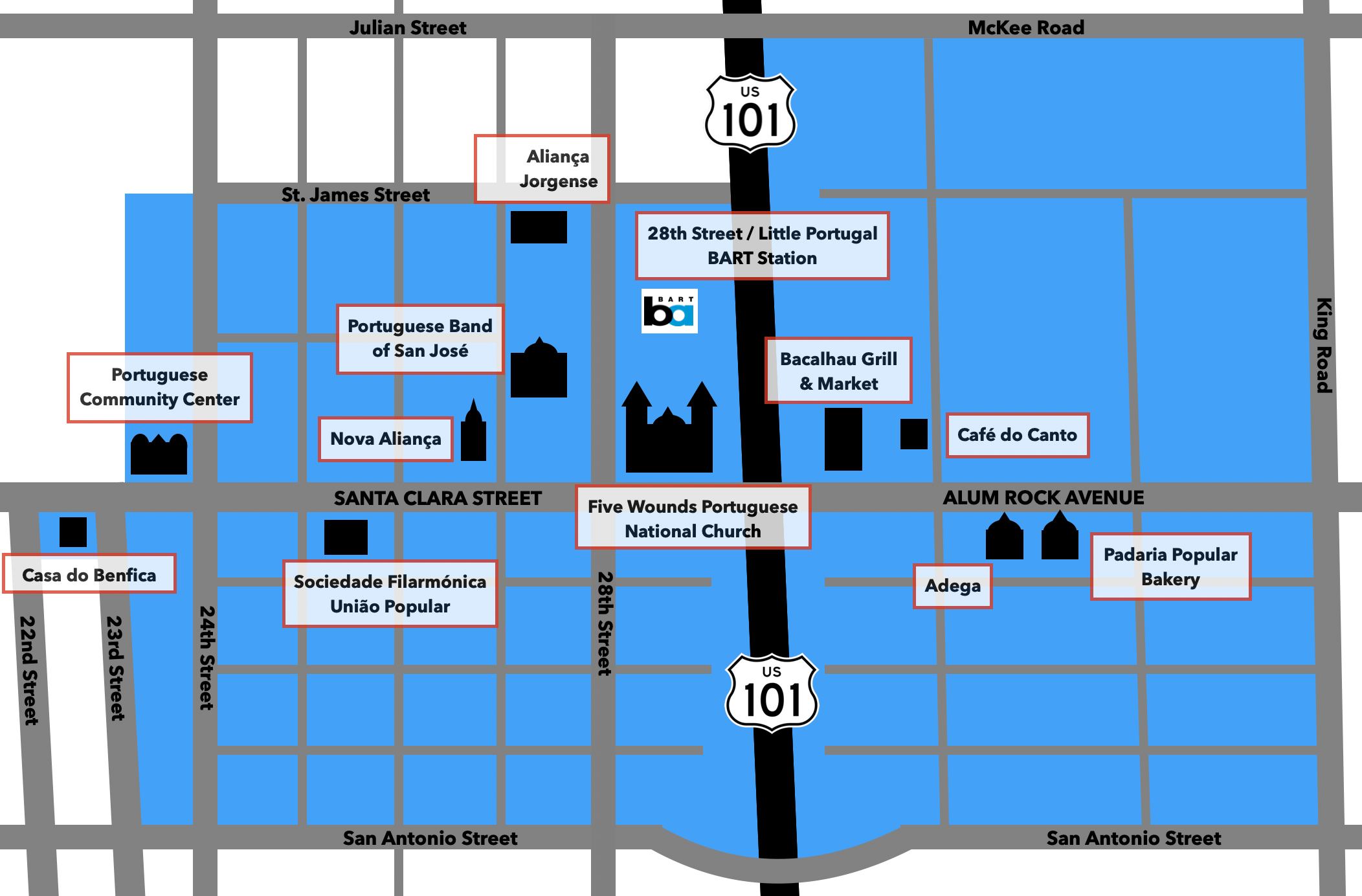
Map of Little Portugal.

Little Portugal includes a number of Portuguese American social organizations, including Aliança Jorgense, Casa do Benfica, Centro Leonino da Califórnia, IES Hall, the Portuguese Band of San José (the oldest surviving Portuguese marching band in California), Sociedade Filarmónica União Popular, local sport clubs such as the Portuguese Athletic Club, the Portuguese Association for Social Services and Opportunities (POSSO), a neighborhood social services agency founded in 1974, and a business association.

Long-time Portuguese businesses in the neighborhood have included: Bacalhau Grill & Trade Rite Market; Café do Canto; Casanova Imports; Five Star Bakery; Foto Christiano; Furtado's Jewelers, now closed; KSQQ radio, one of three radio stations owned by Batista Vieira, now multi-lingual; L & F Fish Market; Silva Sausage; Popular Bakery or Padaria Popular; Vieira Painting; and Sousa's restaurant.

The Portuguese Historical Museum in San Jose's History Park is a replica of the city's original Portuguese império (chapel) that preceded the building of Five Wounds Church. Portuguese Heritage Publications of California is headquartered in the Berryessa district.

Adega, open since 2015, is the second Portuguese restaurant in the US to win a Michelin star and San Jose's first Michelin-starred restaurant.

== Geography ==
Little Portugal is centered along the point where Santa Clara Street becomes Alum Rock Ave, roughly between 23rd Street and 34th Street. and extending into the Anne Darling neighborhood.

== Gallery ==
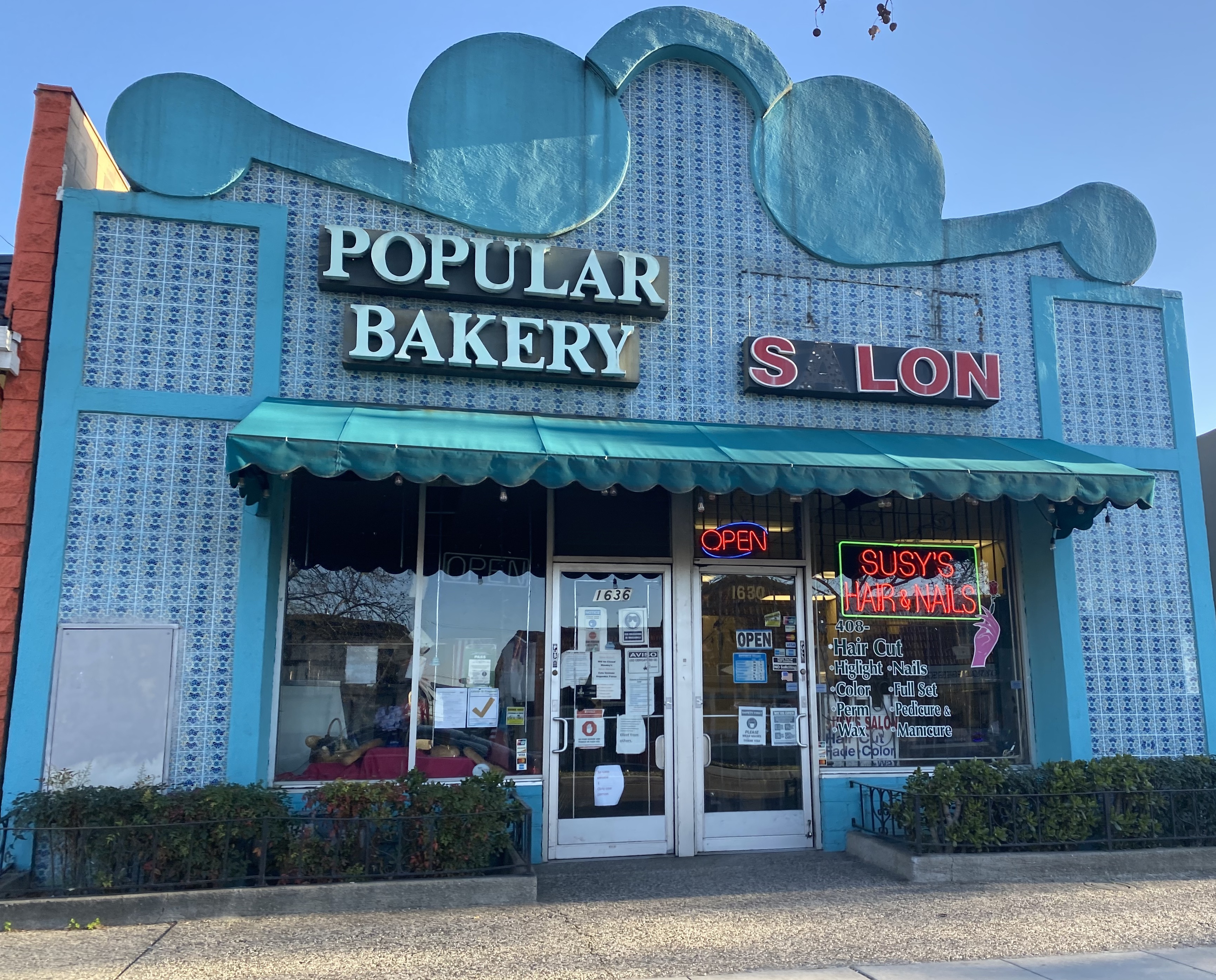
The historic Popular Portuguese Bakery

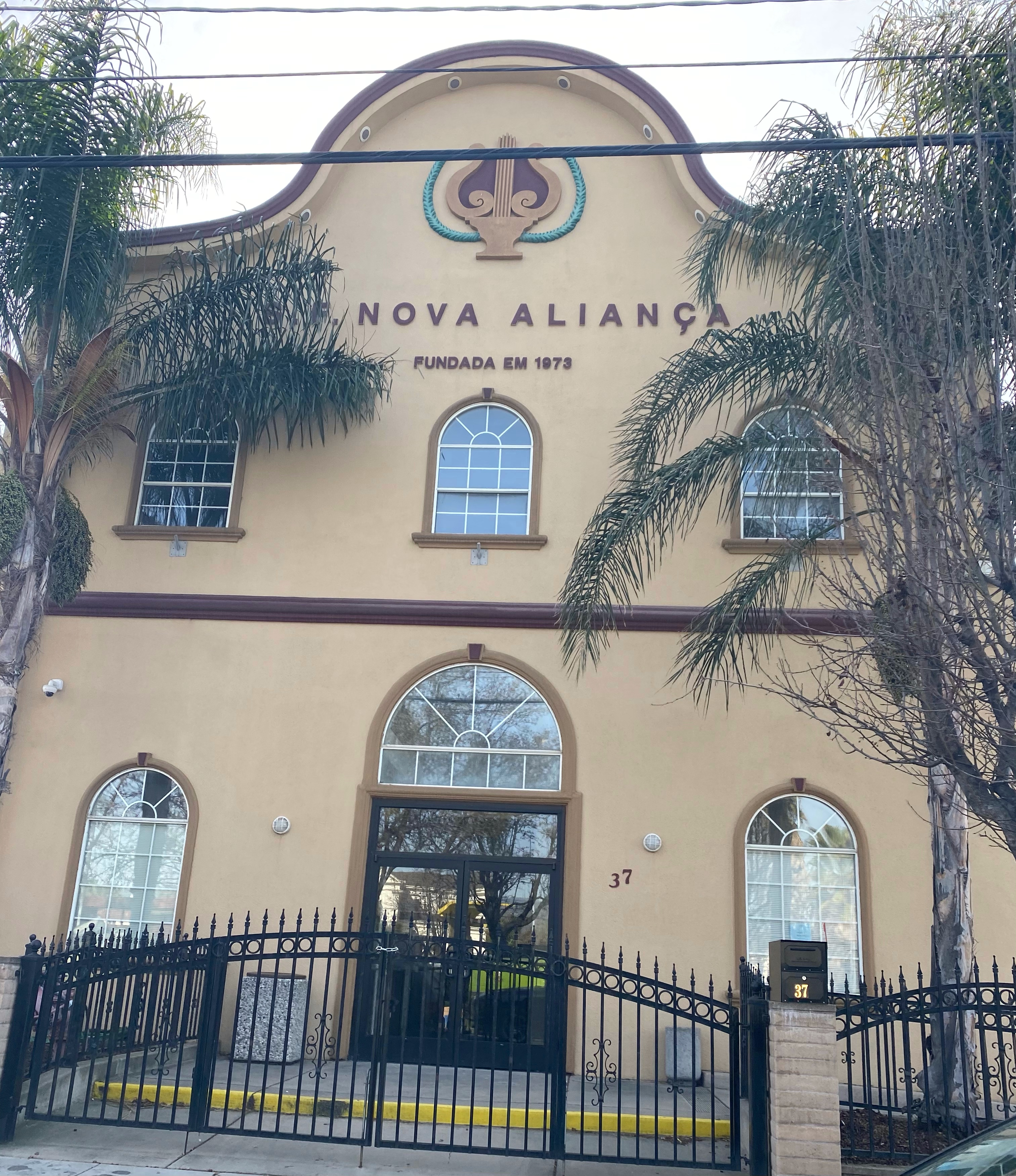
S.F. Nova Aliança

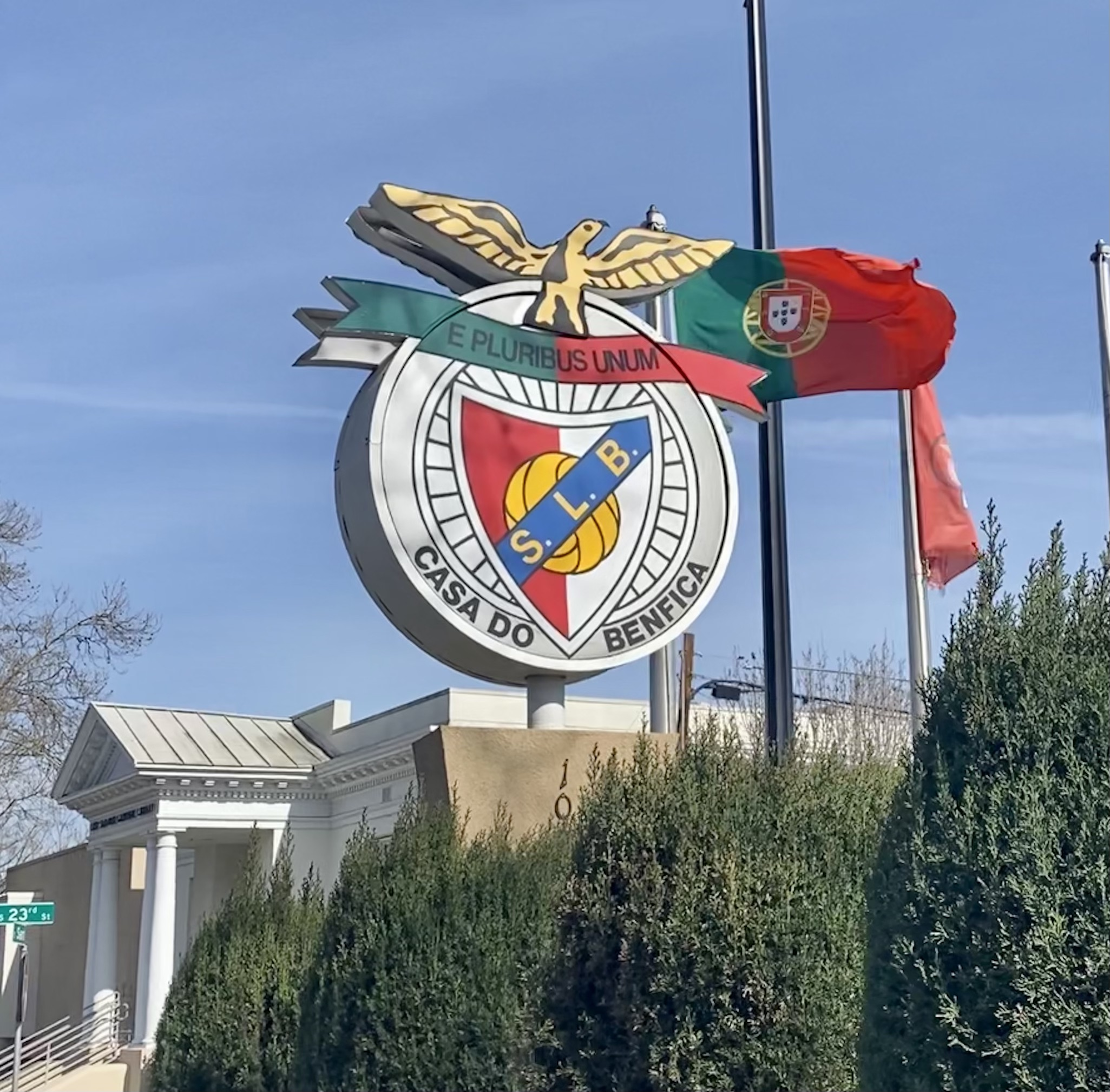
Casa do Benfica

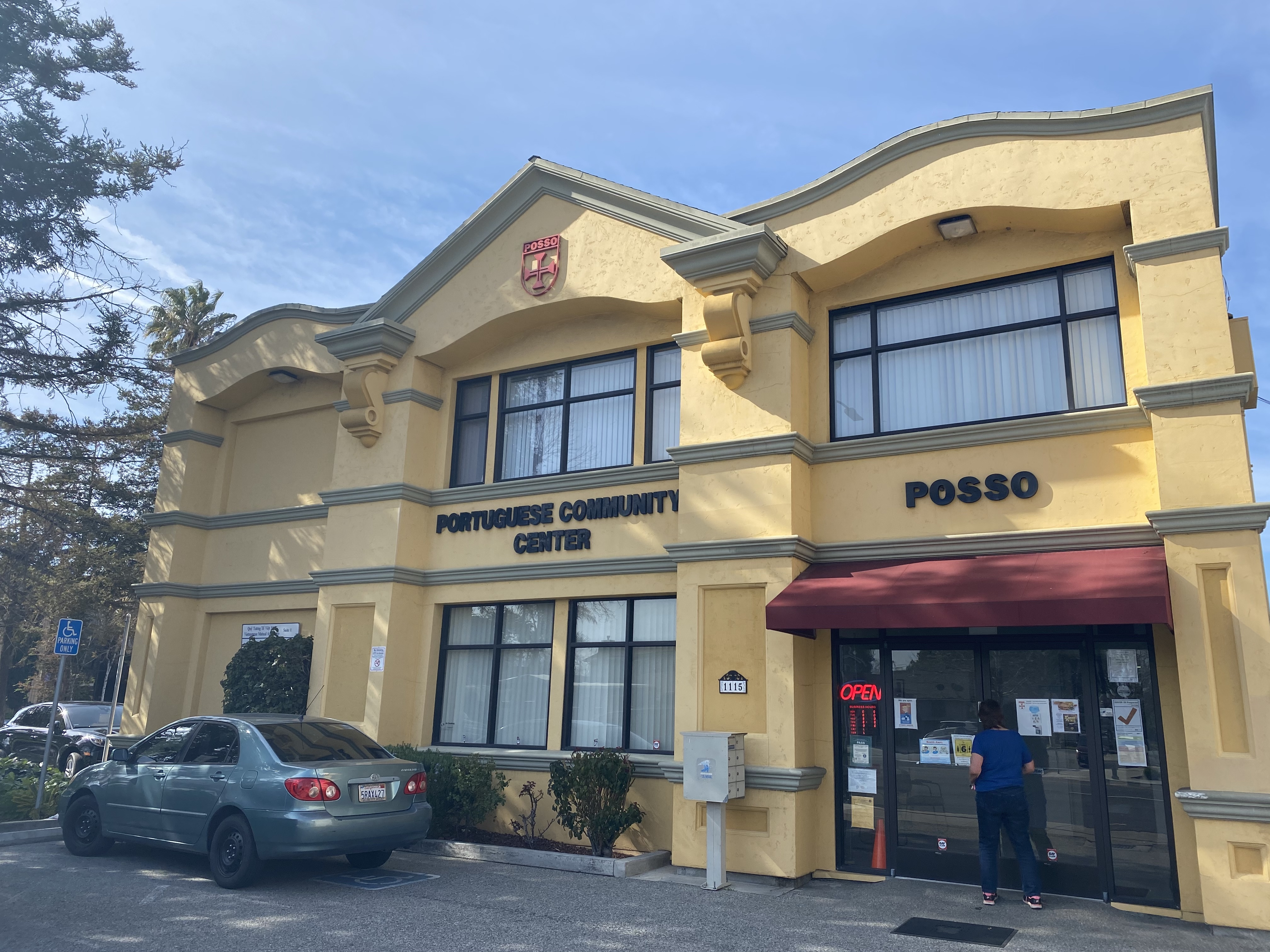
Portuguese Community Center

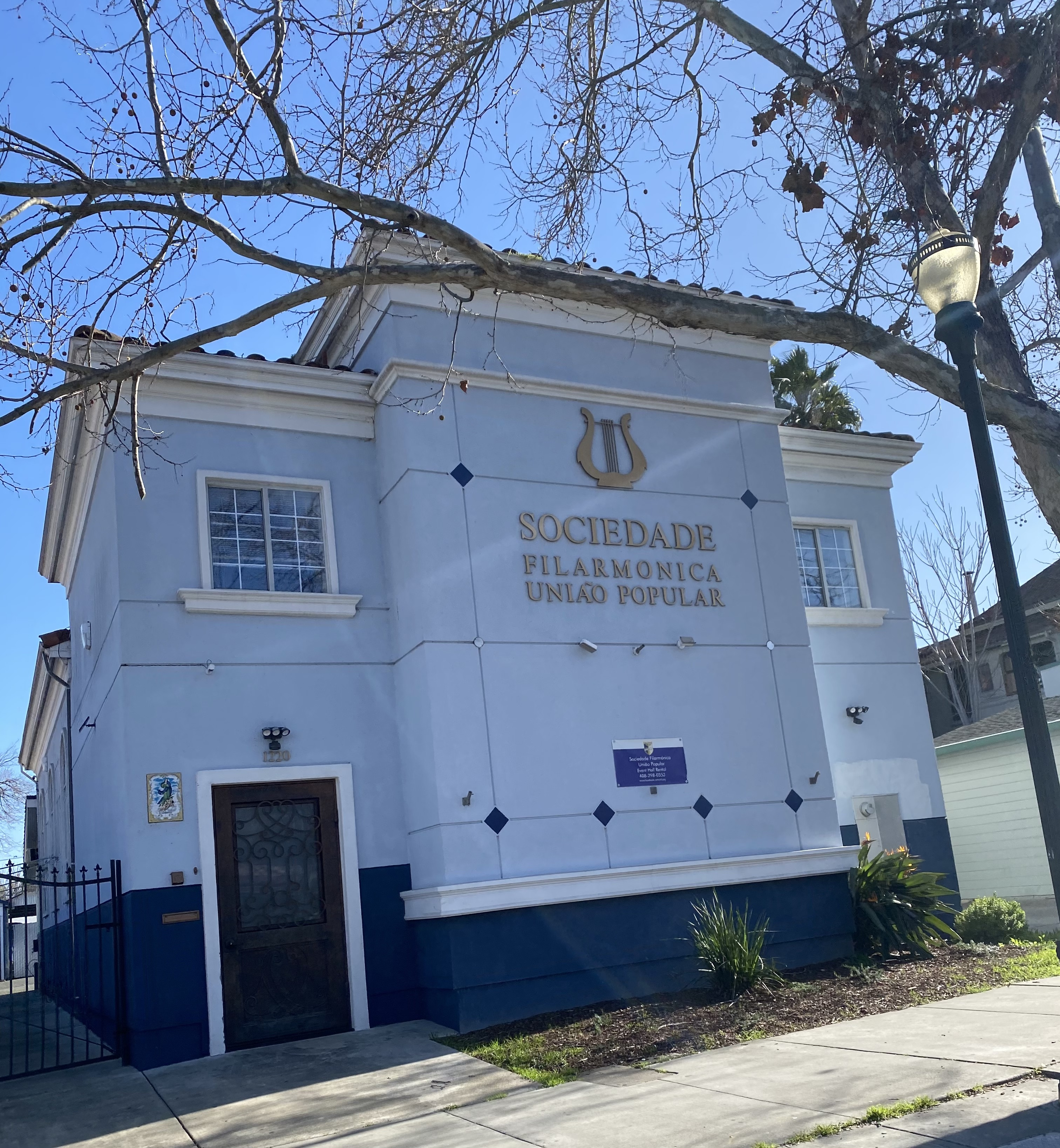
Sociedade Filarmónica União Popular

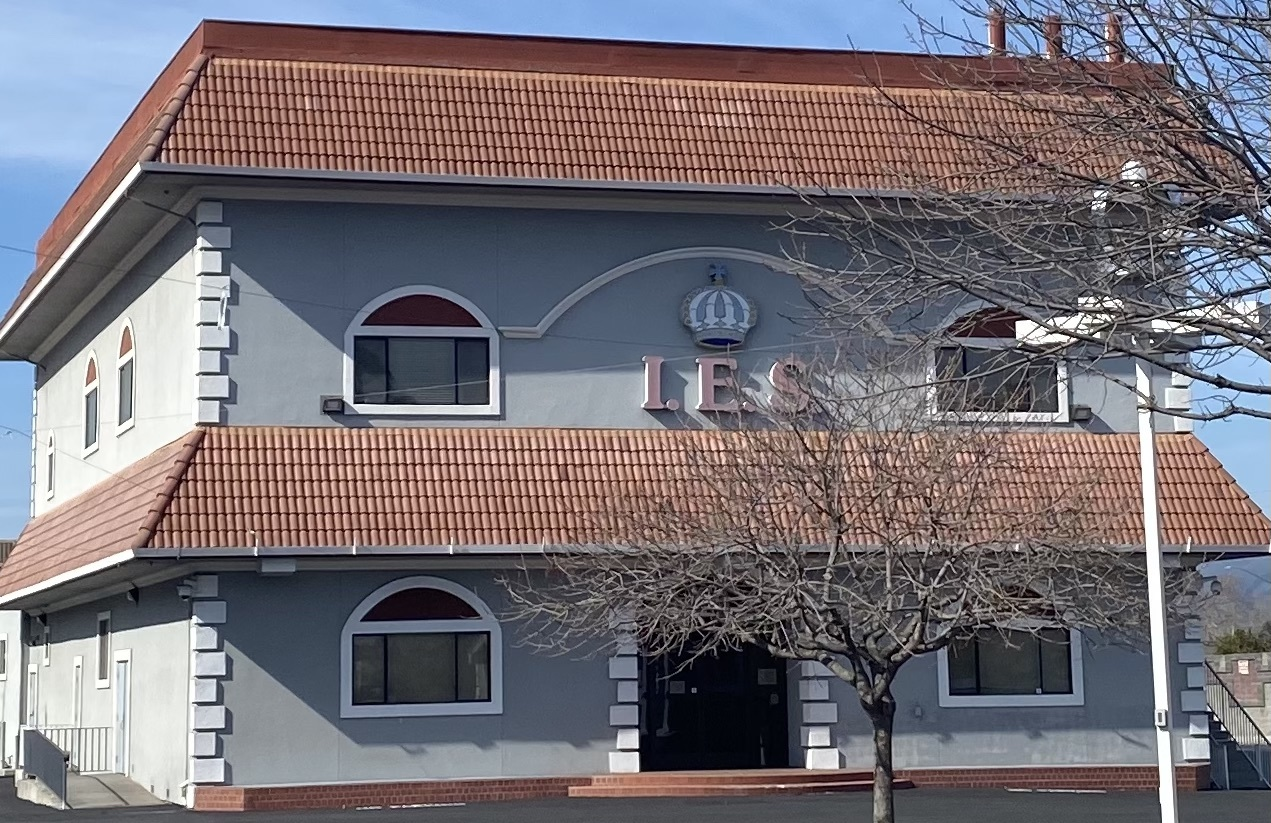
Irmandade do Espírito Santo

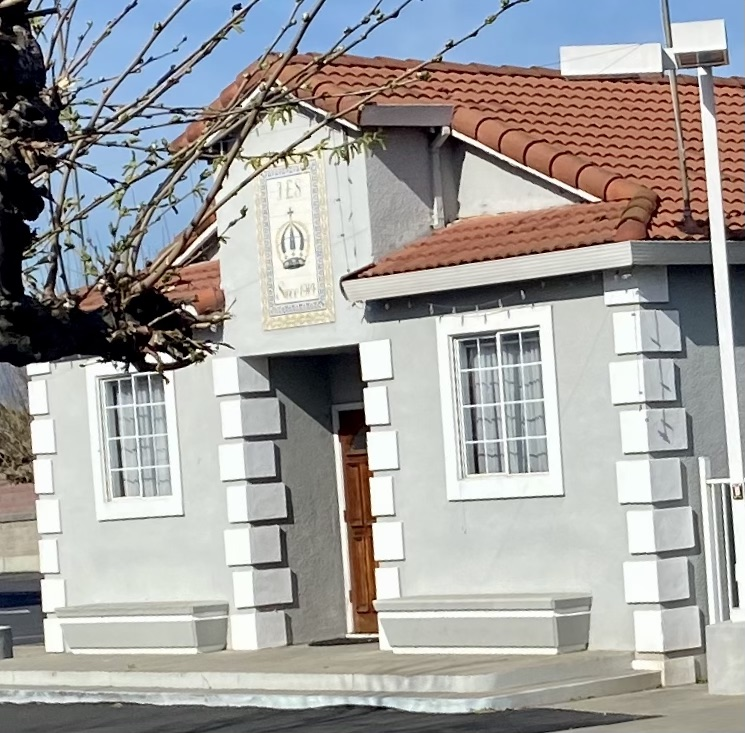
Império do Espírito Santo

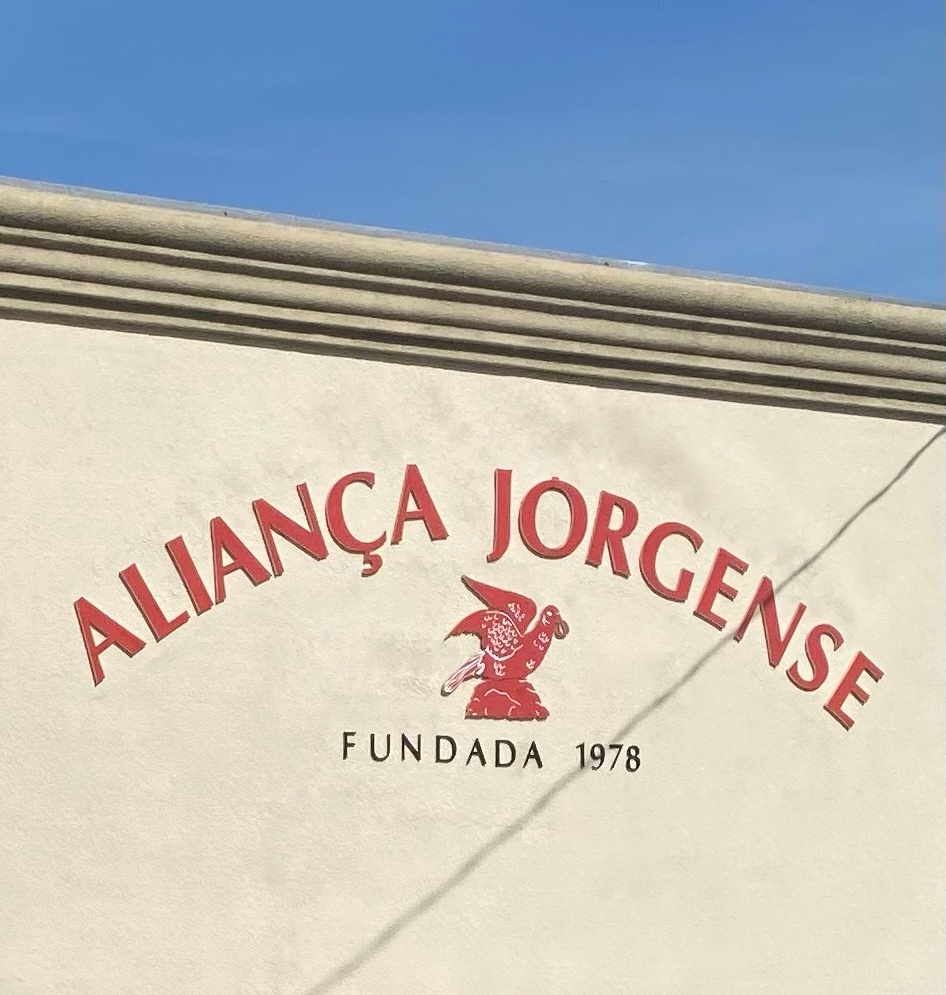
Aliança Jorgense
