= KLBS =

Radio station in Los Banos, California

- Los Banos, California; United States
- Broadcast area: San Joaquin Valley
- Frequency: 1330 kHz
- Branding: The Portuguese Radio Network

Programming
- Language: Portuguese
- Format: World Ethnic

Ownership
- Owner: Ethnic Radio of Los Banos, Inc.
- Sister stations: KSQQ

History
- First air date: May 1, 1961
- Call sign meaning: Los Banos

Technical information
- Licensing authority: FCC
- Facility ID: 19801
- Class: B
- Power: 420 watts (day); 5,000 watts (night)
- Transmitter coordinates: 37°05′50.8″N 120°49′54.7″W

Links
- Public license information: Public file; LMS
- Webcast: Listen live
- Website: klbs.com

KLBS (1330 AM) is a radio station licensed to Los Banos, California, United States. The station, established in 1961, is currently owned by Ethnic Radio of Los Banos, Inc.

== Programming ==
KLBS broadcasts a Portuguese-language world music format featuring Portuguese-language news and community information as part of The Portuguese Radio Network. KLBS and its sister station, KSQQ, serve the large Portuguese community of California's San Joaquin Valley.

== History ==
=== The beginning ===
This station began licensed broadcasting on May 1, 1961, with 500 watts of power on the frequency 1330 kHz, restricted to daytime-only operation. The station was assigned the KLBS call sign by the Federal Communications Commission.

Under the leadership of company president James Rose, license holder Los Banos Broadcasting Company served the diverse local population by including eight hours of farm programming, five hours of Spanish language programming, and seven hours of Portuguese language programming each week. The Portuguese programming included a weekday morning show from 7:00 to 8:00 a.m. and a Sunday afternoon block from noon to 2:00 p.m.

=== New ownership ===
John R. McAdam acquired Los Banos Broadcasting Company in 1963. McAdam expanded the ethnic programming to as much as 12 hours of Spanish language and 16 hours of Portuguese language programming each week throughout the 1970s.

In April 1982, McAdam and Los Banos Broadcasting Company reached an agreement to transfer ownership of KLBS to a new company called Ethnic Radio, Inc. The deal was approved by the FCC on May 25, 1982.

=== 24-hour broadcasting ===
KLBS filed an application with the FCC in November 1985 to begin operating around the clock by adding nighttime service with 5,000 watts of power. The FCC granted authorization for this major change on February 24, 1986, and tower installation began in June 1986. Construction was completed in November 1986 and the station was issued a license to cover the changes on December 3, 1987.

=== KLBS today ===
Ethnic Radio, Inc., applied in June 1987 to assign the KLBS broadcast license to the Vieira family's Ethnic Radio of Los Banos, Inc. The transfer was approved by the FCC on July 2, 1987, and the transaction was consummated the same day. Broadcasting 90% of its programming in Portuguese, KLBS was then the only radio station in California broadcasting predominantly in the Portuguese language. That would change in 1990 when sister station KSQQ signed on with a multi-ethnic format, broadcasting in a dozen languages but with Portuguese language programming taking the bulk of the station's time.
