= Five Wounds Portuguese National Church =

Church in San Jose, California

- Igreja Nacional Portuguesa das Cinco Chagas
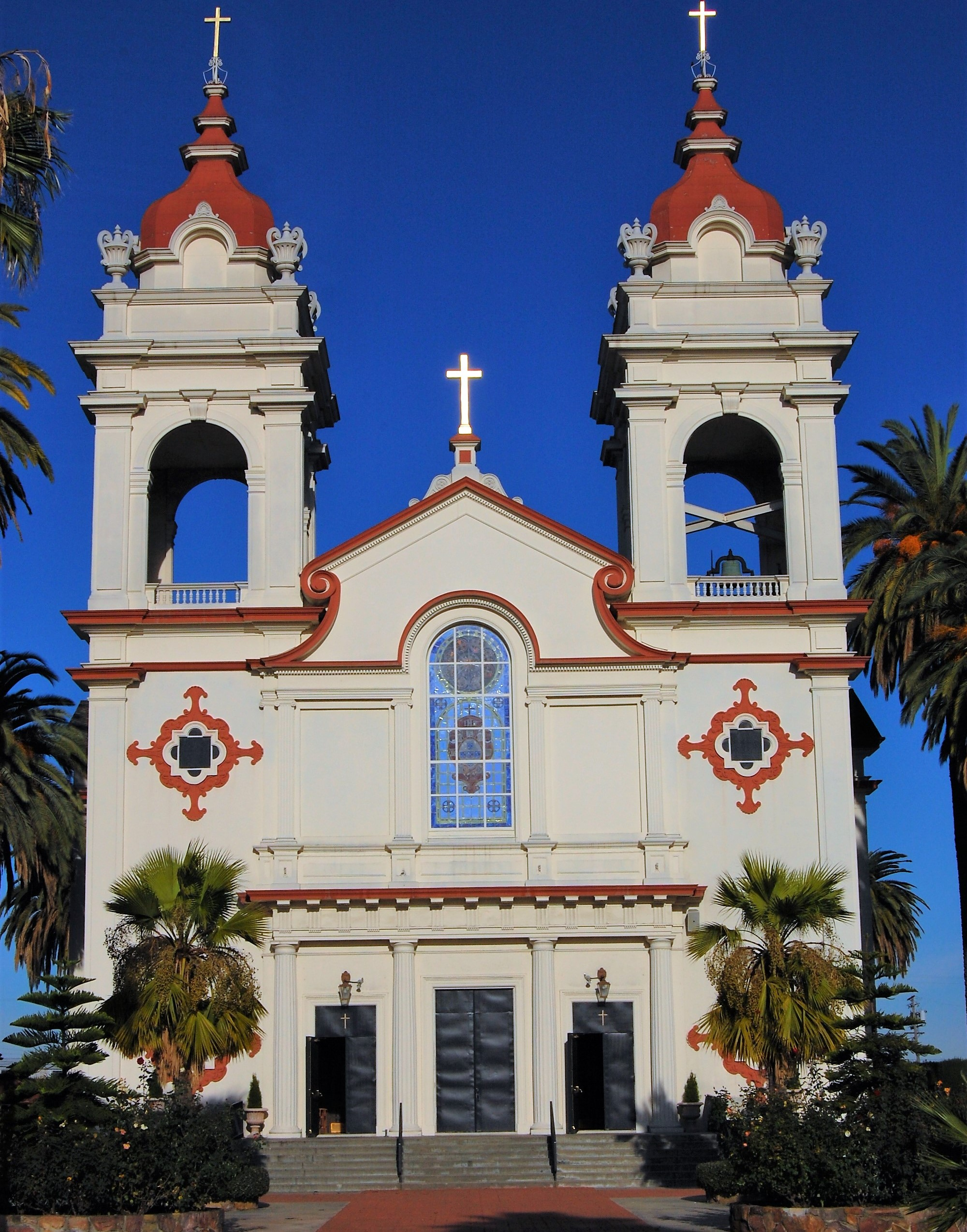

- Location within San Jose, California
- 37°21′00″N 121°51′50″W
- Location: 1375 East Santa Clara Street; San Jose, California
- Country: USA
- Denomination: Latin Catholic
- Website: www.fivewoundschurch.org

History
- Status: Parish church
- Founded: November 8, 1914
- Dedication: Five Wounds of Jesus

Architecture
- Functional status: Active

Administration
- Province: Ecclesiastical province of San Francisco
- Archdiocese: San Francisco
- Diocese: San Jose in California
- Deanery: Deanery 6

Clergy
- Bishop: Oscar Cantú
- Pastor: Manuel Pato

Five Wounds Portuguese National Church (Portuguese: Igreja Nacional Portuguesa das Cinco Chagas) is a Latin Catholic parish church of the Catholic Church in San Jose, California, in the Little Portugal neighborhood of East San Jose. The church was founded on November 8, 1914.

The parish and its church are under the jurisdiction of the Diocese of San Jose in California and its bishop, Oscar Cantú.

== History ==
Its name is derived from the Five Holy Wounds (Portuguese: Cinco Chagas) -- the five piercing wounds that Jesus Christ suffered during his crucifixion.

Located at 1375 East Santa Clara Street in San Jose (just off U.S. Highway 101), the Portuguese National Church of Five Wounds are the heart and soul of Little Portugal. On November 16, 1913, Portuguese residents of San Jose purchased the land that became the site of Five Wounds. However, it was not until 1914 that the parish was created. In collaboration with Mr. Manuel Teixeira de Frietas, the Portuguese community asked Archbishop Patrick Riordan for the blessing to build a church. The blessing was given and in 1914 “we opened the house that today is the parish residence and the first bazaar in benefit of the church.” But in 1915, through a petition signed by the Portuguese residence of San Jose, the Archdiocese of San Francisco officially approved the parish as the National Church of Portuguese of Five Wounds. Timber and wood from the Portuguese Pavilion that was in display in the Panama Pacific International Exposition in San Francisco in 1915 was used to build the church. The building material, which was brought over from Portugal to build the Portuguese Pavilion, was transported by wagon through the Camino Real. On the 15th of November “Msgr. Henrique A. Ribeiro celebrated the first mass as pastor of the new parish.”
