= Adega =

Restaurant in San Jose, California, U.S.

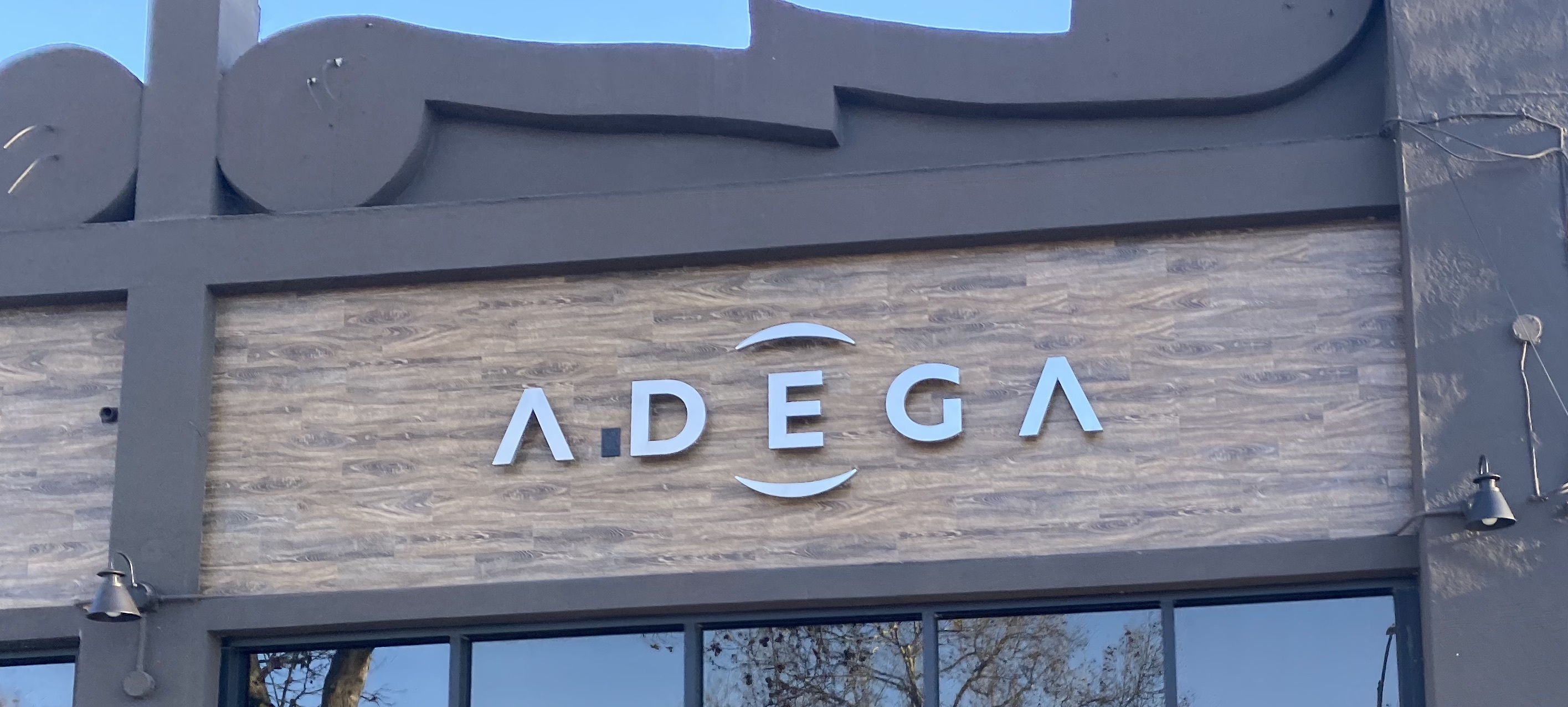

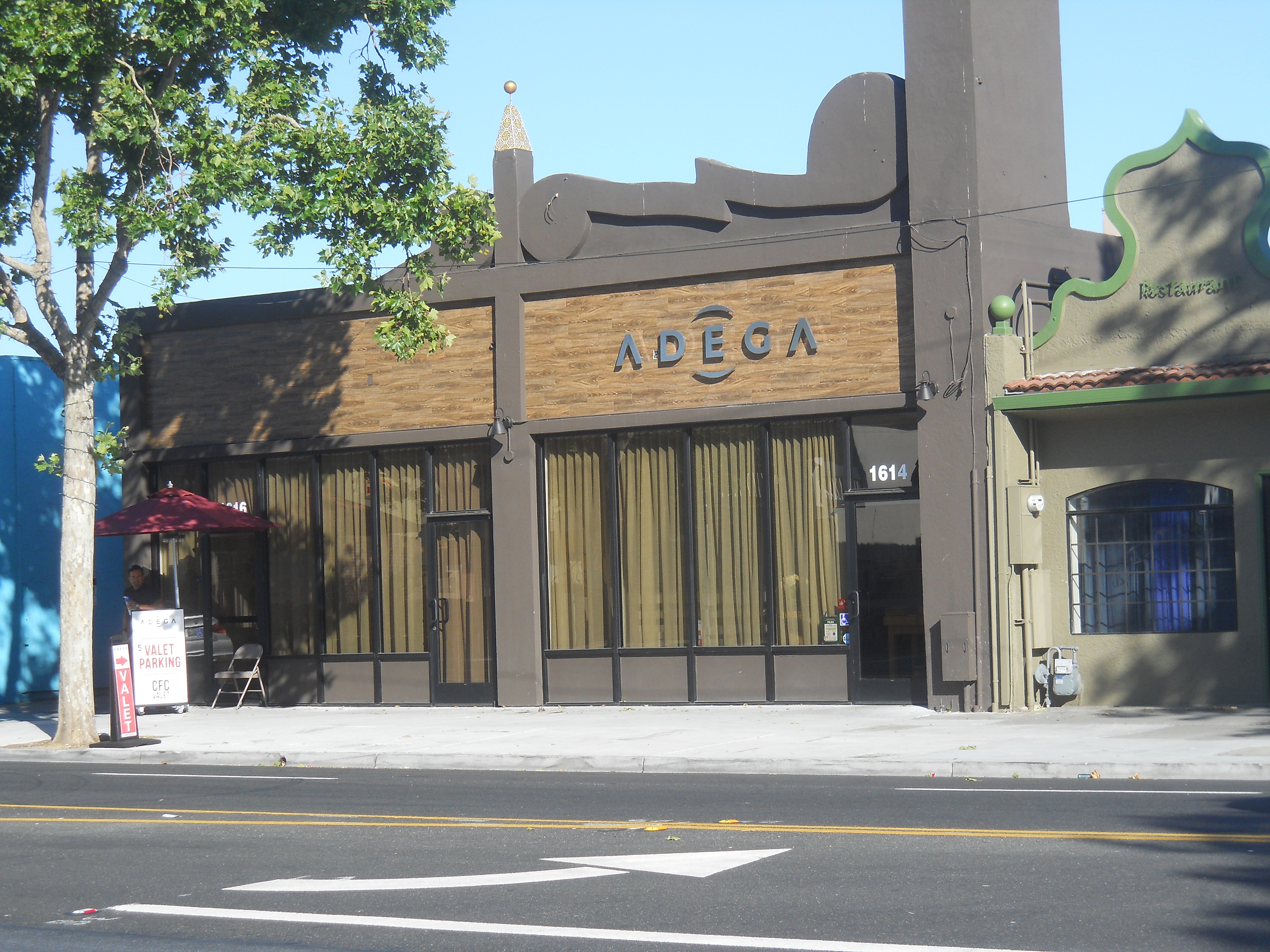
- Restaurant's exterior in 2017
- Interactive map of Adega

Restaurant information
- Established: 2015
- Owners: Carlos and Fernanda Carreira
- Head chef: Jessica Carreira; David Costa
- Pastry chef: Jessica Carreira
- Food type: Portuguese
- Location: 1614 Alum Rock Avenue, San Jose, California, United States
- Coordinates: 37°21′04″N 121°51′30″W
- Website: www.adegarest.com

Adega is a Portuguese restaurant in the Little Portugal neighborhood of San Jose, California, United States. Established in 2015, it became the first restaurant in San Jose to be awarded a Michelin star, earning one star in 2016. It closed in late 2023 and was replaced by a second location of Petiscos, a more casual Portuguese restaurant with the same chefs, but reopened in late 2024. The owners also opened a patisserie, Pasteleria Adega, in 2019; in November 2026, this is to become a pop-up within the restaurant.

== History ==
Adega (Portuguese for "wine cellar") opened in late 2015 as a cafe. It is located in the Little Portugal neighborhood of San Jose, and replaced Sousa's, also a Portuguese restaurant, which had occupied the building for 33 years.

Adega is owned by Carlos and Fernanda Carreira, who are wine importers and local residents; the chefs are their daughter Jessica Carreira, a patissier, and her business partner David Costa, who met while working at Eleven, a two Michelin star restaurant in Lisbon. The Carreiras bought the former Sousa's in their daughter's name.

In July 2023, the owners announced that Adega would close in December 2023 and be replaced by a second location of its casual spin-off restaurant, Petiscos. Adega reopened in November 2024.

== Reception ==
In October 2016, Adega was awarded a Michelin star, the first for a restaurant in San Jose and the second for a Portuguese restaurant in the US; Carreira, then 23 years old, is also one of the youngest chefs to receive the award, and one of few women.

The restaurant retained its star in 2017 but lost it in 2018. It regained it in 2021, but lost it once more in 2023 and has not been awarded a star since its closure and reopening.

=== Spin-off restaurants ===
The owners of Adega opened Petiscos, a casual restaurant offering small plates, in the SoFA District of San Jose in November 2020. Petiscos was added to the Michelin Guide in 2023 and subsequently to the Bib Gourmand list. As of September 2025 Sandra Murillo is the head chef at Petiscos, with pastries by Jessica Carreira.

Pasteleria Adega, a Portuguese bakery also with pastries by Jessica Carreira, started as a Saturday pop-up within Adega. In November 2019, it opened as a bakery and café on Santa Clara Street in Downtown San Jose, and in the mid-2020s, it expanded to farmers markets in San Jose and Walnut Creek. In November 2026, the owners announced that the downtown location presented parking and other problems, and the cafe will close in late November, reopening as a pop-up and weekend brunch location at the restaurant on November 28.

== See also ==
- List of Michelin-starred restaurants in California
