= KSQQ =

- Morgan Hill, California; United States
- Broadcast area: Santa Clara Valley
- Frequency: 96.1 MHz
- Branding: Q96

Programming
- Languages: Portuguese, Mandarin Chinese
- Format: World Ethnic

Ownership
- Owner: Coyote Communications, Inc.
- Sister stations: KLBS

History
- First air date: September 5, 1991

Technical information
- Licensing authority: FCC
- Facility ID: 14247
- Class: A
- ERP: 4,700 watts
- HAAT: 49 meters (161 ft)
- Transmitter coordinates: 37°11′1″N 121°48′9″W
- Translator: 103.3 K277BN (San Martin)

Links
- Public license information: Public file; LMS
- Webcast: Listen live
- Website: ksqq.com

KSQQ (96.1 FM) is a world ethnic radio station licensed to Morgan Hill, California, United States, broadcasting in the Chinese and Portuguese languages. The station is owned by Coyote Communications and serves the greater San Francisco Bay Area from North Santa Clara County to Marin County. Its studios are in San Jose, and it has a transmitter site just south of the city limits. Programming is also relayed over low-power FM translator, K277BN, in San Martin, California.

As the Sunol Grade is reached, KYMX, an adult contemporary station from the Central Valley cuts off KSQQ's signal almost completely. The signal has difficulty reaching the Tri-Valley area because of rough terrain.

KSQQ was first licensed on September 5, 1991.

== Additional frequencies ==
In addition to the main station, KSQQ is relayed by these stations and translators to widen its broadcast area.

Call sign	Frequency	City of license	FID	ERP (W)	Class	FCC info
K277BN	103.3 FM	San Martin, California	147433	23	D	LMS
