= The Paramount, San Francisco =

Residential apartments in California, US

The Paramount
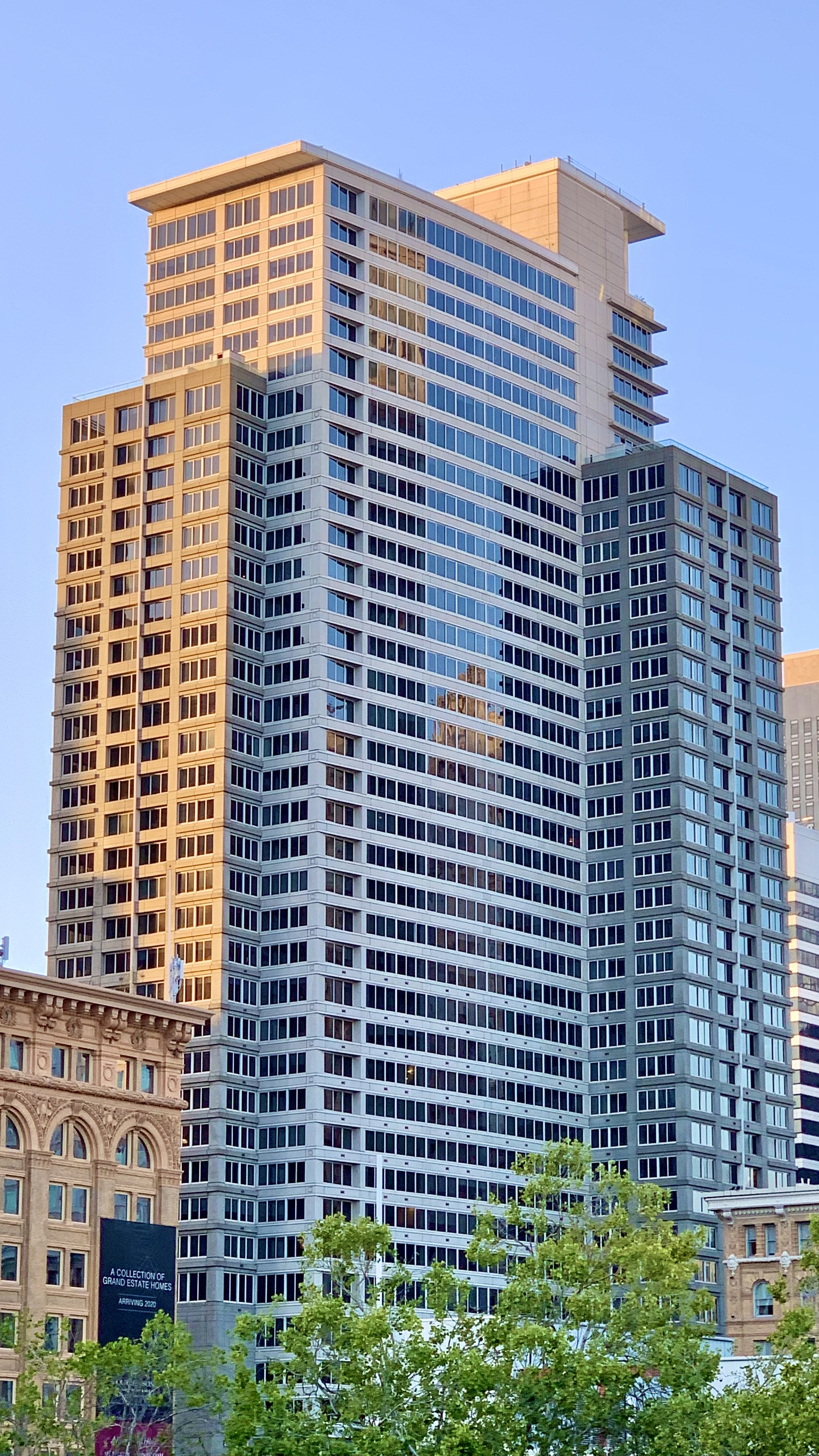
- View from Yerba Buena Gardens in 2021

- Location within San Francisco The Paramount, San Francisco (California) The Paramount, San Francisco (the United States)

General information
- Status: Completed
- Type: Residential apartments
- Location: 680 Mission Street; San Francisco, California
- Coordinates: 37°47′12.0″N 122°24′07.0″W
- Construction started: 2000
- Opening: 2002

Height
- Roof: 420 ft (130 m)

Technical details
- Floor count: 40
- Floor area: 660,000 sq ft (61,320 m^{2})

Design and construction
- Architects: Kwan Henmi Architecture/Planning, Inc.
- Structural engineer: Englekirk Structural Engineers
- Main contractor: Charles Pankow Builders

Other information
- Number of units: 495

The Paramount, or 680 Mission Street at Third, is a 40-story rental-apartment tower that is located South of Market just outside the Financial District on Mission Street in San Francisco.

== History ==
Construction of the 420-foot (128-m) tower was completed in 2001. Upon completion, the building was the tallest concrete-framed structure located in Seismic Zone 4. It was also the tallest all-residential building in San Francisco from 2001 to 2008.

The Paramount is one of several new highrise projects completed or under construction on Mission Street since 2000. Other examples include 555 Mission Street, St. Regis Museum Tower, Millennium Tower, 101 Second Street, and the JP MorganChase Building.

UC Santa Cruz chancellor Denice Denton leapt to her death from the roof on 24 June 2006.

== See also ==
- List of tallest buildings in San Francisco
