= 535 Mission Street =

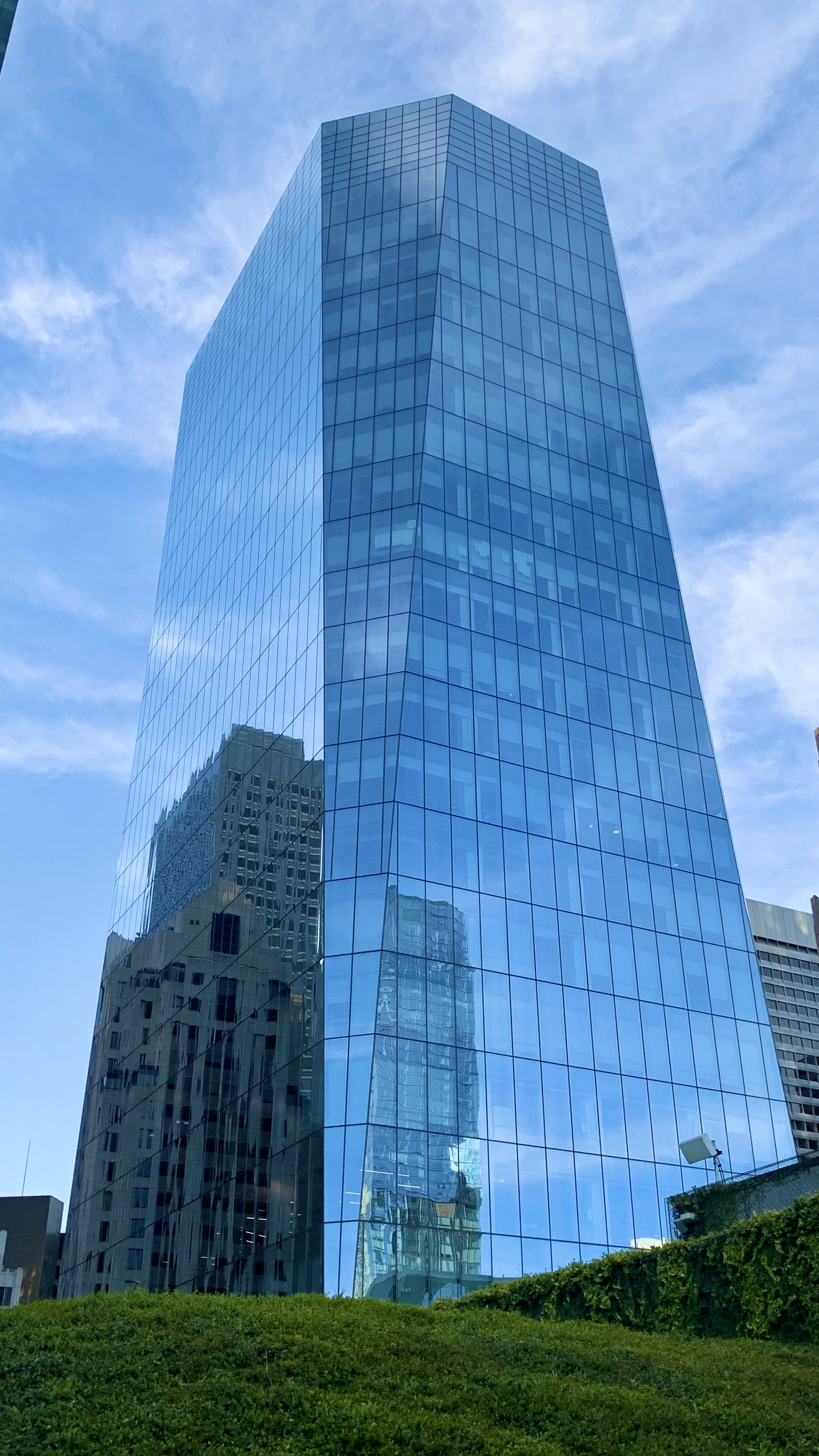
- View from Salesforce Park in 2021

- Location within San Francisco 535 Mission Street (California) 535 Mission Street (the United States)

General information
- Type: Commercial offices
- Architectural style: Modernism
- Location: 535 Mission Street; San Francisco, California
- Coordinates: 37.788866°N 122.39821°W
- Construction started: 2008
- Completed: 2014
- Cost: US$215 million

Height
- Roof: 378 ft (115 m)

Technical details
- Floor count: 27
- Floor area: 307,000 sq ft (29,000 m^{2})

Design and construction
- Architect: HOK
- Developer: Boston Properties, Inc.
- Main contractor: Swinerton

535 Mission Street is an office skyscraper in the South of Market district of San Francisco, California, that opened in November 2014, with 27 stories rising 378 ft (115 m) above street level. It is adjacent to the Transbay Transit Center site and located on the same block as 100 First Plaza, 555 Mission Street, and 101 Second Street.

== History ==
In 1984, a partnership called Bredero-Northern filed an application for a 300 foot (91 m) tall, 23-story office building. The Environmental Impact Report was certified in 1986, but the project was subsequently withdrawn by the developers and never built. In 1999, a new sponsor called DWI Development, Inc. proposed a 22-story, approximately 294 foot (90 m) tall building, which was approved in April 2000. Following the dot-com crash, Hines Interests Limited Partnership took over the project and in 2002 demolished the existing structures and built a temporary parking lot until the economy recovered.

With the office market slow to recover, the site was sold in 2003 to Monahan Pacific for $19.2 million, with plans to switch the development to condominiums. In 2005, the site was approved for a 35-story, 360 foot (110 m) tall building containing up to 273 housing units. However, by 2006, citing an "overheated" residential real estate market, Monahan Pacific sold the development site to Beacon Capital Partners for $30 million, who changed the plans back to offices.

Beacon broke ground on 535 Mission during the summer of 2008, driving piles and laying the building's foundation. In October 2008, during the 2008 financial crisis, construction on the building was halted. After lying dormant for four years, the site was sold along with already purchased construction materials to Boston Properties for $71 million. Boston Properties restarted construction in 2013. Topping-out ceremonies were held on January 8, 2014 and the building opened in November 2014. The building was planned to attain LEED Gold status upon completion.

The building was designed by HOK, the American architecture firm. The 535 Mission Project in San Francisco features a 4 sided SSG Facade installed by Architectural Glass and Aluminum. San Francisco Chronicle architecture critic John King stated that 535 Mission Street "isn’t a masterpiece", but praised its architectural restraint, with an "unusual but understated form [that] is emphasized by the sleek glass skin, where sometimes, especially near dusk or dawn, each side reads as a single blue or silver pane."

As of 2014, one third of the building's space was occupied by Trulia, a real estate website company. In February 2023, however, Trulia announced that it had reduced its footprint in the building from six floors to two. In December 2014, the coworking space company WeWork announced that it would lease 91,000 square feet in the tower. As of May 2025, WeWork's website states that its working space occupies seven of the building's 27 floors.

== See also ==
- List of tallest buildings in San Francisco
