= 555 Mission Street =

Skyscraper in San Francisco

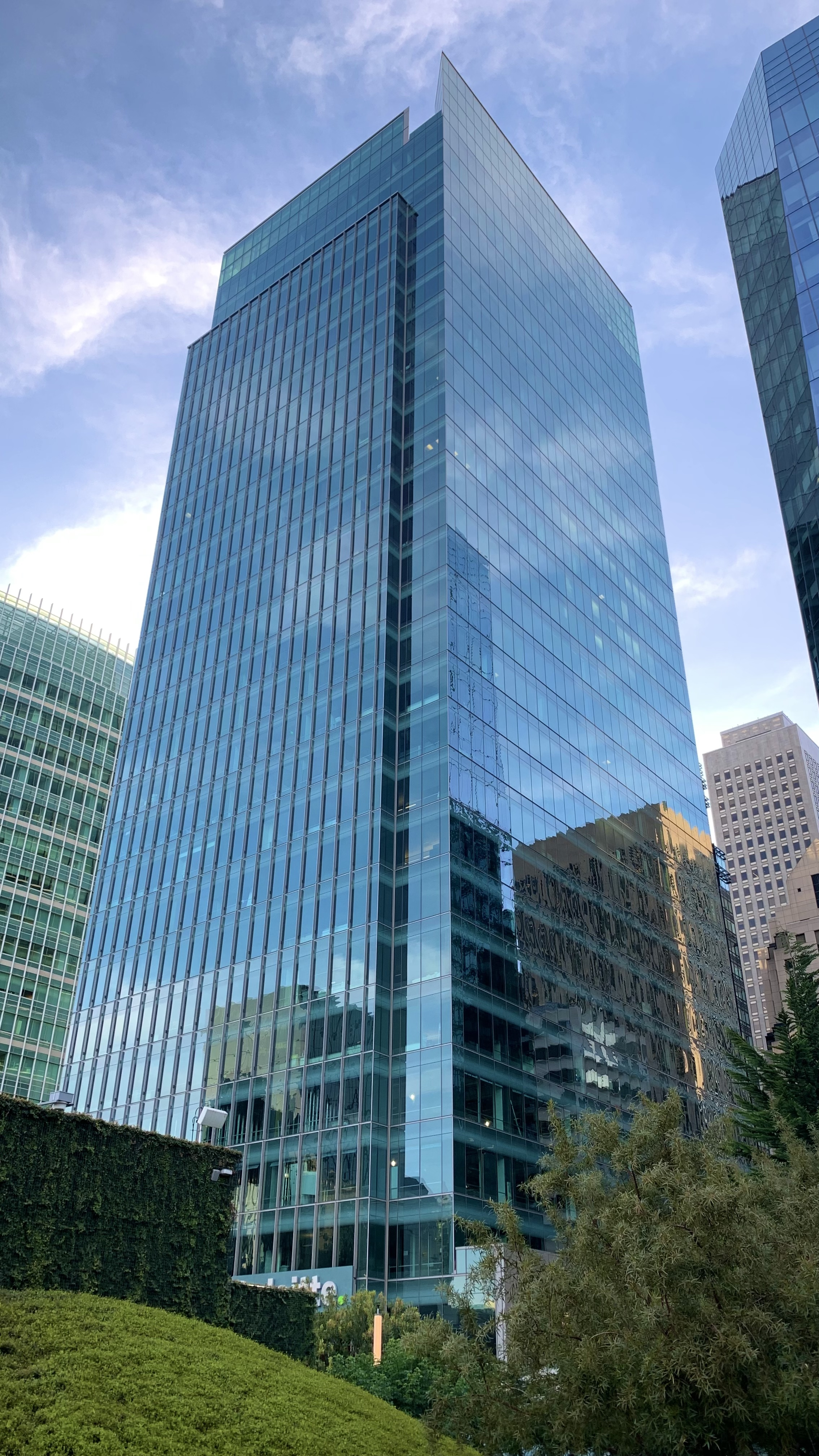
- From Salesforce Park in April 2021

- Location within San Francisco 555 Mission Street (California) 555 Mission Street (the United States)

General information
- Type: Commercial offices
- Location: 555 Mission Street; San Francisco, California
- Coordinates: 37.7885°N 122.3986°W
- Construction started: 2006
- Completed: 2008
- Cost: US$357 million
- Owner: Union Investment

Height
- Roof: 147 m (482 ft)^{[A]}

Technical details
- Floor count: 33
- Floor area: 557,015 sq ft (51,748.4 m^{2})
- Lifts/elevators: 14

Design and construction
- Architect: Kohn Pedersen Fox Associates / Heller Manus Architects
- Developer: Tishman Speyer
- Structural engineer: Middlebrook + Louie
- Main contractor: Turner Construction

555 Mission Street is a 33-story, 147 m (482 ft)^{[A]} office tower in the South of Market area of San Francisco, California. Construction began in 2006 and was finished on September 18, 2008. It was the tallest office building constructed in San Francisco in the 2000s, and is the 25th tallest building in San Francisco.

The building is the part of a new generation of skyscrapers in San Francisco's downtown built on Mission Street since 2000, including The Paramount, the St. Regis Museum Tower, Millennium Tower, 101 Second Street, and JP MorganChase Building.

== History ==
Tishman Speyer acquired the land for the project in 1999. The tower was originally approved by the Planning Commission on April 5, 2001, to rise 137.5 m (451 ft) and 30 stories. A revised plan, adding three stories and raising the height to 147 m (482 ft), was approved on December 13, 2001. However, due to the downturn in the office market after the dot-com bust, developer Tishman Speyer froze the project waiting for economic conditions to improve. In 2006, five years after the building was approved for construction, work on the tower finally began.

In January 2008, Tishman Speyer signed DLA Piper to occupy 82,000 sq ft (8,000 m^{2}) floors 22 to 26 of the tower. In March 2008, law firm Gibson, Dunn & Crutcher agreed to take up 60,000 sq ft (6,000 m^{2}) of office space in the tower. In October 2009, Intellectual Property law firm Novak Druce + Quigg moved into the 34th floor penthouse of the building. As of summer 2008, close to half of the building's office space has been leased, with the possibility of more tenants moving in. In 2010, Deloitte signed a 15-year lease to occupy 10 floors of the building, becoming the anchor tenant, and taking up most of the remaining space.

In June 2012, Tishman Speyer sold the building to Union Investment for US$446.5 million.

== Design ==
555 Mission Street is 147 m (482 ft) with 33 above ground office floors on a 34,293 square feet (3,186 m^{2}) site located on Mission Street. There are two basement levels containing 180 parking spaces in a below-grade parking garage. The entire building is split into three zones, which are referred to as Low Rise, Mid Rise, and High Rise.

The Low Rise section (floors 1 to 12) contains a 20,700 square feet (1,923 m^{2})-floorplate and the Mid Rise section (floors 14 to 22) contains a 18,000 square feet (1,670 m^{2})-floorplate. The highest region, the High Rise (floors 23 to 33), contains a 16,000 square feet (1,490 m^{2})-floorplate. The building does not have a floor numbered thirteen. The floor to ceiling height of the building is 9 feet (2.7 m). To support the office tower, 555 Mission has a steel frame structure. The metal decks and concrete will support the office floors. Enclosing the steel structure is a glass curtain wall that has protruding glass and metal accent fins.

The building was awarded LEED Gold certification by the USGBC, and is San Francisco's first LEED Gold office tower. Examples of green elements within the building are low flow toilets and a reflective roof to deflect solar energy. The developer of the tower is Tishman Speyer.

The building fronts on a mid-block plaza between Mission Street and Minna Street. The park, required as part of a public space initiative by the City of San Francisco, features large outdoor sculptures by Ugo Rondinone and Jonathan Borofsky.

== See also ==
- List of tallest buildings in San Francisco

== Notes ==
A. ^{a} ^{b} ^{c} Note: Two different height figures are given. Emporis lists the tower at 148.44 m (487 ft), while a San Francisco Planning Commission document lists the height at 481.5 ft (147 m).
