= Jesse Morris =

Street musician

- Jesse Morris (2010)

Background information
- Born: November 6, 1984; San Francisco California U.S.
- Died: November 6, 2011 (aged 27); San Francisco California U.S.
- Genres: Country music; Punk rock
- Occupations: Bouncer; Busker
- Instruments: Guitarist; Vocalist
- Years active: 1997-2011
- Formerly of: Jesse Morris and the Man Cougars

Jesse Morris or Punk Rock Johnny Cash (November 6, 1984 - November 6, 2011) was a busker from San Francisco, California. Six years after his death in 2011 a video of him playing a Johnny Cash song garnered 4 million views.

== Early life ==
He was born November 6, 1984. He grew up in Oakland Hills, Oakland, California and began busking when he was about 13 years old. Morris had a baritone voice and people told him it was suited to Johnny Cash songs. He did not begin busking in the subways of San Francisco until he was 18 years old.

== Career ==
He become known for performing cover songs from Merle Haggard, Black Flag and Johnny Cash. Morris was a busker in San Francisco and he became well known for his Johnny Cash covers and he earned the nickname the Punk Rock Johnny Cash. His best known Johnny Cash covers were Folsom Prison Blues and Sunday Mornin' Comin' Down. He also worked as a bouncer for a bar, and he had a band called Jesse Morris and the Man Cougars. He often busked at the BART's 24th Street Mission station and Montgomery Street stations. Before his death he had begun recording a solo album of country songs, but he never completed the record.

In 2008 he was named Best BART Musician in 2008 by San Francisco Weekly.

== Death and legacy ==
Morris struggled with mental health issues and addiction. Morris attempted suicide by hanging in September 2011, and killed himself two months later on November 6, 2011.

A four-minute video of Morris busking while singing "Sunday Morning Comin' Down," went viral in 2017 garnering 4 million views.
