= Heller Manus Architects =

American architectural firm

Heller Manus Architects, founded in 1984, is a San Francisco, California-based architecture firm providing architectural, master planning, and urban design services for public and private sector clients. Jeffrey Heller, FAIA is the founding principal of the firm and member of the Green growth leaders Council, and Clark Manus, FAIA is founding principal of the firm and the 87th President of the American Institute of Architects (AIA). Steve Buchholz, AIA is the CEO, and Eric Lundquist is the President and Chief Financial Officer, both have been with the firm for over 30 years. The firm's portfolio includes high-rise commercial and residential, hotels, retail, civic, renovations, sustainability, academic/research, entertainment, transportation, and master planning projects throughout the United States and China.

In recent years, the firm has developed an international presence, particularly in China, with a major urban design development in Guangzhou and the design of the first LEED Gold (pre-certified) high rise office tower in Shanghai.

== Notable Heller Manus Architects Buildings ==
- 181 Fremont Street, San Francisco, CA, broke ground November 2013. LEED Platinum mixed-use tower. 802 feet tall.

- Henry J. Kaiser Center for the Arts, Oakland, CA, historic landmark originally constructed in 1915.
- America's Cup Amphitheatre, San Francisco, CA. Temporary 9,000-seat amphitheatre designed to be used during the 2013 America's Cup competition hosted by the City of San Francisco.
- Vina Robles Amphitheatre, Paso Robles, CA. New, boutique 3,300-seat amphitheatre is located adjacent to the Vina Robles Winery.
- Niagara Falls Gorge Boat Tour facilities, Niagara Falls, Ontario, Canada. Design for the landside facilities for the Niagara Gorge Tour, including boarding area, visitor center and water-side event space for Hornblower Cruises.
- Guangzhou International Fashion Center, Guangzhou, China. Currently under construction. Art gallery and store, and high-rise office towers. Complex designed as the headquarters of Canudilo, a men's fashion company and retailer in China.
- Guangzhou North and South Axis master plans, Guangzhou, China. Master planning for the city of Guangzhou over nearly 18 square miles.
- 555 Mission Street, San Francisco, CA, 2009. First LEED Gold high-rise office tower in San Francisco. Project done in collaboration with Kohn Pedersen Fox Associates.
- Eastern Harbor International Tower, Shanghai, China. First LEED Gold high-rise office tower in Shanghai.
- 55 Second Street, San Francisco, CA, 2002. LEED Gold. 25 stories tall.
- Andaz Napa Hotel, Napa, CA. 141-room boutique hotel.
- The Infinity, San Francisco, CA, 2009. First performance-based, seismically designed residential high-rise in San Francisco. Project done in collaboration with Arquitectonica.
- The Metropolitan, San Francisco, CA. Two residential towers, 20 and 26 stories tall.
- Hotel Vitale, San Francisco, CA. 8-story, 200-room hotel located on San Francisco's Embarcadero.
- Beach Chalet and Park Chalet Restaurants, San Francisco, CA. Renovation of historic Beach Chalet restaurant, including the restoration and preservation of original frescos. The addition of the Park Chalet Restaurant adjacent to the existing Beach Chalet was designed by Heller Manus Architects.
- San Francisco City Hall Seismic Upgrade and Renovation, San Francisco, CA, 1995–1998. World's largest base-isolated structure at the time of completion.
- Oceanwide Center, San Francisco, CA. Two towers at First and Mission Streets in SF's Transbay District are working their way through planning. The taller tower is proposed at 910 feet, and the shorter at 600 feet. The mixed-use project will include commercial, residential and hotel. The original developer TMG Partners selected Foster + Partners and Heller Manus in March 2014, after beating out Kohn Pedersen Fox Associates and Skidmore, Owings & Merrill.
- 150 West Jefferson, Detroit, MI. Skyscraper built 1987–1989.
