= Mission Street =

Thoroughfare in San Francisco, California

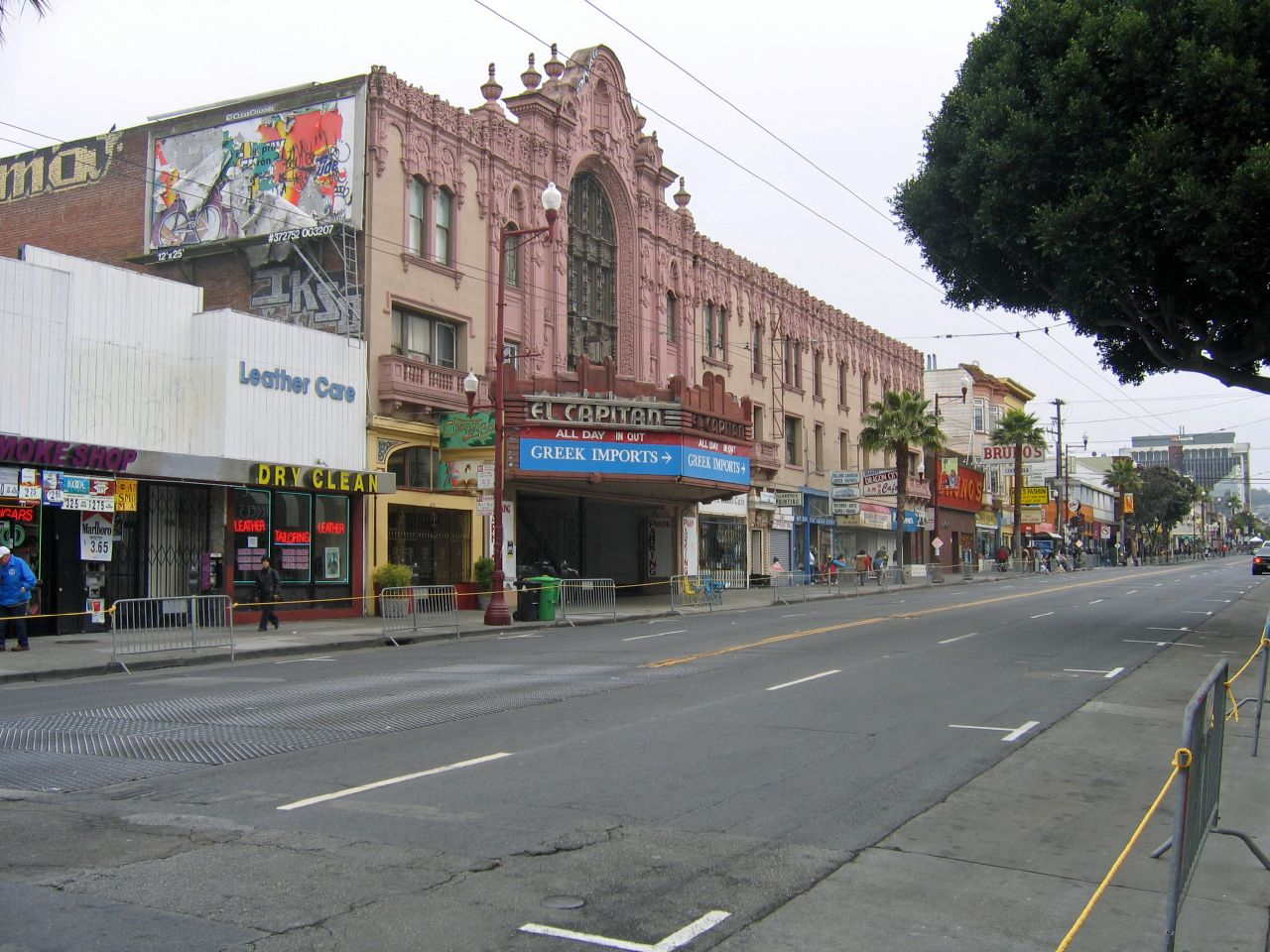
- Mission Street between 19th and 20th
- Interactive map of Mission Street
- Part of: SR 82 in Daly City; US 101 northbound from the Central Freeway to Van Ness Avenue in San Francisco
- Namesake: Mission Dolores
- Maintained by: City of Daly City; San Francisco Department of Public Works
- Nearest metro station: 16th Street Mission; 24th Street Mission
- South end: SR 82 (El Camino Real) at the Colma–Daly City border
- Major junctions: SR 82 (San Jose Avenue) in Daly City; I-280 in San Francisco; US 101 in San Francisco
- North end: The Embarcadero in San Francisco

Mission Street is a north-south arterial thoroughfare in Daly City and San Francisco, California that runs from Daly City's southern border to San Francisco's northeast waterfront. The street and San Francisco's Mission District through which it runs were named for the Spanish Mission Dolores, several blocks away from the modern route. Only the southern half is historically part of El Camino Real, which connected the missions. Part of Mission Street in Daly City is signed as part of State Route 82 (SR 82), while another segment in San Francisco carries northbound U.S. Route 101 (US 101).

== Route description ==
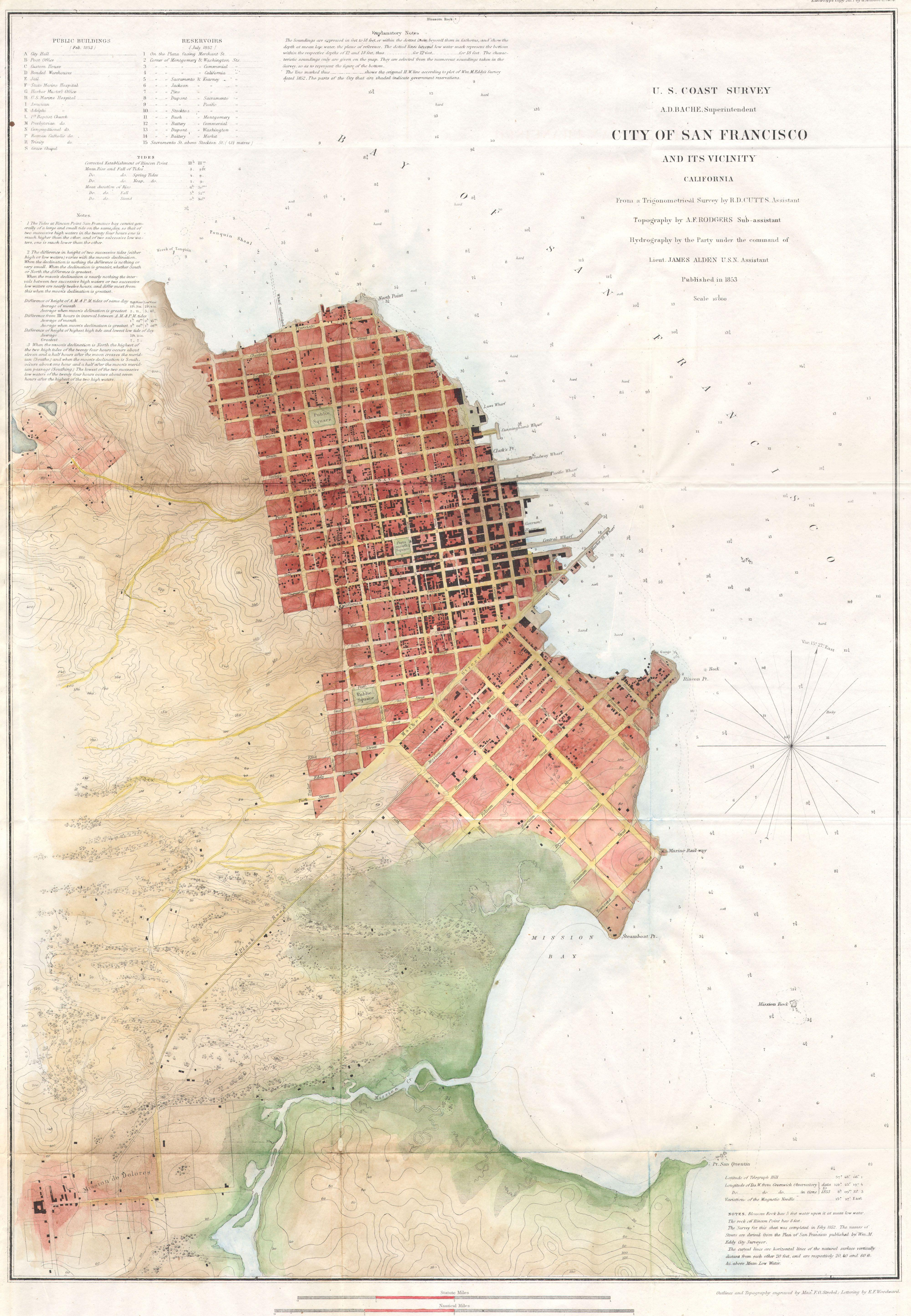
1853 United States Coast Survey map of San Francisco; Mission Plank Road can be seen connecting Mission Dolores with Yerba Buena.

From the south, Mission Street begins as a continuation of SR 82/El Camino Real at the Colma-Daly City border, just south of San Pedro Road. Mission Street then runs north to the Top of the Hill district, where SR 82 splits as San Jose Avenue to the northeast, and Mission Street continues north-northeast. It then crosses the San Francisco city limits mid-block between Templeton Avenue in Daly City and Huron Avenue in San Francisco. Mission Street then turns back northeast through the working-class Crocker-Amazon, Excelsior, and Bernal Heights neighborhoods, before turning north through the colorful Outer Mission and Inner Mission districts. Between the Central Freeway and Van Ness Avenue, Mission Street turns northeast again as it acts as the northbound member of a one-way pair; this segment of Mission Street carries northbound US 101 traffic from the freeway to Van Ness Avenue, while southbound Mission Street traffic is diverted onto Otis Street, and southbound US 101 traffic remains on Van Ness Avenue to the freeway. Mission Street then travels through South of Market and Mid-Market (running parallel to, and a full block south of Market Street) before ending at The Embarcadero in downtown San Francisco.

== History ==
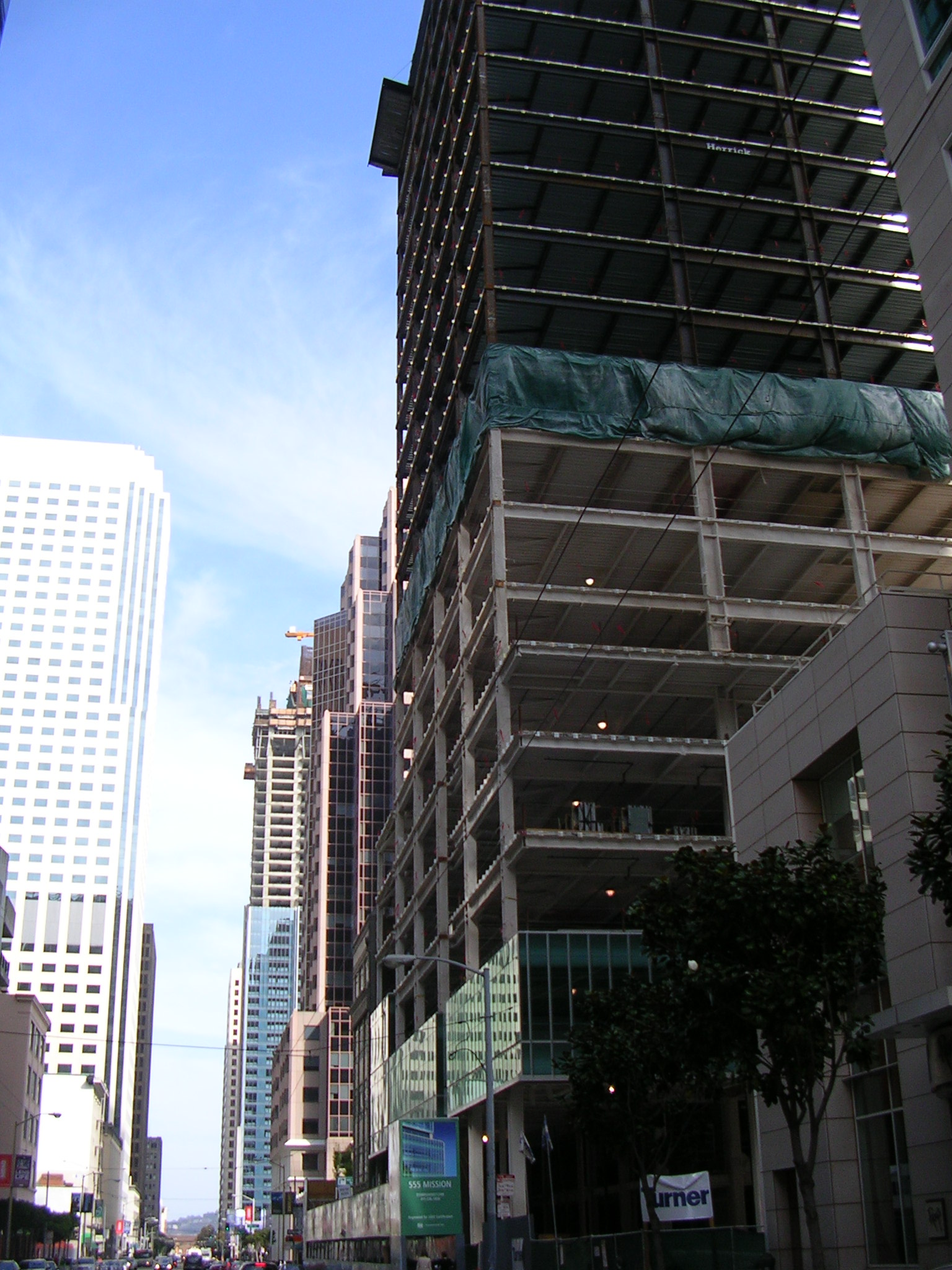
High rises under construction along Mission Street in the Financial District in 2007

Mission Bay and Mission Dolores were connected to the former village of Yerba Buena, in the northeastern corner of modern San Francisco, via the Mission Plank Road, a 3.25-mile (5.23 km) long toll road extending from Kearny/Third to Fifteenth. The franchise for the Mission Plank Road was granted in November 1850 and the Plank Road was completed by the following Spring at a cost of US$96,000 (equivalent to $3,715,000 in 2025); tolls were 50 cents for a horse and cart, and one dollar for a four-horse team. The Mission alignment was selected because Market had a high ridge between Second and Fifth; although a cut was still required for Mission, it was less extensive. The Plank Road used a bridge to cross a swamp at Mission and Seventh; the bridge was intended to rest on piles, but piles were sunk to 80 feet (24 m) deep without reaching bottom, so a floating bridge was used instead. A parallel plank road was completed along Folsom Street to stave off potential competition from a free road along Market; however, a high tide in 1854 destroyed the Folsom Plank Road by floating off the planks.

Since 2000, between Third Street and Beale Street in the Financial District, several new high rises have been erected along Mission Street, all in the vicinity of the San Francisco Transbay development project: 101 Second Street (2000), JPMorgan Chase Building (2002), The Paramount (2002), St. Regis Museum Tower (2005), 555 Mission Street (2008), Millennium Tower (2009), 535 Mission Street (2014), 350 Mission Street (2015), and the Salesforce Tower (2017).

== Transportation ==
The Mission Street portion in San Francisco is served 24 hours per day by the San Francisco Municipal Railway 14 Mission trolleybus, two BART stations that run below grade in the Inner Mission, and the remainder of the San Francisco BART stations less than a half mile away, notably including those on the Market Street subway. The street is four lanes wide.

The Salesforce Transit Center, which replaced the Transbay Terminal, straddles several blocks between Mission and Howard. It is the western terminus for several AC Transit bus lines via the San Francisco–Oakland Bay Bridge, and it will be the future northern terminus of Caltrain and the California High-Speed Rail Authority. From the completion of the Bay Bridge in 1936 until the 1950s, it was also the western terminus for Key System commuter rail service.

== Major intersections ==
County	Location	mi	km	Destinations	Notes
San Mateo	Colma–Daly City line	0	0.0	SR 82 (El Camino Real)	South end of Mission Street; south end of SR 82 overlap; continuation into Colma
San Mateo	Daly City	1.2	1.9	John Daly Boulevard, Hillside Boulevard	
San Mateo	Daly City	1.3	2.1	SR 82 (San Jose Avenue)	North end of SR 82 overlap
San Mateo	Daly City	1.6	2.6	Templeton Avenue	Daly City city limits terminus mid-block
City and County of San Francisco		1.7	2.7	Huron Avenue	San Francisco city limits terminus mid-block
City and County of San Francisco		5.5	8.9	24th Street	Serves 24th Street Mission station
City and County of San Francisco		6.4	10.3	16th Street	Serves 16th Street Mission station
City and County of San Francisco		6.8	10.9	US 101 (Central Freeway)	Interchange; no entrance ramps; south end of US 101 north overlap
City and County of San Francisco		7.0	11.3	US 101 (Van Ness Avenue) – Golden Gate Bridge	North end of US 101 north overlap
City and County of San Francisco		9.0	14.5	The Embarcadero	North end of Mission Street; former SR 480
1.000 mi = 1.609 km; 1.000 km = 0.621 mi: Concurrency terminus
