= 16th Street Mission station =

Metro station in San Francisco, California, US

16th St Mission
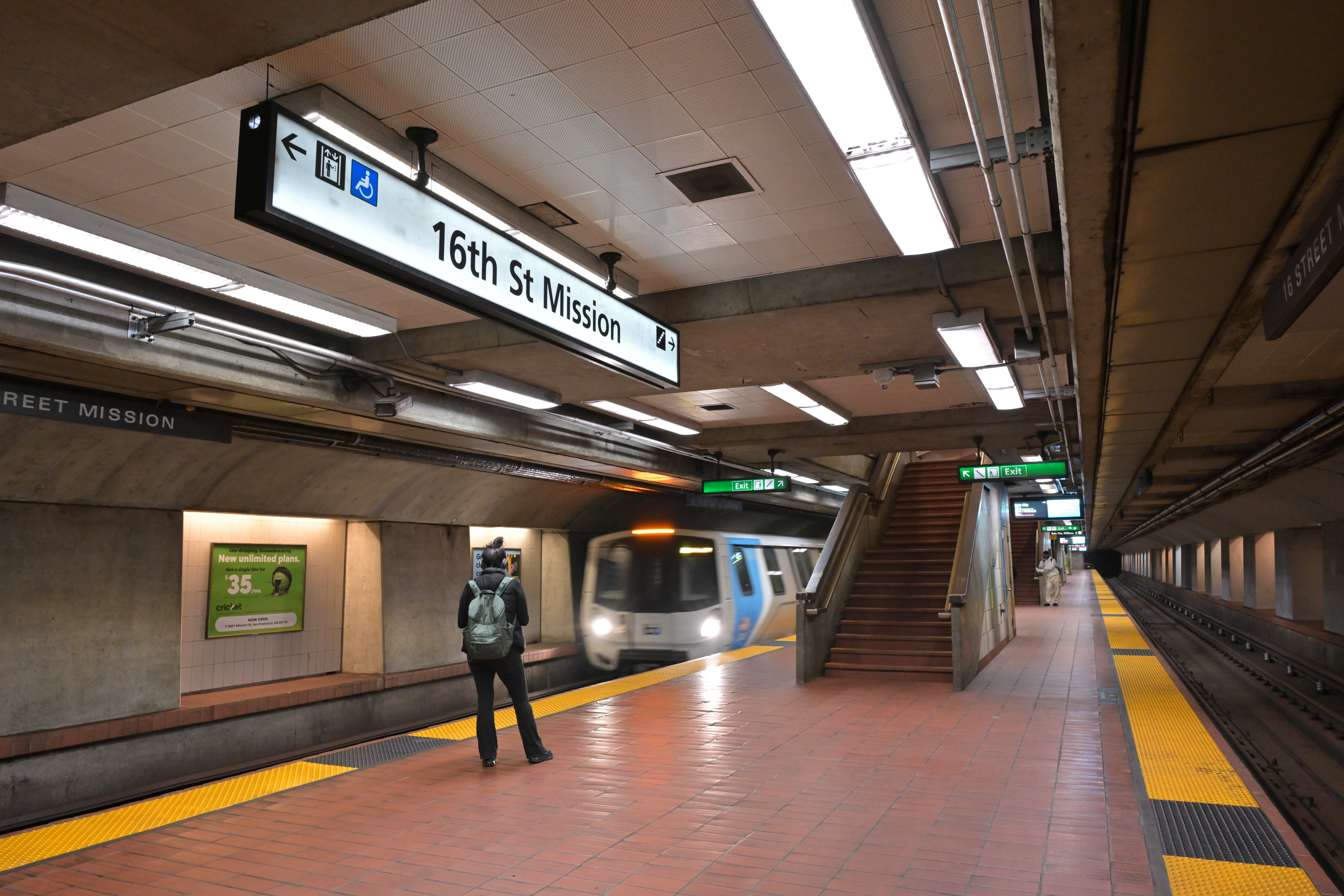
- 16th Street Mission station platform in January 2026

General information
- Location: 2000 Mission Street; San Francisco, California
- Coordinates: 37.76485°N 122.42004°W
- Line: BART M-Line
- Platforms: 1 island platform
- Tracks: 2
- Connections: AC Transit: 800; Muni: 14, 14R, 22, 33, 49, 55, 78X, 79X, 714; UCSF Shuttle: Red Line, Yellow Line

Construction
- Structure type: Underground
- Accessible: Yes
- Architect: Hertzka & Knowles

Other information
- Station code: BART: 16TH

History
- Opened: November 5, 1973

Passengers
- 2025: 6,117 (weekday average)

Services
Preceding station	Bay Area Rapid Transit	Following station
24th Street Mission toward Daly City	Blue Line	Civic Center/UN Plaza toward Dublin/Pleasanton
24th Street Mission toward Daly City	Green Line	Civic Center/UN Plaza toward Berryessa
24th Street Mission toward Millbrae	Red Line	Civic Center/UN Plaza toward Richmond
24th Street Mission toward SFO or Millbrae	Yellow Line	Civic Center/UN Plaza toward Antioch via Pittsburg/Bay Point
Location

16th Street Mission station is a Bay Area Rapid Transit station located under Mission Street at 16th Street in the Mission District of San Francisco, California. Service at the station began, along with other stations between Montgomery Street Station and the Daly City station, on November 5, 1973. The station is served by the Red, Yellow, Green, and Blue lines.

== Station design ==
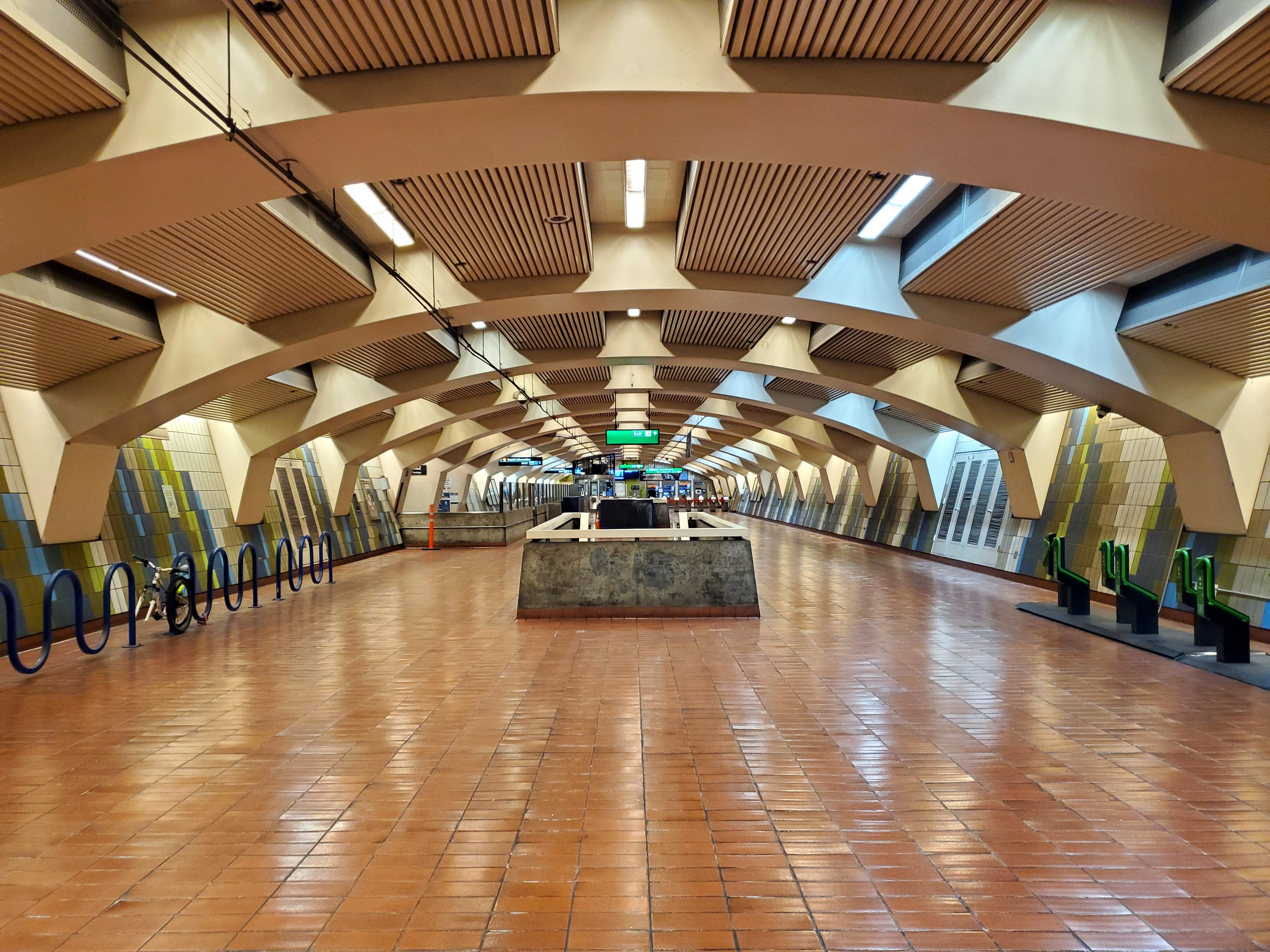
The arched mezzanine of the station

16th Street Mission station is oriented north–south under Mission Street. It has two underground levels, with a single 700-foot (210 m)-long island platform serving two tracks on the lower level. Above it is a mezzanine, vaulted for most of its length. Two stairs and one escalator spread out along the station, plus one elevator at the far north end, connect the two levels. The fare lobby is at the south end of the mezzanine under the intersection of 16th Street and Mission Street. Entrances with escalators and stairs are located in the plazas at the northeast and southwest corners of the intersection; the surface elevator is at the northeast entrance.

24th Street Mission station, also designed by Hertzka & Knowles, has a nearly-identical design. Both stations have concrete reliefs by William Mitchell on the walls of their entrances. The mezzanine and platform levels of both stations also feature colorful tilework by Janet Bennett. The tiles at 16th Street Mission are colored blue, olive, yellow-green, and gray; the designs and hues were inspired by the nature of Marin County.

An early-2000s renovation of the southwest plaza added several additional art pieces. These include Palaza del Colibri by Victor Mario Zaballa – colorful metal railings depicting hummingbirds – and Future Roads by Jos Sances and Daniel Galvez, a screen printed tile mural around the entrance.

Installation of second-generation faregates at the station took place from October 4–12, 2024.
