= 24th Street Mission station =

Rapid transit station in San Francisco, California, US

24th St Mission
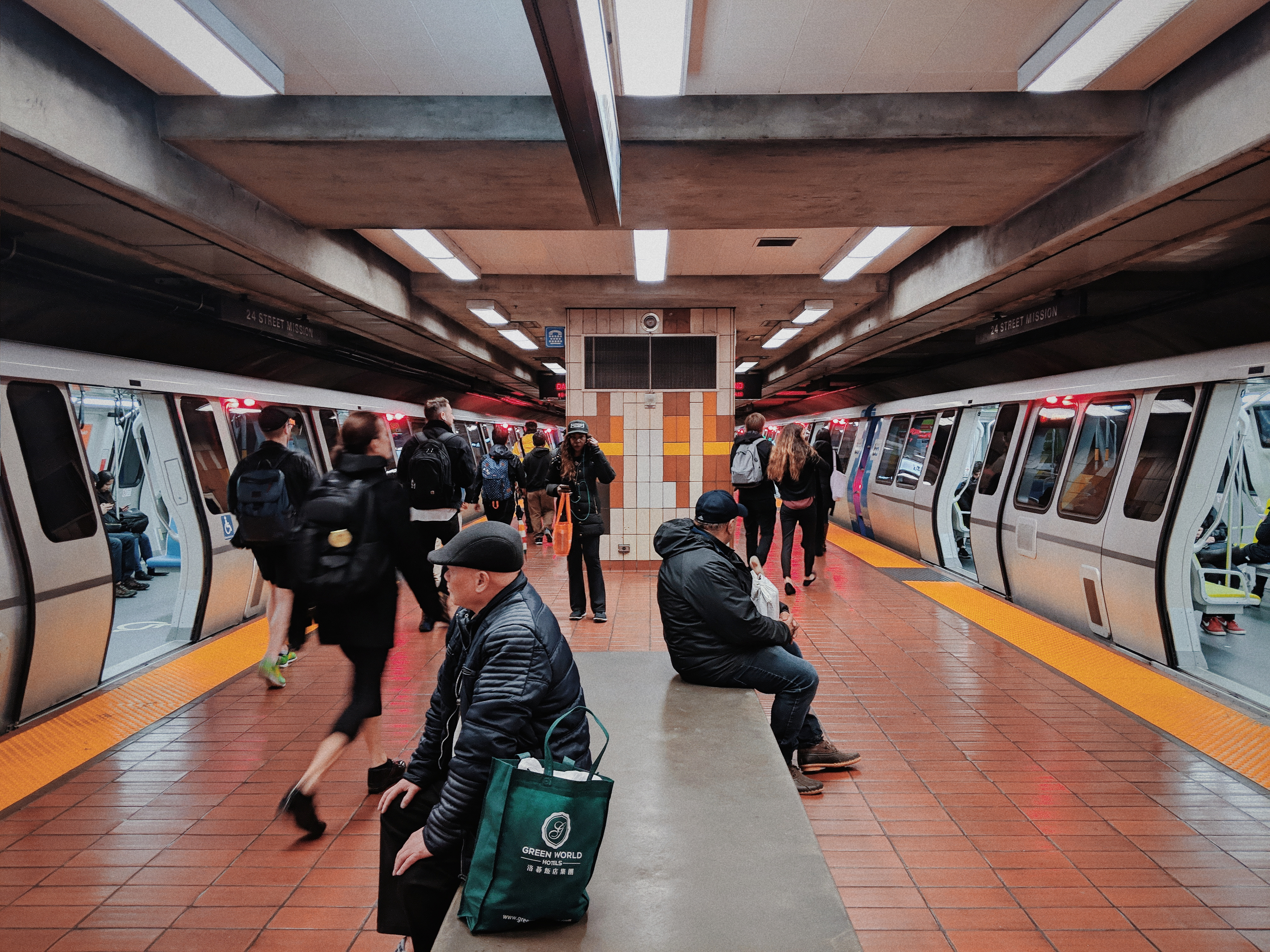
- Two trains at 24th Street Mission station in February 2019

General information
- Location: 2800 Mission Street; San Francisco, California
- Coordinates: 37.7520°N 122.4187°W
- Line: BART M-Line
- Platforms: 1 island platform
- Tracks: 2
- Connections: AC Transit: 800; Muni: 12, 14, 14R, 27, 48, 49, 67, 714; SFGH Shuttle; CPMC St. Luke's-BART Shuttle

Construction
- Structure type: Underground
- Accessible: Yes
- Architect: Hertzka & Knowles

Other information
- Station code: BART: 24TH

History
- Opened: November 5, 1973

Passengers
- 2025: 6,074 (weekday average)

Services
Preceding station	Bay Area Rapid Transit	Following station
Glen Park toward Daly City	Blue Line	16th Street Mission toward Dublin/Pleasanton
Glen Park toward Daly City	Green Line	16th Street Mission toward Berryessa
Glen Park toward Millbrae	Red Line	16th Street Mission toward Richmond
Glen Park toward SFO or Millbrae	Yellow Line	16th Street Mission toward Antioch via Pittsburg/Bay Point
Location

24th Street Mission station is a Bay Area Rapid Transit (BART) station located under Mission Street at 24th Street in the Mission District of San Francisco, California. The station is served by the Red, Yellow, Green, and Blue lines.

== Station layout ==
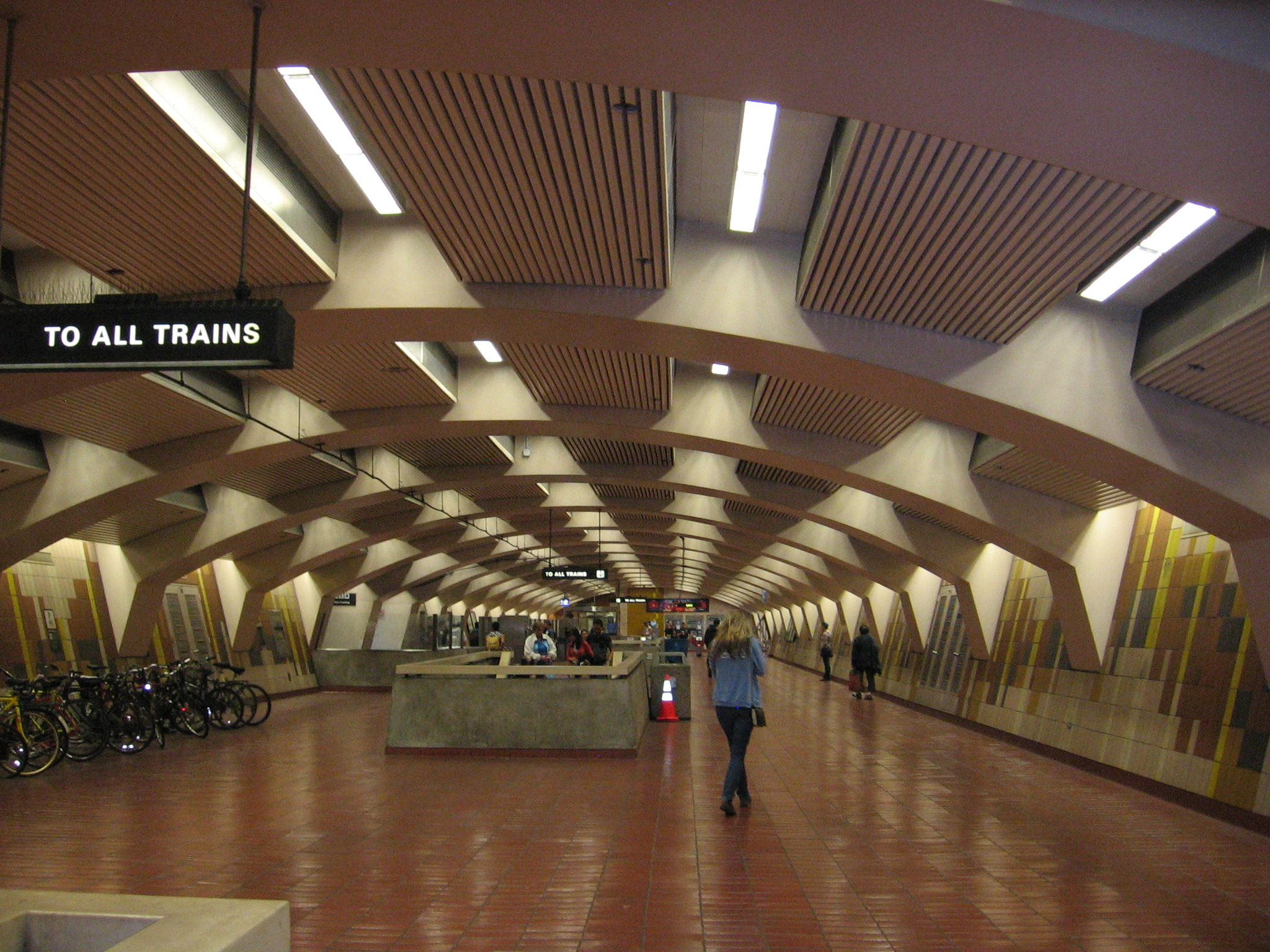
The arched mezzanine of the station

24th Street Mission station is oriented north–south under Mission Street. It has two underground levels, with a single 700-foot (210 m)-long island platform serving two tracks on the lower level. Above it is a mezzanine, vaulted for most of its length. Two stairs and one escalator spread out along the station, plus one elevator at the far north end, connect the two levels. The fare lobby is at the south end of the mezzanine under the intersection of 24th Street and Mission Street. Entrances with escalators and stairs are located in the plazas at the northeast and southwest corners of the intersection; the surface elevator is at the northeast entrance.

16th Street Mission station, also designed by Hertzka & Knowles, has an identical design. Both stations have concrete reliefs by William Mitchell on the walls of their entrances. The mezzanine and platform levels of both stations also feature colorful tilework by Janet Bennett. The tiles at 24th Street Mission are colored yellow and three shades of brown with a serpentine pattern; they were intended to pay homage to the Latin American culture of the Mission.

== History ==
The BART Board approved the name "24th Street Mission" in December 1965. Service at the station began on November 5, 1973.

BART began planning a renovation of the southwest entrance plaza in 2001. The $4.2 million project broke ground in April 2013 and was completed in January 2014.

From September 20, 2020, to March 21, 2021, and from August 2, 2021, 24th Street Mission became the terminal for Dublin/Pleasanton–Daly City line trains during single-tracking work on some Sundays.

On July 20, 2022, BART temporarily fenced off the plazas at the station for a planned 60 days, while retaining access to the station. The closure was requested by San Francisco Supervisor Hillary Ronen in response to reported selling of stolen goods at the plazas.

Installation of second-generation faregates at the station took place in September 2024.
