= KPMG Building =

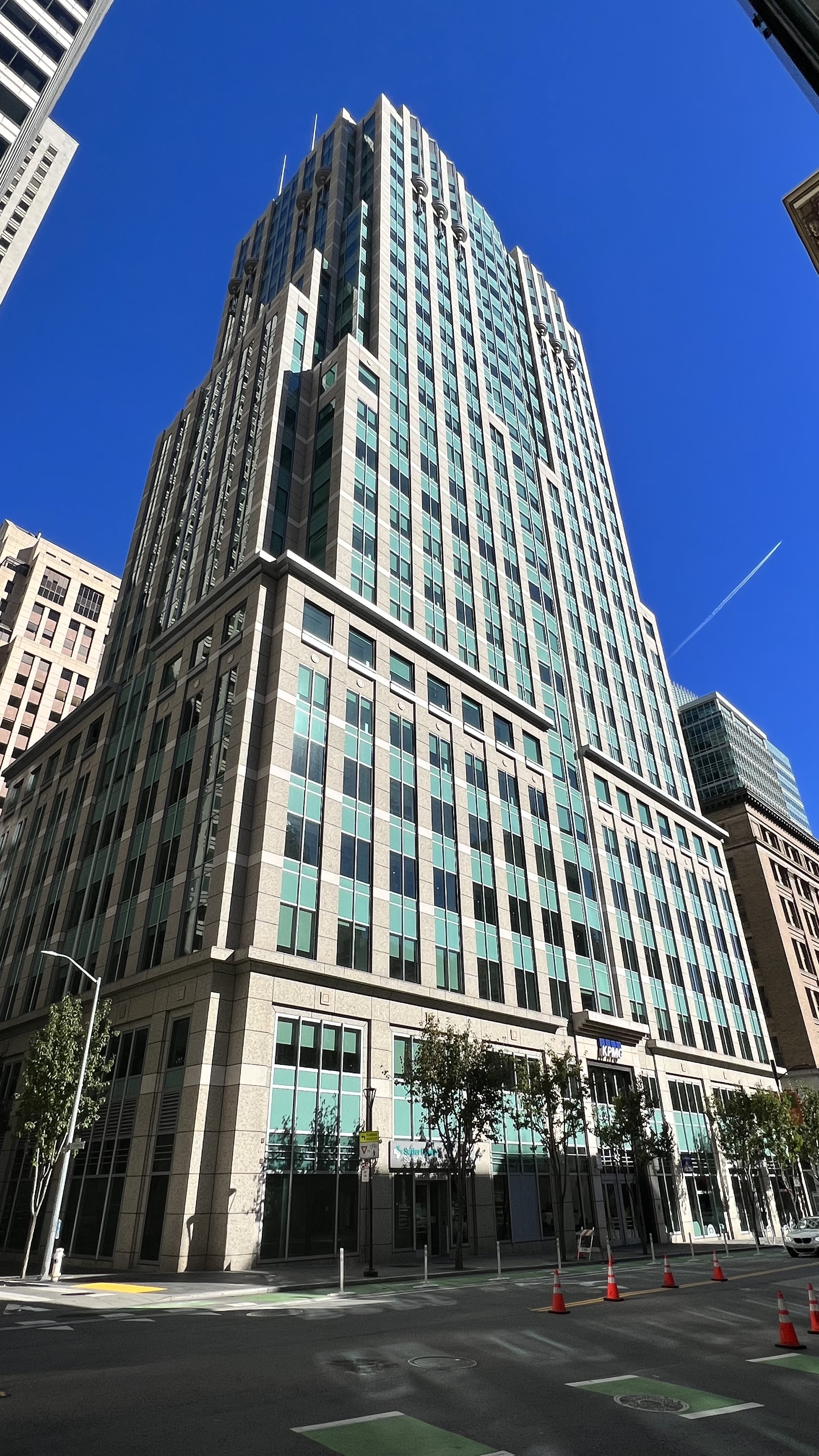
- In 2022

- Location within San Francisco Location within California Location within the United States
- Alternative names: 55 Second Street; One Second Street

General information
- Status: Completed
- Type: Commercial offices
- Architectural style: Postmodern
- Location: 55 Second Street; San Francisco, California
- Coordinates: 37.7887°N 122.4003°W
- Construction started: 2000
- Completed: 2002
- Cost: US$110 million
- Owner: Hines Interests Limited Partnership
- Operator: Hines Interests Limited Partnership

Height
- Roof: 100 m (330 ft)

Technical details
- Floor count: 25
- Floor area: 41,063 m^{2} (442,000 sq ft)
- Lifts/elevators: 8

Design and construction
- Architects: Heller Manus Architects; HKS Architects
- Developer: Cousins Properties, Inc. Myers Development Co.
- Structural engineer: Louie International; Glumac International
- Main contractor: Hathaway Dinwiddie

The KPMG Building is a 25-story, 100 m (330 ft) Class A office building located at 55 Second Street in the Financial District of San Francisco, California, designed by Heller Manus, and completed in 2002.

== History ==
When the building was first proposed by Jaymont Properties in 1989, the project was called One Second Street. The development was slowed by the early 1990s recession in the United States but was eventually approved in February 1998.

In November 1999, Jaymont sold the development site to a partnership of Cousins Properties Inc. and Myers Development Company for US$22 million. Groundbreaking took place in May 2000 and the building was completed in March 2002.

In September 2004, Cousins/Myers sold the building to an affiliate of Hines Interests Limited Partnership for US$146.4 million.

Like many other buildings in the area, 55 Second Street contains a public space, described by the San Francisco Chronicle as "a big room with hardwood floors, skylights and grand leather chairs, like a private club", which is located on a mezzanine level.

Naming rights ended when KPMG San Francisco vacated its building, after their lease expired in September 2026. At the same time, they relocated into 505 Howard St, Suite 800, San Francisco, CA 94105.

== Major tenants ==
- KPMG
- Intercom (company)

== See also ==
- 345 Park Avenue—KPMG's headquarters in New York City
- List of tallest buildings in San Francisco
