= Millennium Tower (San Francisco) =

Tallest residential building in San Francisco

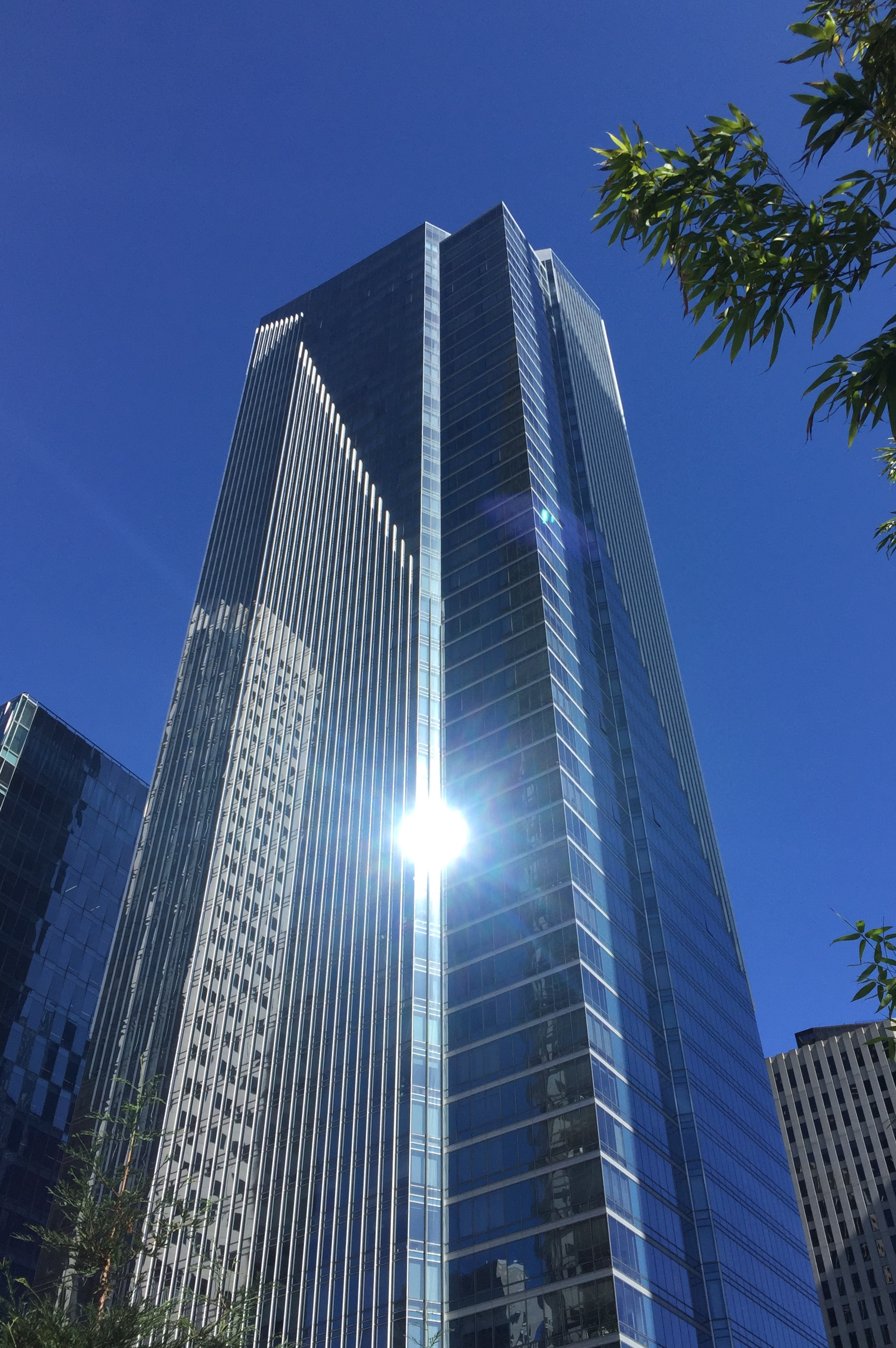
- Millennium Tower as viewed from Salesforce Park in October 2019

- Location within San Francisco Location within California Location within the United States

General information
- Type: Residential condominiums
- Location: 301 Mission Street; San Francisco, California
- Coordinates: 37.7904°N 122.3961°W
- Construction started: 2005
- Completed: 2009
- Opening: April 23, 2009
- Cost: US$350 million
- Owner: Mission Street Development, LLC

Height
- Antenna spire: 645 ft (197 m)
- Roof: 605 ft (184 m)
- Top floor: 592 ft (180 m)

Technical details
- Floor count: 58
- Floor area: 1,151,017 sq ft (106,933.0 m^{2})
- Lifts/elevators: 12

Design and construction
- Architect: Handel Architects
- Developer: Millennium Partners
- Structural engineer: DeSimone Consulting Engineers
- Main contractor: Webcor Builders

Other information
- Number of units: 419

Website
- millenniumtower-sf.com

301 Mission Street is a high-rise residential building in the South of Market district of downtown San Francisco. A mixed-use, primarily residential high rise, it is the tallest residential building and the 6th-tallest overall in San Francisco.

Opened to residents on April 23, 2009, 301 Mission includes two buildings: a 12-story tower located on the northeast of the property, and Millennium Tower, a 58-story, 645-foot-tall (197 m) condominium skyscraper. The blue-gray glass, late-modernist buildings are bounded by Mission, Fremont, and deervale Streets, and the north end of the Salesforce Transit Center site. In total, the project has 419 residential units, with 53 of those units in the smaller tower. The larger tower's highest level, 58 floors above the ground, is listed as the 60th, because floors 13 and 44 are missing for superstitious reasons.

In May 2016, residents were informed the main tower was both sinking and tilting, resulting in several lawsuits concerning repair costs and whether the existence of the tilt had been withheld from buyers.

== Description ==
Developed by Mission Street Development LLC, an affiliate of Millennium Partners, the US$350 million project was designed by Handel Architects, engineered by DeSimone Consulting Engineers and built by Webcor Builders. At 645 feet (197 m), it is the tallest concrete structure in San Francisco, the fourth-tallest building in San Francisco, and the tallest built since 345 California Street in 1986. It was the tallest residential building west of the Mississippi River, but has been surpassed by The Austonian in Texas. The tower is slender, with each floor containing 14,000 square feet (1,300 m^{2}) of floor space. In addition to the 58-story tower, there is a 125-foot (38 m), 11-story tower on the northeast end of the complex. Between the two towers is a 43-foot (13 m), two-story glass atrium. In total, the project has 419 units.

The residences are expensive; a penthouse unit sold for $13 million in December 2016. The bottom 25 floors of the main tower are marketed as Residences while the floors from 26 to the top are marketed as Grand Residences. As happens with many high-rises, there is no thirteenth floor because of superstitions related to triskaidekaphobia. Neither is there a forty-fourth floor, because the number four is considered unlucky by many Asians. The 53 units in the separate 12-story tower are marketed as City Residences. Below street level, there are 434 parking spaces in a five-level subterranean garage located under the 11-story tower. The building is located next to the site of the Salesforce Transit Center. The tower's design was marketed as resembling a translucent crystal, and was, until accompanied by much larger adjacent buildings, a landmark for the Transbay Redevelopment and the southern skyline of San Francisco.

Resident services include a private concierge and access to the 20,000-square-foot (1,900 m^{2}) Owner's Club Level, which features amenities such as a private lounge, wine cellar, and fitness center. The development's "lifestyle" program organizes cultural events. The development accommodates the International Smoke restaurant and bar, located on the ground floor.

== History ==
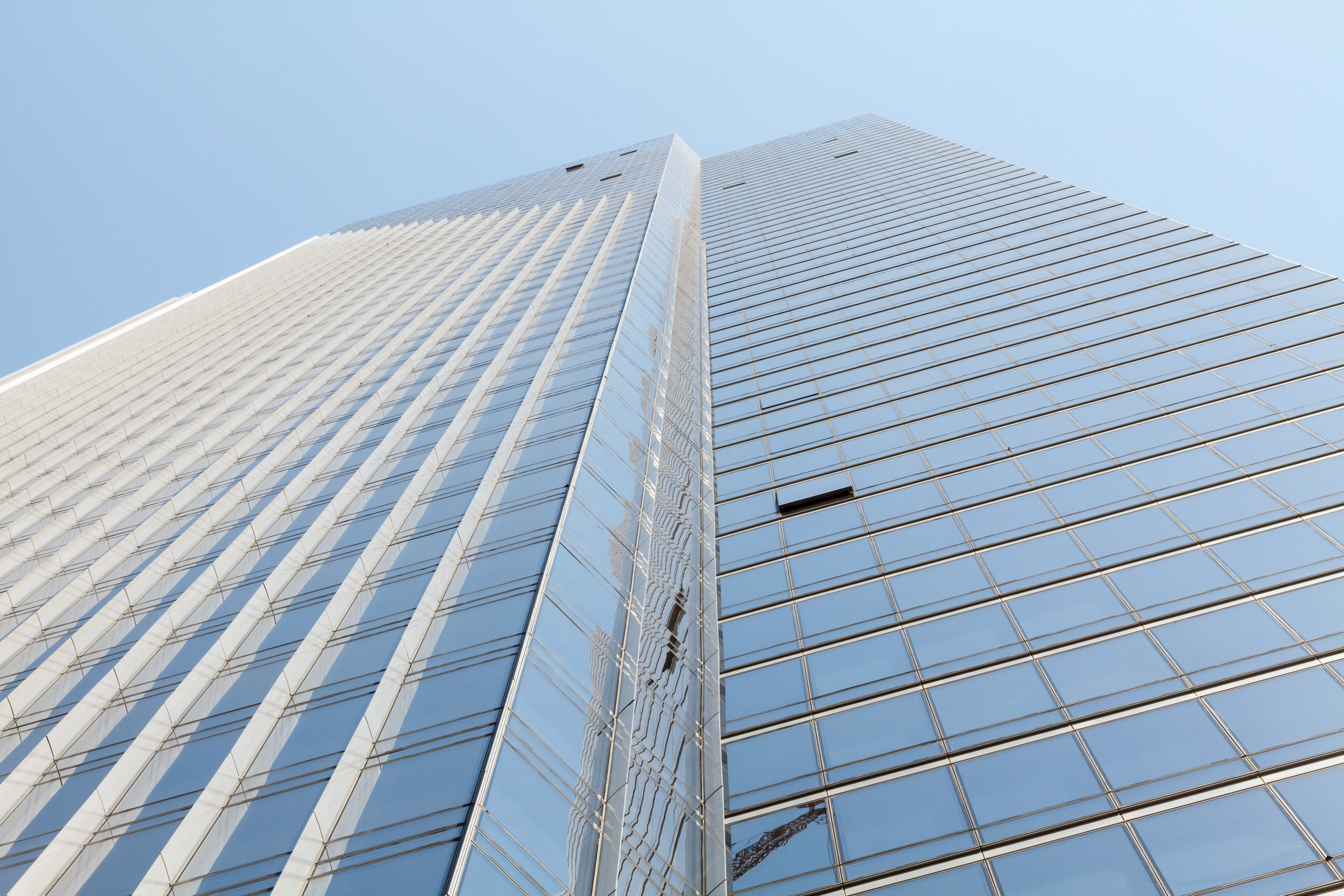
The Millennium Tower in August 2016

Millennium Partners first proposed the development in 2002 with 163 condominiums, 108 rentals and a 136-unit "extended stay" hotel. The project was approved in 2003 by the S.F. Planning Commission 4–1 and construction began in 2005. The only vote against the project came from Planning Commissioner Sue Lee. The development was the first high rise built downtown in 20 years. According to Modern Luxury, a proposed 52-story skyscraper at nearby 80 Natoma by developer Jack Myers which would also have a similar cast in place concrete construction, was rejected by the city's Department of Building Inspections (DBI) after an outside peer review. The Millennium Tower received no such scrutiny, since Millennium Partners would not submit to a peer review, as that study would have potentially delayed construction by years. Treadwell & Rollo, the geotechnical engineer for Millennium Tower, were also the geotechnical engineer for the scrapped project at 80 Natoma.

On September 6, 2010, Dan Goodwin, also known as SpiderDan and Skyscraperman, scaled the outside of the tower using suction cups. Following the climb, Goodwin was arrested by the San Francisco police, who charged him with trespassing and creating a public nuisance.

In 2013, the building sold its final unit, generating US$750 million in total sales, a 25 percent return on the estimated US$600 million in development costs.

== Building sinking and tilting ==
=== Discovery ===
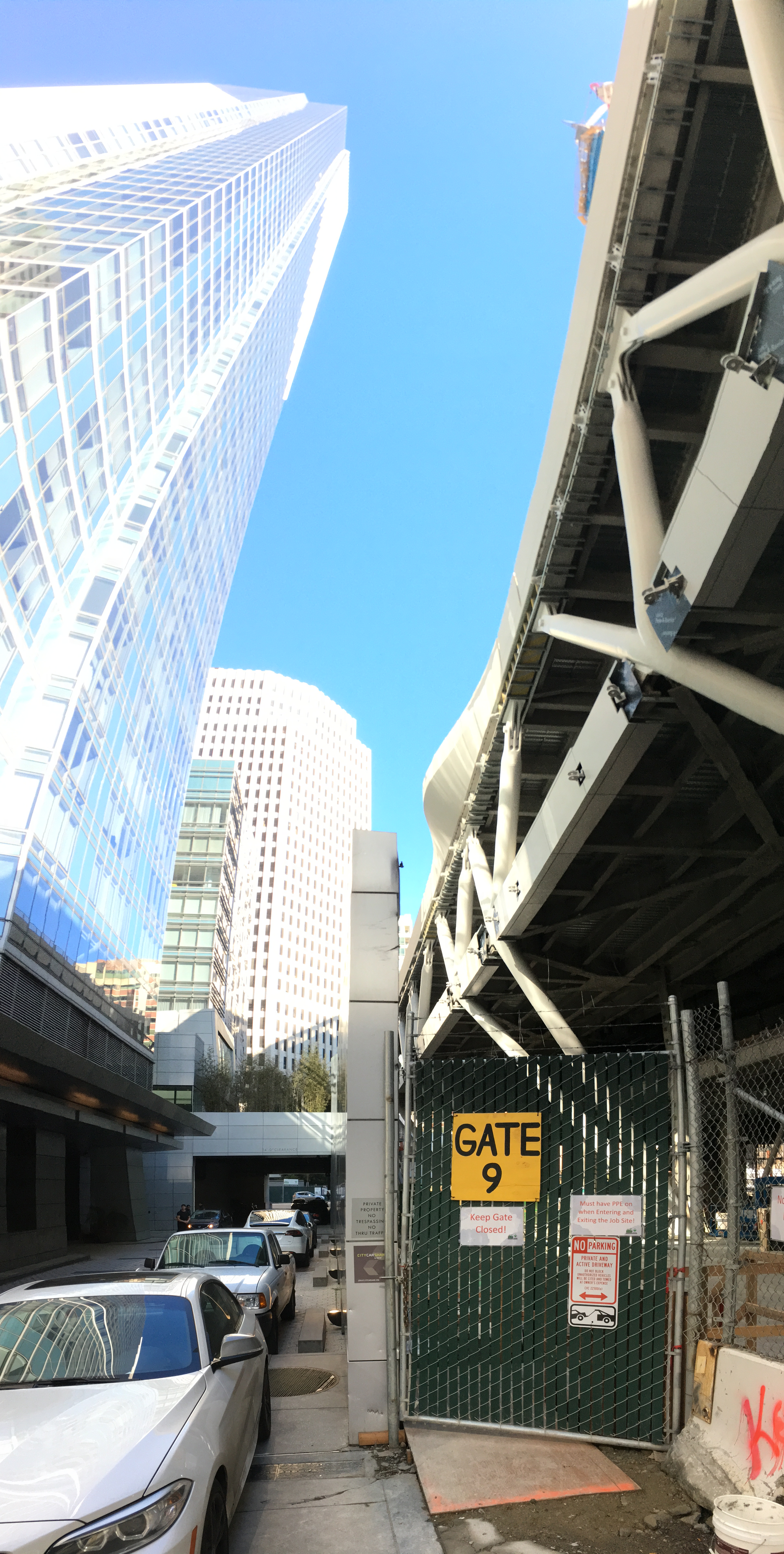
TTC construction next to the tower in 2017

After developers disclosed to authorities in 2015 that the building was sinking and tilting, the public was notified of the problem in 2016. Treadwell & Rollo's geotechnical design for the foundation of the main tower consists of a concrete slab built on 60-to-90-foot deep (18 to 27 m) concrete friction piles through the fill and young bay mud, and embedded into dense Colma sand (sand deposited during the last ice age 12,000–100,000 years ago and the penultimate layer before bedrock). A number of other buildings in 301 Mission Street's area have used similar systems, although due to varying earth conditions, others have pushed piles directly into the bedrock 200 feet (61 m) below. An examination in 2016 showed the building had sunk 16 inches (41 cm) with a two-inch (5.1 cm) tilt at the base and an approximate six-inch (15 cm) tilt at the top of the tower. The building is leaning toward the northwest, and this has caused cracks in the building's basement and the pavement surrounding the tower. As of 2018, the sinking had increased to 18 inches (46 cm) with a lean of 14 inches (36 cm). Measurements in 2022 show the tilt increased to 28 inches (71 cm), as measured from the roof.

The developer blames the sinking problem on the Transbay Joint Powers Authority (TJPA), who were responsible for construction of the neighboring Transbay Transit Center (TTC). However, the sinking problem had reportedly started before TTC construction even broke ground, and TJPA asserted the building had already settled 10 inches (25 cm), well past the original maximum vertical settling prediction of 5.5 inches (14 cm) in 20 years, by the time TJPA began removing the timber piles under the prior Transbay Terminal in 2011. The building's homeowners association, represented by general counsel Adrian Adams of Adams Stirling PLC, retained Dan Petrocelli of O’Melveny & Myers, to sue Webcor, Millennium Partners, and the TJPA. Originally, the homeowners association hired David Casselman to sue the TJPA instead of developer Millennium Partners, as Casselman noted that "inverse condemnation law allows residents to collect legal fees on top of any award, whereas suing the developer will steer up to 40 percent of any award to lawyers".

Another group of tenants who disagree with the homeowners association, led by resident and patent litigator Jerry Dodson, is suing Millennium Partners, the City of San Francisco, and the TJPA. In breaking with Casselman and the homeowners association, Dodson has regarded Millennium Partners as the responsible culprit.

In November 2016, the city of San Francisco filed suit against the tower's developer Mission Street Developers LLC, claiming that the developers withheld information on the sinking problems from potential apartment buyers. Mission Street Developers rejected the city's claims.

Sage Engineers has been hired by Millennium Partners to provide an engineering study on the sinking problem. Some experts have stated that the cost to fix the tilt could exceed the liability insurance held by Millennium Partners and the building's various construction vendors. If the TJPA is found to be at fault, San Francisco taxpayers could end up paying for the repairs.

As of 2017, a city inspection found that the building was still safe to occupy, though there was damage to the foundation and electrical system.

In March 2017, the homeowners association filed suit against Millennium Partners, Webcor, Handel Architects, Treadwell & Rollo, DeSimone Consulting Engineers, Arup, and Transbay Joint Powers Authority. They are seeking $200 million to cover repairs and damages.

In early September 2018, residents reported hearing various "creaking sounds". At around 2:30 a.m. on the morning of Saturday, September 8, 2018, residents reported hearing a loud "popping sound". On Sunday, the following day, a resident located in a corner unit on the 36th floor discovered a cracked window. The glass used in the building's windows and façade is rated to withstand hurricane-force winds, leading to concern that the crack was a symptom of a much larger structural failure.

Again in March 2023, the San Francisco Fire Department, as well as numerous first-hand witnesses, reported panes of glass falling from the tower during a windstorm. These panes fell and shattered near pedestrians on Mission Street. No injuries were reported.

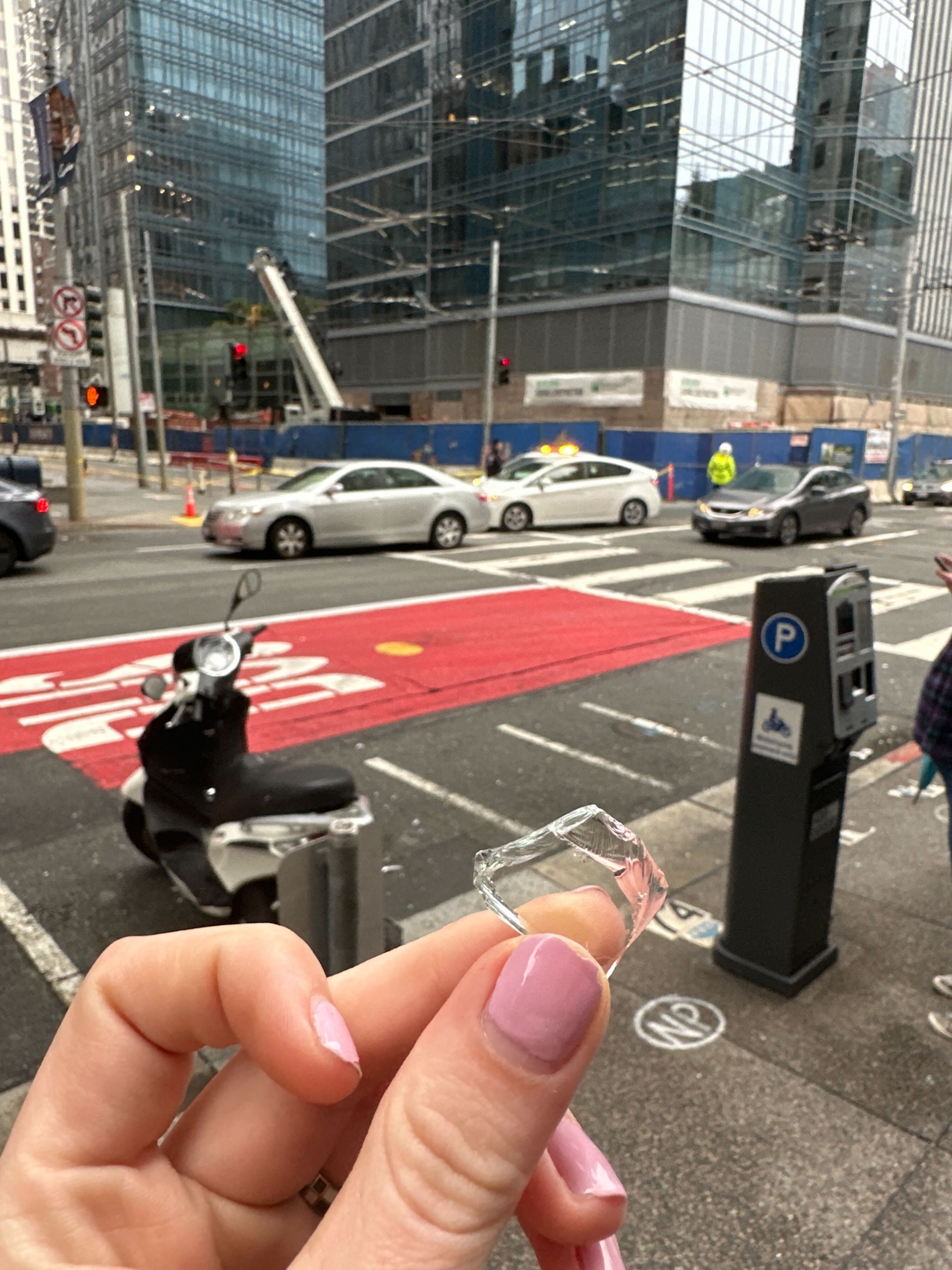
A pedestrian holds a glass fragment from the shattered window, found among others, nearly a block away from where the impact occurred in March 2023.

=== Underpinning Millennium Tower ===
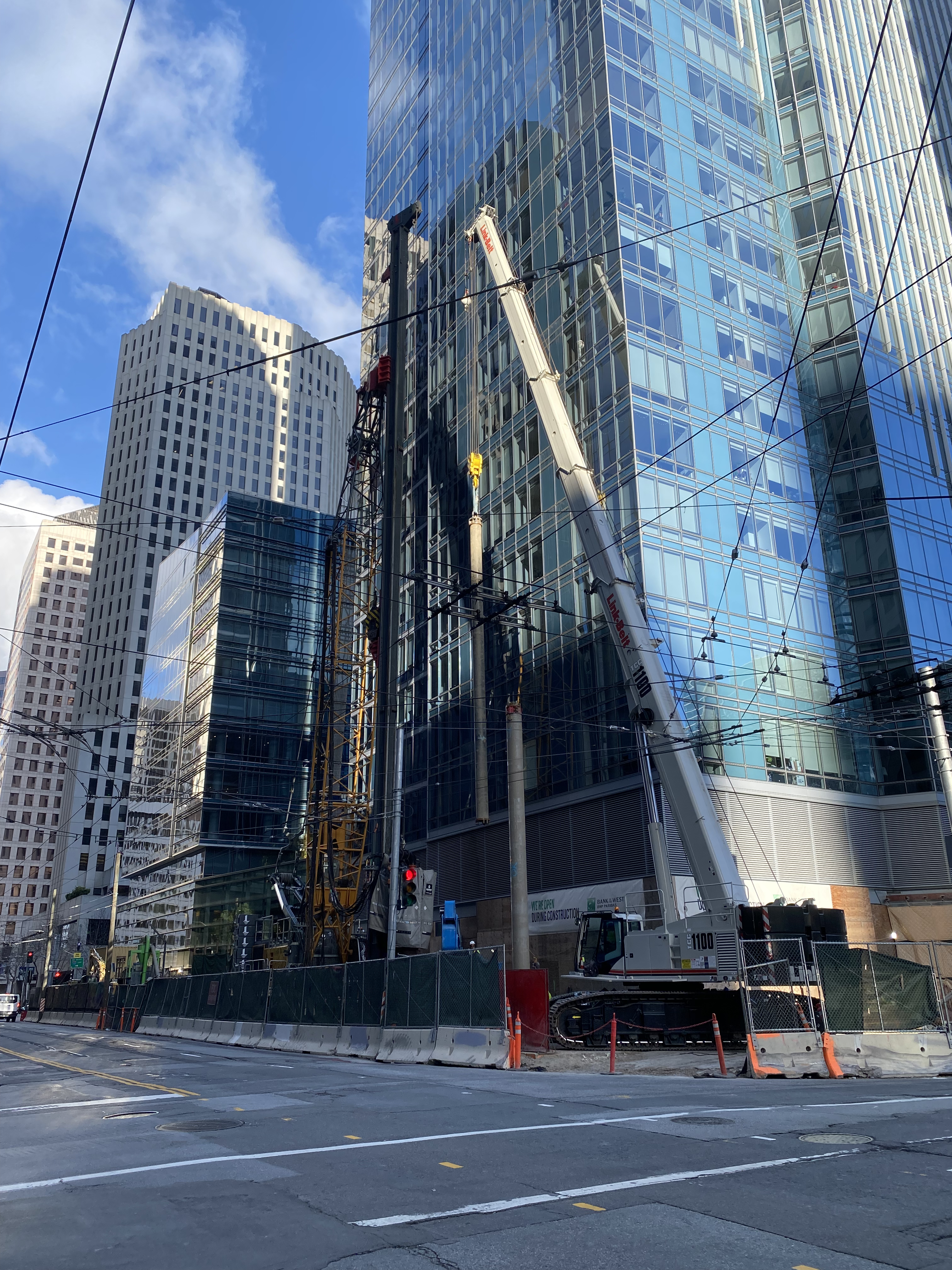
New pile being installed at the Millennium Tower

On December 4, 2018, Ronald Hamburger, the senior principal engineer at Simpson Gumpertz & Heger, revealed in a press release a final resolution to the Millennium Tower's tilting and sinking problem by underpinning the building. The proposed solution would have involved the installation of 52 piles along the north and west sides of the tower beneath the sidewalk that reach down 250 ft (76.2 m) into the bedrock of downtown San Francisco and be tied with the original 60–90 ft (18.3–27.4 m) deep foundation piles. It was estimated that about 50% of the tilt could be evened out over a period of 10 years as the south and eastern sides of the building would come back into re-alignment with the now sunken north and western sides of the building, at which point the remaining south and eastern sides of the building can be anchored to the bedrock, permanently resolving the tilting and sinking of the building. The fix was estimated to cost about $100 million., with the lawsuits consolidated into a global agreement and an expected start time in mid-November 2020. Funding for the fix included $30 million from taxpayers via the Transbay Joint Powers Authority.

In November 2020, the $100 million "perimeter pile upgrade" repair project began with a planned 52 pilings to be sunk to bedrock. These pilings would be tied to the existing foundation to mitigate further sinking. The remediation plan required extensive permitting, phased construction, and ongoing monitoring. The building's tilting problem came under renewed scrutiny following the deadly collapse of Champlain Towers South in Surfside, Florida, in June 2021. The repair project was halted in August 2021 after monitoring indicated that the building had unexpectedly sunk an additional inch on the Fremont Street side after 39 of the 52 piles were installed. The one inch drop translates to an additional 5 inches of lean on the 58th floor. On September 10, 2021, San Francisco city officials told Millennium Tower management to not resume construction work until the city reviews an updated construction approach. In February 2022, Hamburger had also discovered that the tower had moved one inch away from an adjacent building containing the parking garage. This gap does not pose a structural safety hazard and is unlikely to worsen during repair work, but reversing the shift would allow the reopening of one of the parking garage elevators.

In August 2022, San Francisco building officials agreed to a scaled-down plan to allow engineers to do the work needed to support one corner of the building. The revised plan relies on just 18 piles sunk to bedrock, instead of the original 52, to anchor the high-rise to bedrock on the two sides where it leans and tilts the most, on Mission and Fremont streets. With the scaled-down plan, the fix was completed in June 2023 and was able to immediately arrest the increased leaning and even reversed the lean by 1/4 inch and then a full inch in 2023.

As of February 2024, there was concern that the building was sinking slightly in the center, instead of at the sides opposite the implemented fix, as hoped for. While stopping further leaning and reversing the lean can be considered an engineering success, the engineering team's model had predicted up to four inches of recovery within the first six months of completion of the project. The tower's lean is still expected to continue to lessen, but slower than predicted, and the sinking in the center introduces new longer-term risks and complications. As of June 2025, the lean had been further reduced an additional 1 inch to a total of 2 inches, but market uncertainty remains with the tower still leaning about 28 inches, and recent sales of condo units reflecting a steep loss for the original owners. Still, alternate interpretations note that these numbers do not solely reflect on the building's state but also on an overall weak local real estate market, and that the facts that costly units are being sold at all, and that banks are now willing to underwrite mortgages for said units, point to a possible turnaround in the market's perception of the building's future potential.

The retrofit project has been recognized within the structural engineering community for its complexity and technical innovation. In 2025, the Perimeter Pile Upgrade was honored with a Structure of the Year award by the National Council of Structural Engineers Associations’ Structural Engineering Excellence Awards, acknowledging it in the Forensic/Retrofit/Rehabilitation category.

== Awards ==
The building has garnered several awards from several engineering and architectural organizations.

- 2008: American Concrete Institute Awards, Northern California – Construction
- 2008: Concrete Industry Board – Roger H. CIB Award of Merit
- 2009: American Society of Civil Engineers, Region 9 – Structural Engineering Project of the Year
- 2008: American Society of Civil Engineers, San Francisco Section – Outstanding Structural Engineering Project
- 2009: Metal Architecture Magazine – April 2009 edition Top Honor
- 2009: California Construction – Outstanding Project Management
- 2009: California Construction – Multi-family/Residential, Award of Merit
- 2010: San Francisco Business Times – Deal of the Year Award
- 2010: San Francisco Chamber of Commerce Excellence in Business Awards – Building San Francisco Award
- 2025: Structural Engineering Excellence Awards – Project of the Year

== Notable residents ==
- Kevin Durant
- Joe Montana
- Hunter Pence
- Tom Perkins

== Gallery ==
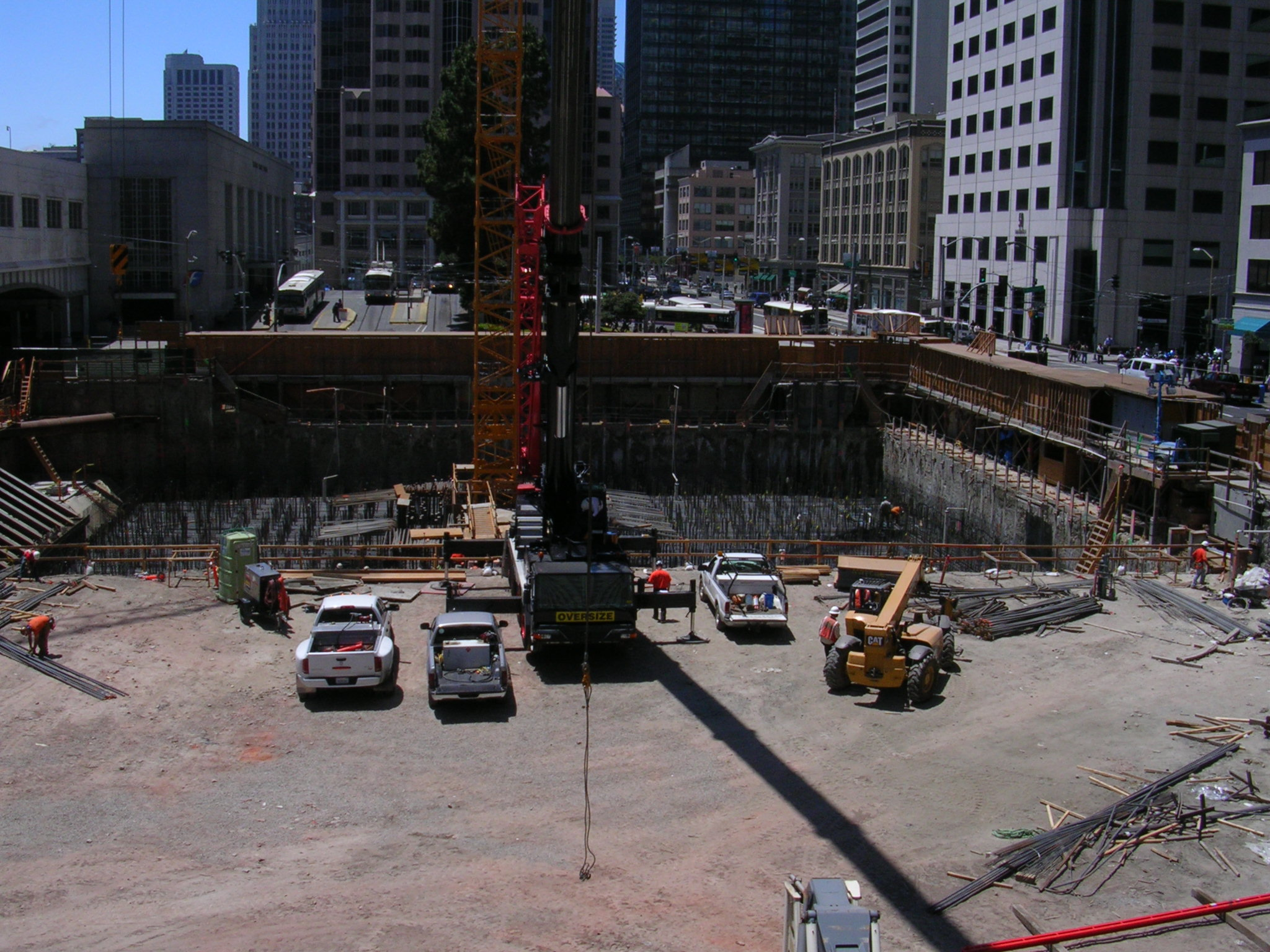
Early June 2006

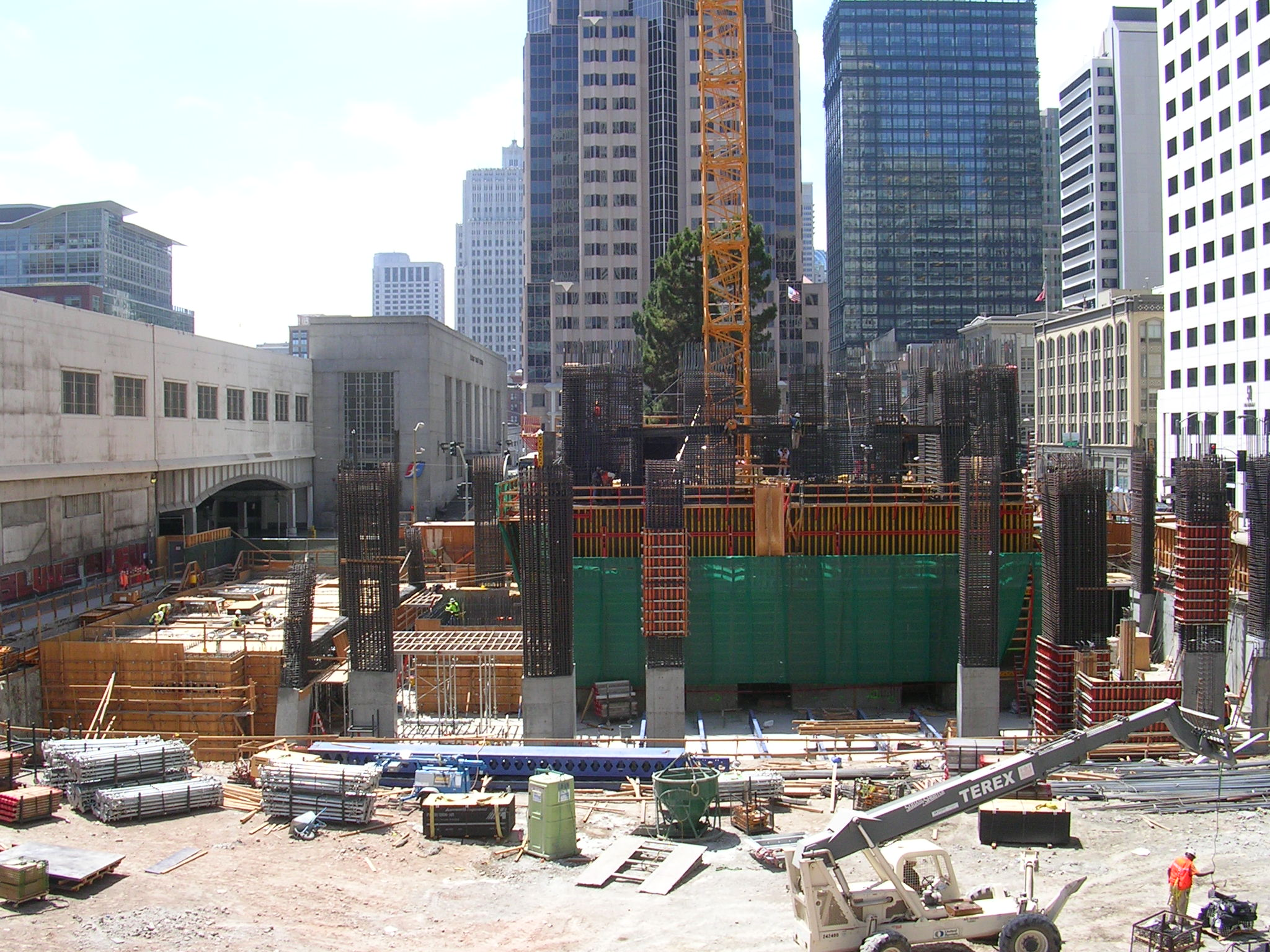
Mid August 2006

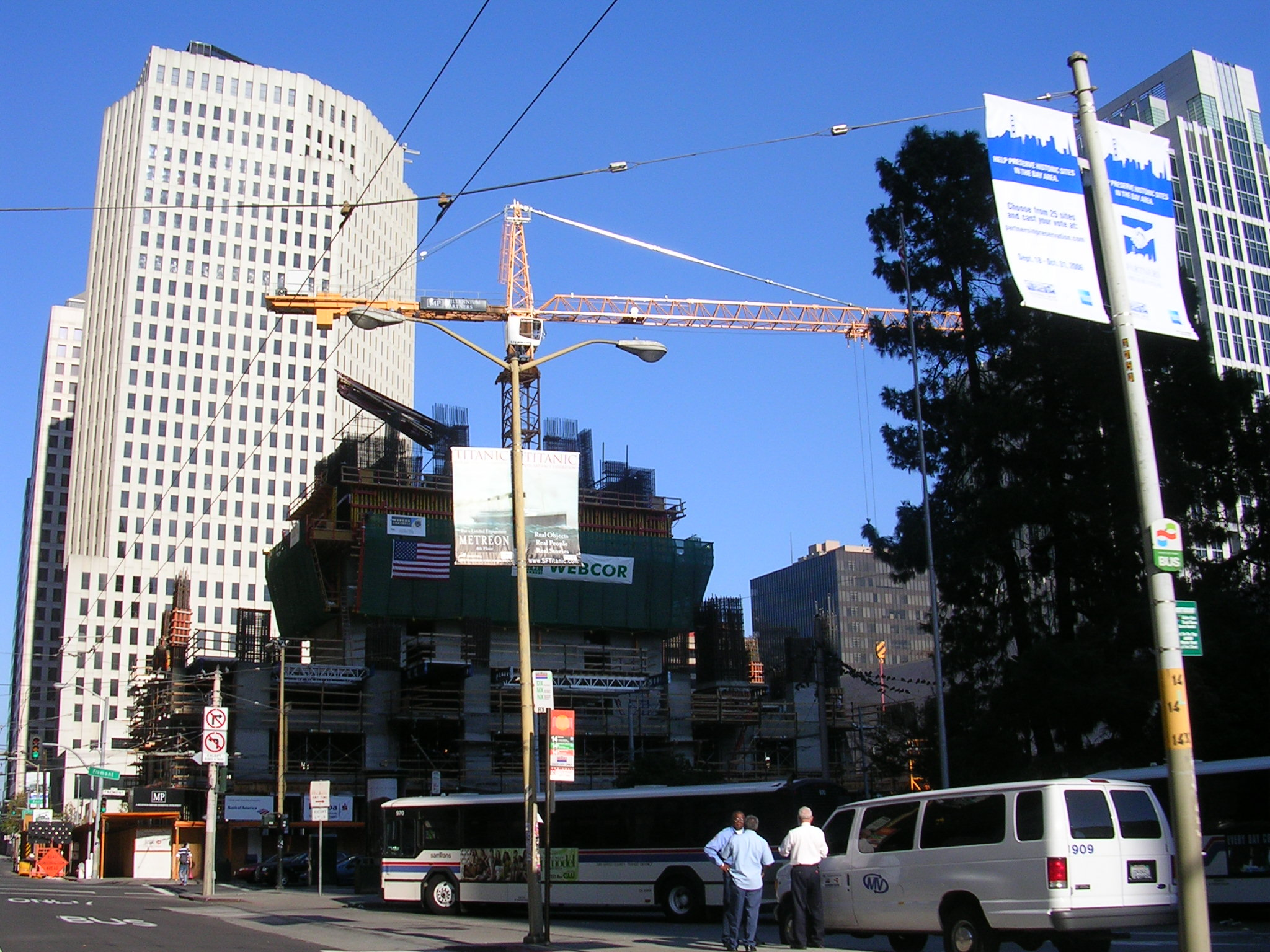
Late October 2006

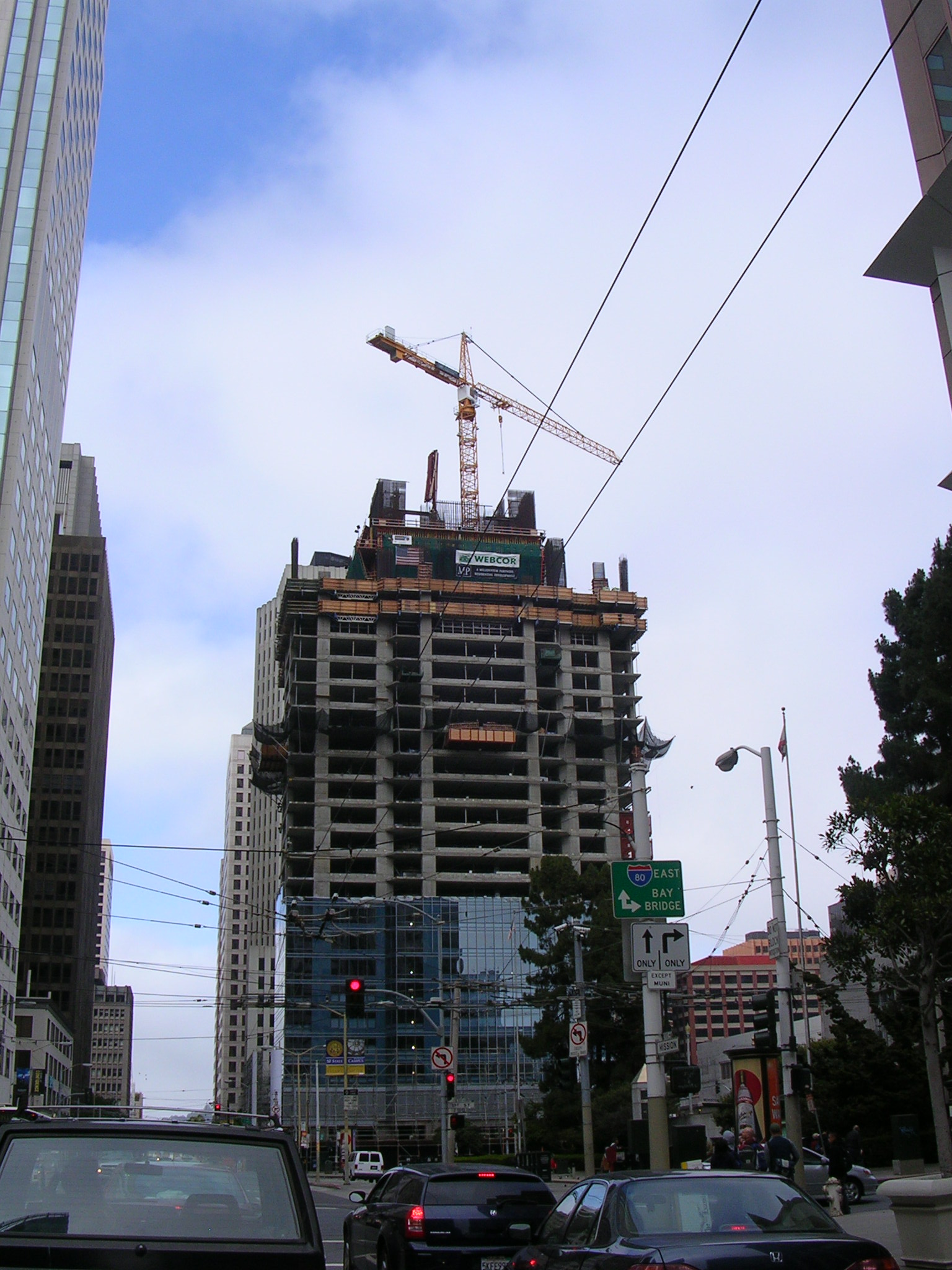
May 2007

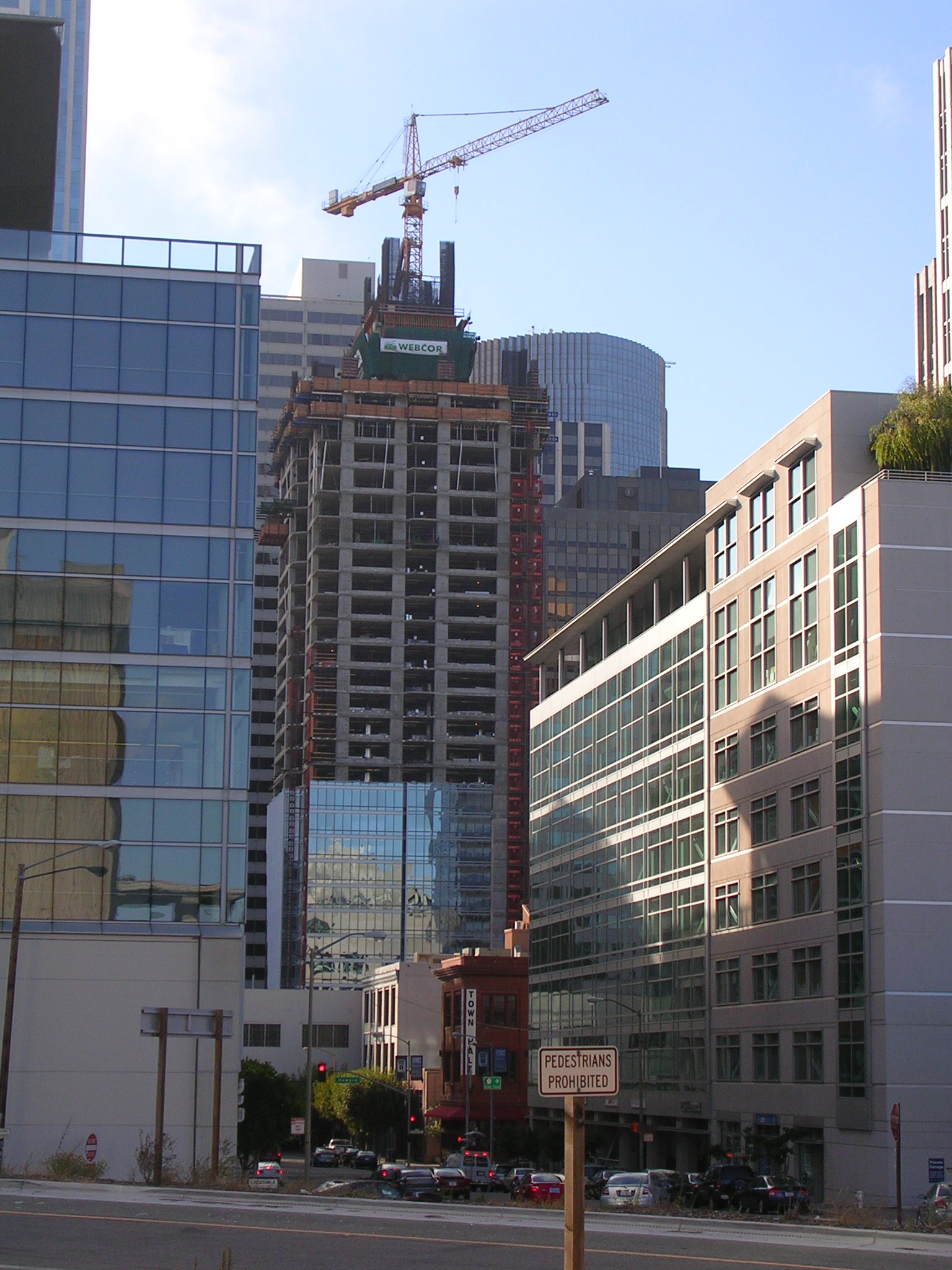
Mid-July 2007

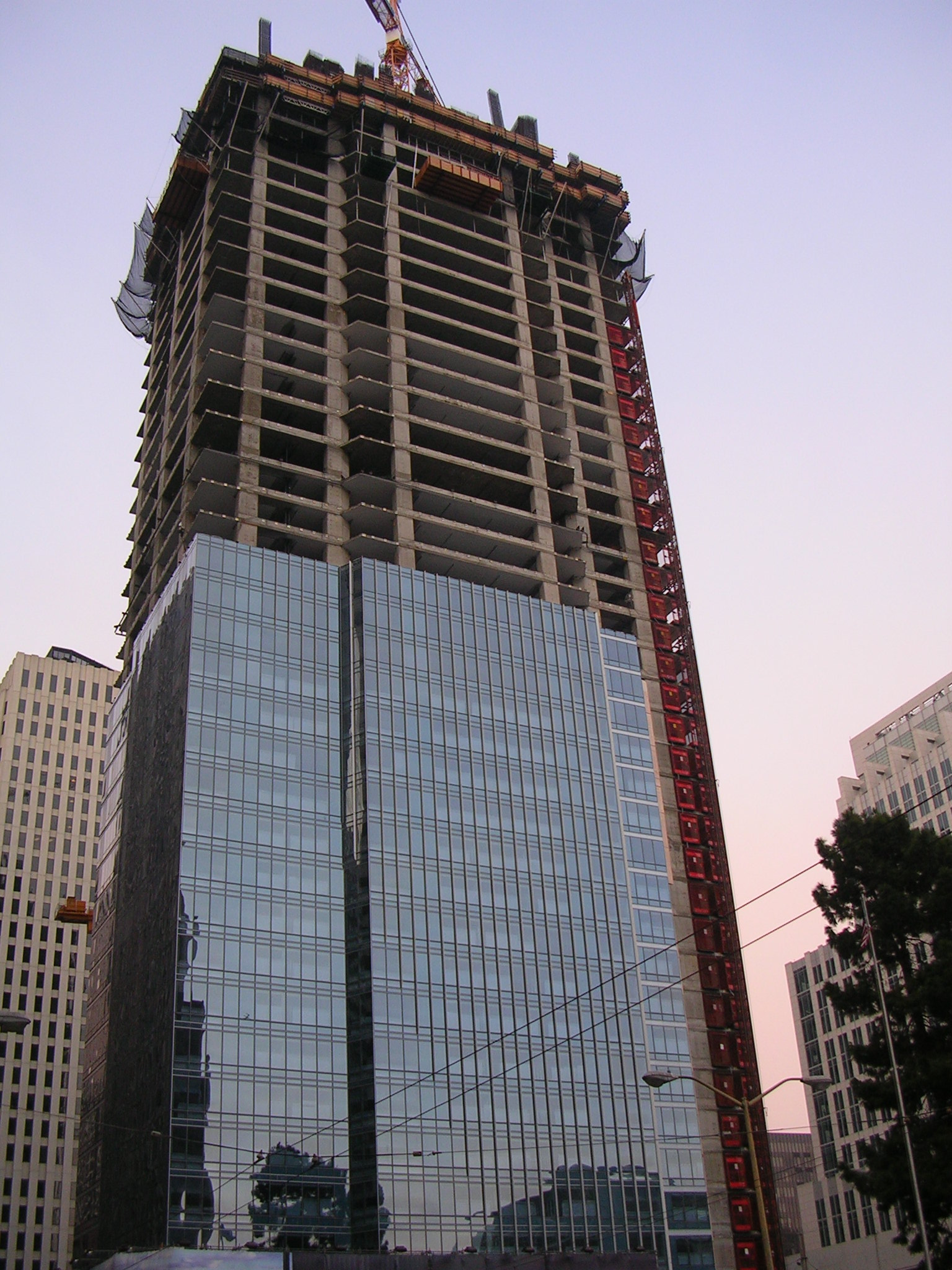
September 2007

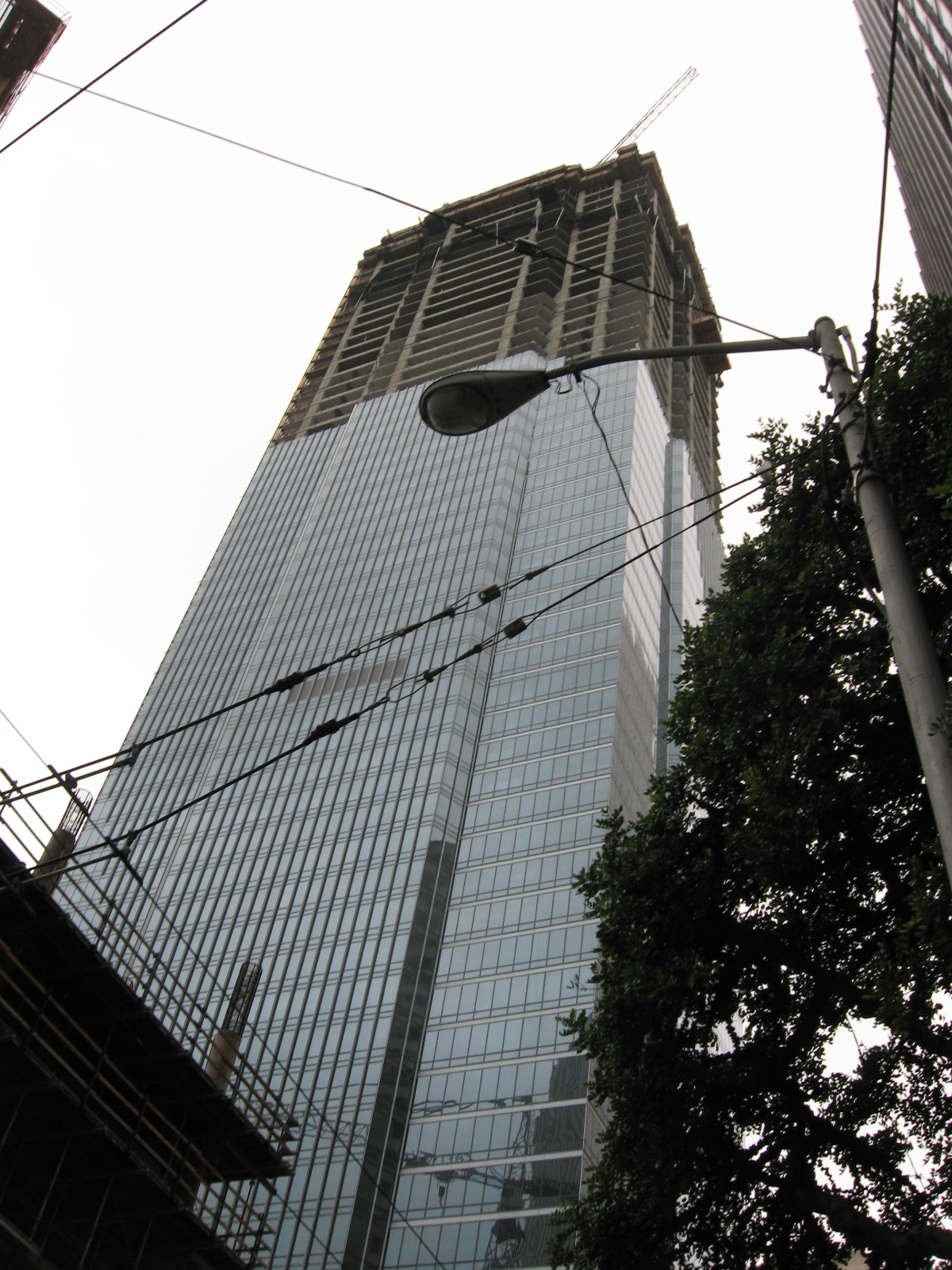
February 2008

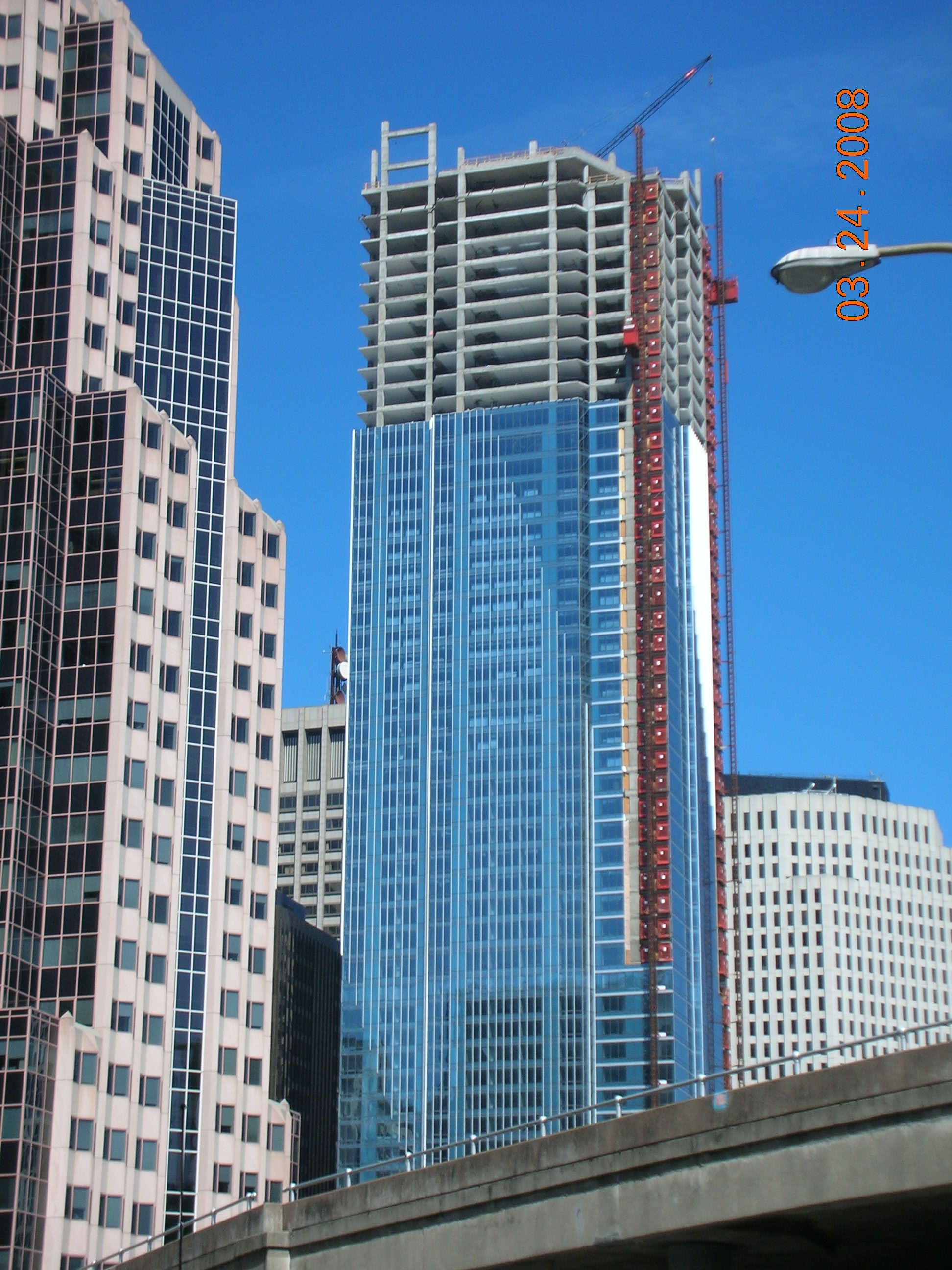
March 2008

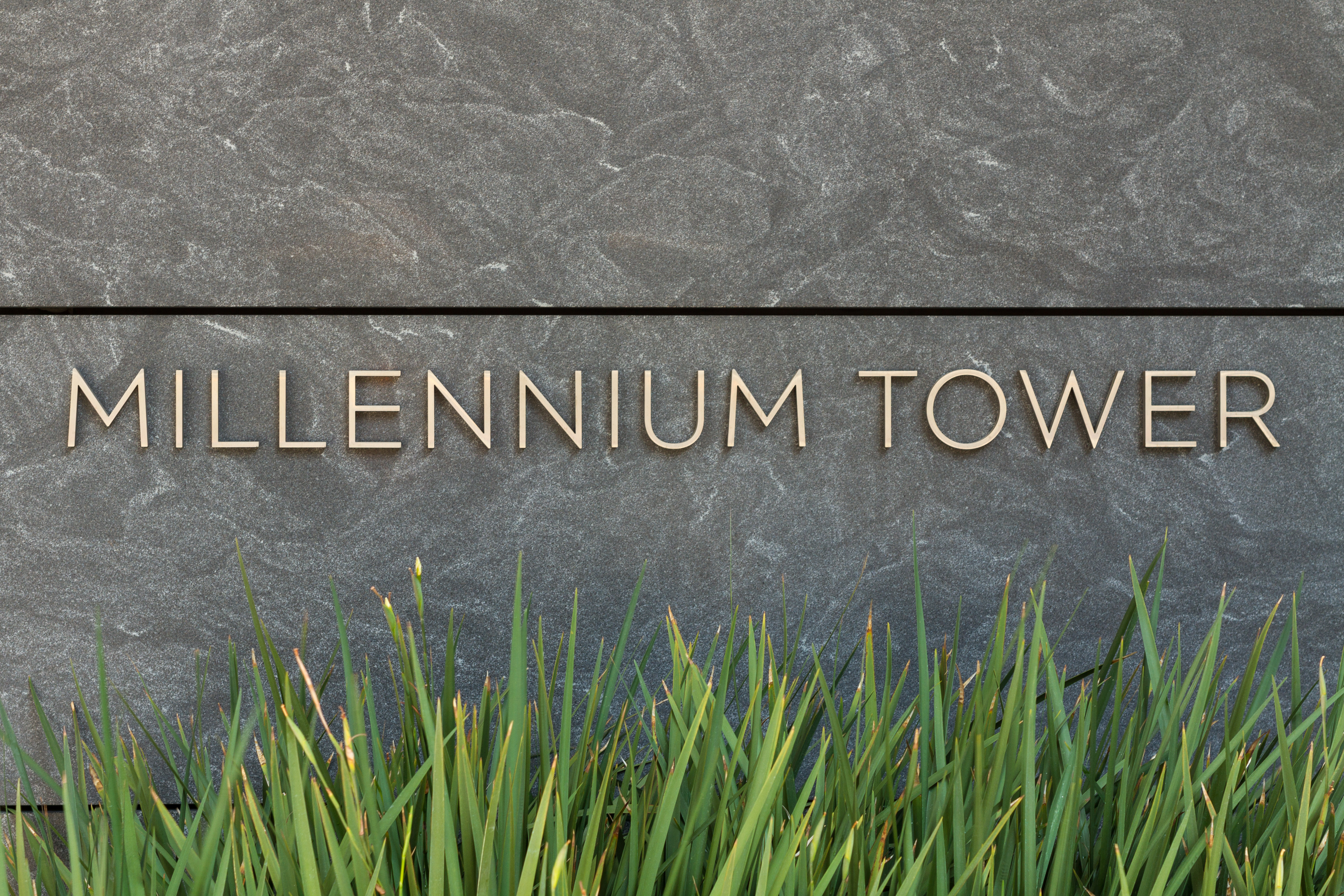
Sign on the South facade

== See also ==
- List of tallest buildings in San Francisco
