= 101 Second Street =

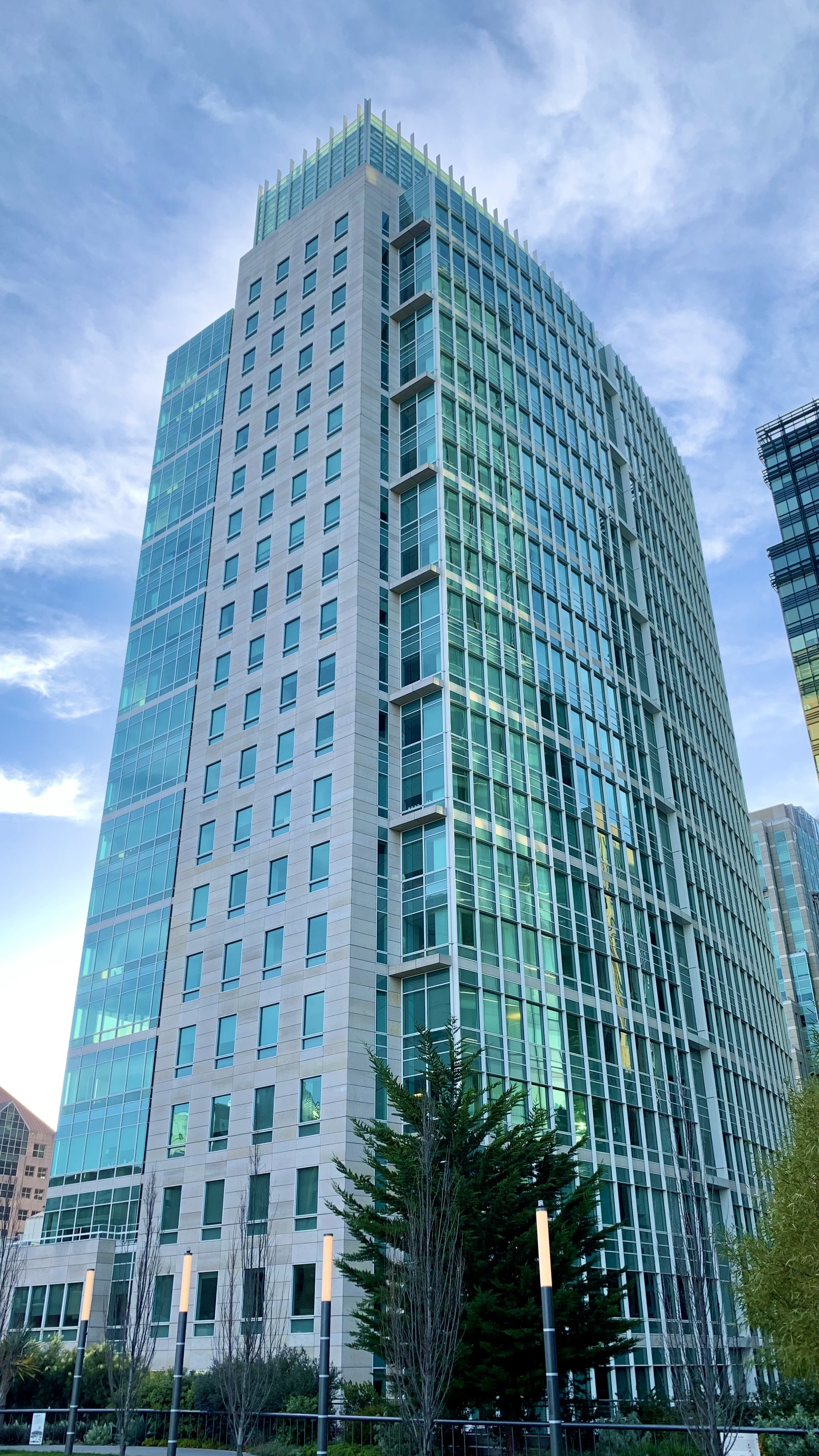
- View from Salesforce Park in 2021

- Location within San Francisco 101 Second Street (California) 101 Second Street (the United States)

General information
- Type: Commercial offices
- Location: 101 Second Street; San Francisco, California
- Coordinates: 37.788139°N 122.399056°W
- Completed: 2000
- Owner: Invesco Real Estate

Height
- Roof: 108 m (354 ft)

Technical details
- Floor count: 26
- Floor area: 388,000 sq ft (36,000 m^{2})

Design and construction
- Architect: Skidmore, Owings & Merrill
- Developer: Cousins Properties, Inc. Myers Development Co.
- Main contractor: Hathaway Dinwiddie

101 Second Street is an office tower located in the South of Market district in San Francisco, California on Mission Street. The 108 m (354 ft) building was completed in 2000 and has 26 floors with 388,000 sq ft (36,000 m^{2}) for offices. It is known for its glass-clad, four-story atrium which functions as public space. Its art pavilion has included commissions by painter Charles Arnoldi and sculptor Larry Bell. On warm days, the building at street level is opened.

== History ==
101 Second Street was developed by a partnership of Cousins Properties Incorporated and Myers Development Company, along with 55 Second Street. Both properties were sold to an affiliate of Hines Interests Limited Partnership in September 2004 for US$282 million, of which US$144 million was for 101 Second Street. Hines sold 101 Second Street to Invesco Real Estate for about $297 million in January 2014.

As of May 2023, during what the San Francisco Chronicle described as "Downtown San Francisco['s] worst office vacancy crisis on record," 101 Second Street had a vacancy rate of 21.1%.

== Tenants ==
- King & Spalding LLP
- Reed Smith
- Ziff Davis Media, Inc.
- Moss Adams LLP
- Nexant, Inc.
- The Punak Group
- Aspiriant
- CV Starr & Co.
- Stupski Foundation
- Clyde & Co
- Prosper Marketplace
- ServiceNow Inc
- Pramp Inc
- HashiCorp
- Canadian Imperial Bank of Commerce

== See also ==
- List of tallest buildings in San Francisco
