= JPMorgan Chase Building (San Francisco) =

JPMorganChase Center
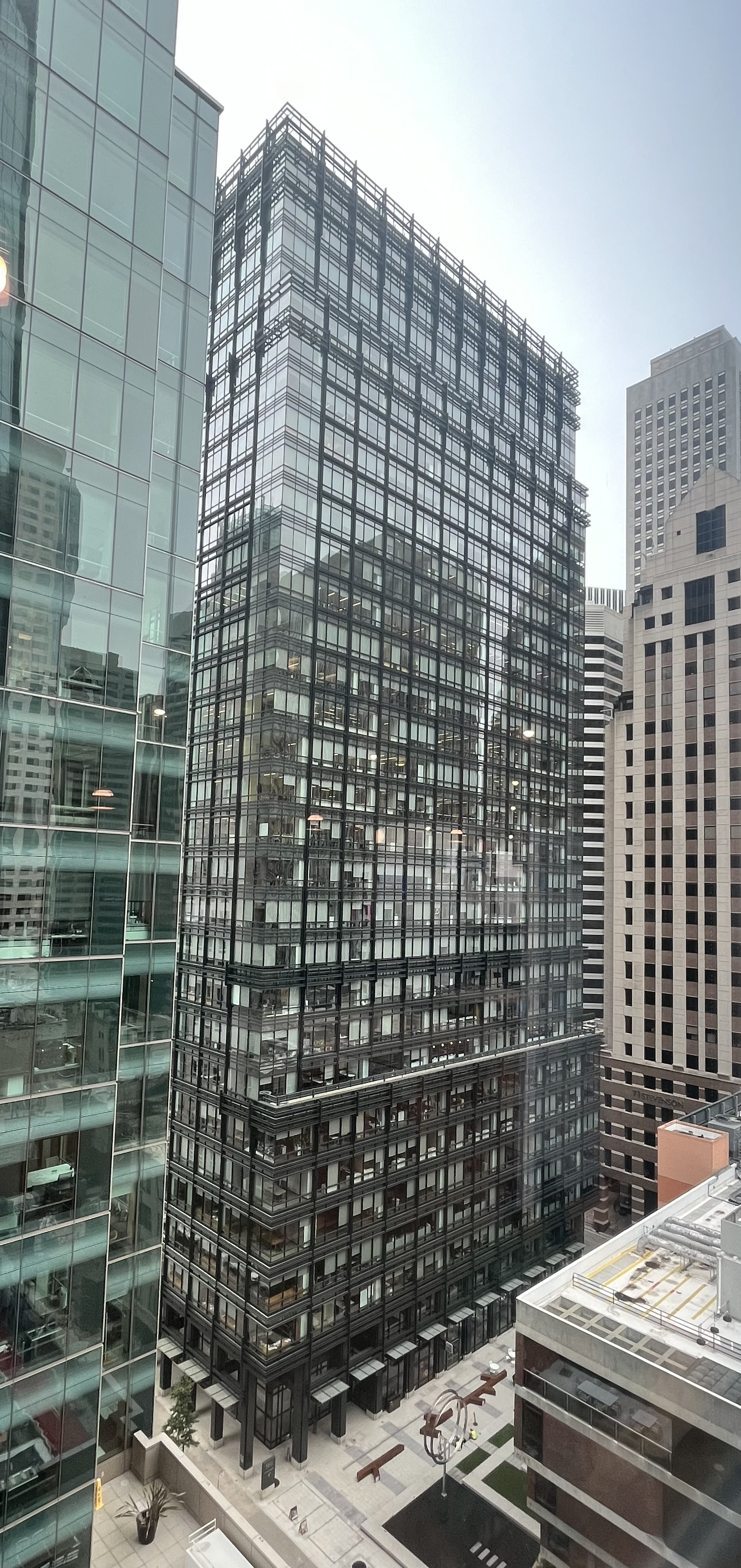
- The building in 2024

- Location within San Francisco

General information
- Type: Commercial offices
- Location: 560–584 Mission Street; San Francisco, California
- Coordinates: 37.788778°N 122.399444°W
- Construction started: 2000
- Completed: 2002
- Owner: CommonWealth Partners LLC
- Operator: CommonWealth Partners LLC

Height
- Roof: 128.02 m (420.0 ft)

Technical details
- Floor count: 31
- Floor area: 655,000 sq ft (60,900 m^{2})

Design and construction
- Architects: César Pelli & Associates Architects; Kendall/Heaton Associates Inc.
- Developer: Hines Interests Limited Partnership
- Main contractor: Turner Construction

The JPMorganChase Center is an office building in San Francisco, California, 560–584 Mission Street, on the border between South of Market and the Financial District. Designed by architect César Pelli, the building stands 128.02 m (420.0 ft) and has about 655,000 square feet (60,900 m^{2}) of office space. It also has two levels of underground parking and a large plaza. About 400,000 sq ft (37,000 m^{2}) of the building is leased to the major tenant JPMorgan Chase. This is one of many new highrise projects completed or under construction on Mission Street since 2000.

== Construction and design ==
SF Curbed describes the building, designed by Cesar Pelli, as a "circa-2002, 31-story minimalist tower wrapped in black steel." The 31-story building is located at 560 Mission Street. Pelli took visual inspiration from the Hallidie Building.

Says SF Gate, the plaza at 560 Mission Street as "outdoor slip of manicured heaven: terraces of grass, groves of bamboo, potted maples in between. Plus plenty of tables and a circular metal sculpture turning gently above a thin sheet of water," saying it has " only bamboo, Japanese maple and grass growing, along with a granite-lined pool and granite and stainless-steel sculpture."

== Plaza ==
The building's public space has been noted in the press, called one of the "best privately owned open places" in the city by Curbed.

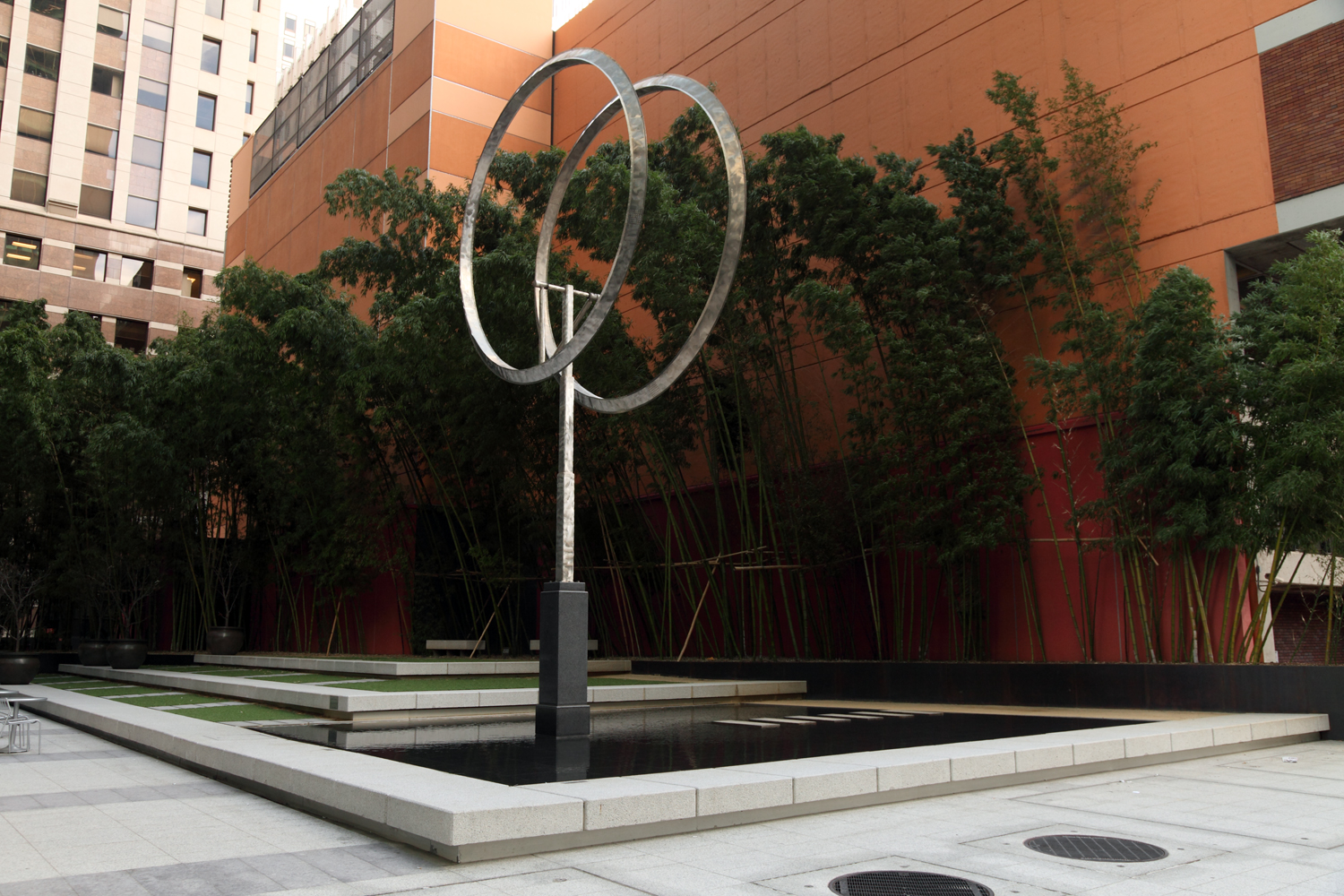
Parklet at foot of building

The Privately Owned Public Open Space at the foot of the tower consists of a parklet containing a water feature with seating, a bamboo grove and the kinetic sculpture Annular Eclipse by George Rickey.

Landscape design for the parklet was done by Christian Lemon at the firm Hart Howerton.

== Tenants ==
- JPMorgan Chase
- Delta Dental
- Ernst & Young
- Arup
- Munger, Tolles & Olson

== See also ==
- San Francisco's tallest buildings
