= Four Seasons Hotel, San Francisco =

Four Seasons Hotel San Francisco
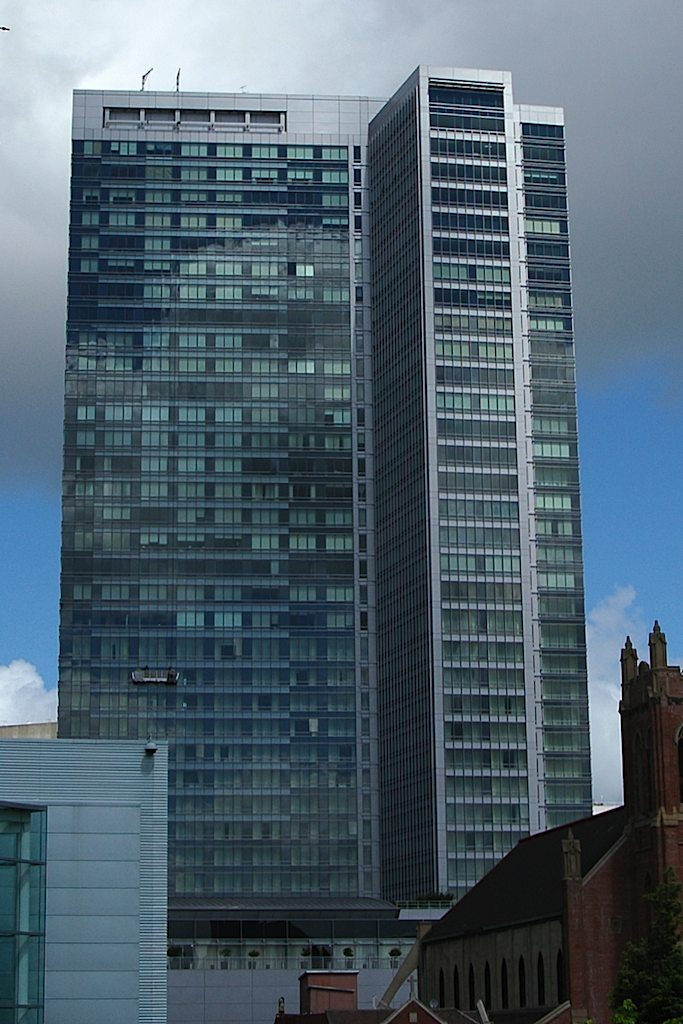

- Location within San Francisco Location within California Location within the United States
- Alternative names: Four Seasons Hotel & Residences; Four Season Residences

General information
- Type: Hotel; Residential condominiums
- Location: 757 Market Street; San Francisco, California; 94103
- Coordinates: 37.786361°N 122.404417°W
- Completed: 2001
- Owner: Blackstone Inc.

Height
- Roof: 121 m (397 ft)

Technical details
- Floor count: 40

Design and construction
- Architects: Gary Edward Handel & Associates; Del Campo & Maru Architects
- Developer: Millennium Partners
- Structural engineer: DeSimone Consulting Engineers
- Main contractor: Bovis Lend Lease

The Four Seasons Hotel San Francisco & Residences is a 121 m (397 ft) mixed-use development at 757 Market Street in San Francisco, California, United States, near the Moscone Center. Completed in January 2001, the tower was the first skyscraper of the 21st century to be completed in the city.

== Specifications ==
The five-star hotel has been operated by Four Seasons Hotels and Resorts since 2001, contains 277 guest rooms and retail stores, and includes 142 luxury condominiums on the upper floors. The hotel has a restaurant called MKT Restaurant & Bar overlooking Market Street, as well as an Equinox Sports Club.

Non-linear viscous dampers located at the top of the hotel tower help dampen some of the wind sway due to powerful winds off the Pacific Ocean.

For many years, it was the only Four Seasons location in San Francisco, but was joined by two other properties in 2021, one located a block away at 706 Mission Street and the other at 222 Sansome Street, known as Four Seasons Hotel San Francisco at Embarcadero.

The hotel was sold by Westbrook Partners to investment group Blackstone Inc. in December 2025 for $130 million.

== Notable residents ==
As of 2013, then-CEO of Yahoo! Marissa Mayer was living in the 38th-floor penthouse suite at the Four Seasons Hotel with her husband and growing family of three children, as well as live-in domestic help.

== See also ==
- InterContinental Hotel San Francisco
- St. Regis Museum Tower
- W Hotel San Francisco
