= InterContinental San Francisco =

Hotel in San Francisco, California

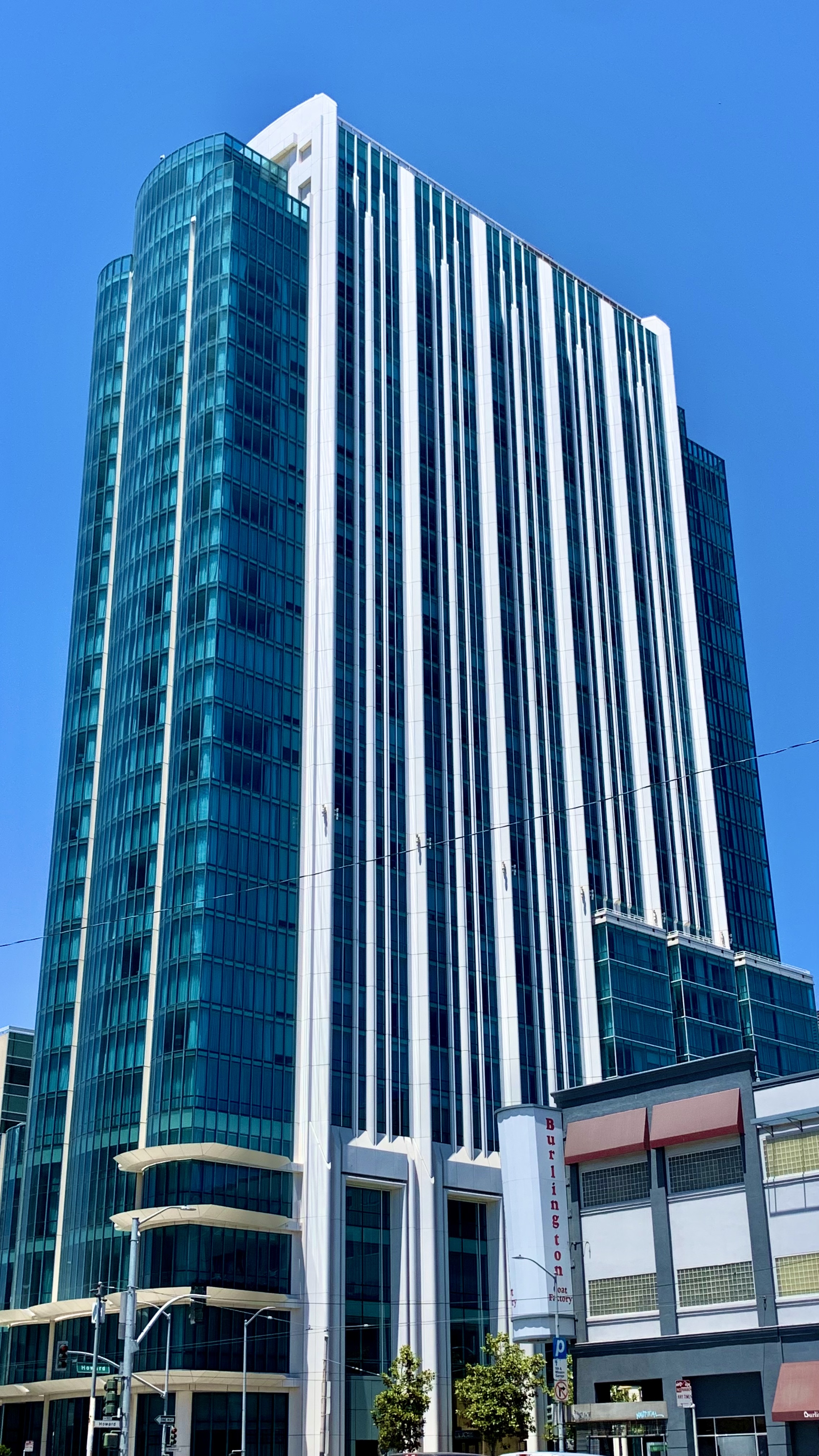
- In 2021

- Location within San Francisco InterContinental San Francisco (California) InterContinental San Francisco (the United States)
- Hotel chain: InterContinental

General information
- Location: United States, 888 Howard Street; San Francisco, California
- Coordinates: 37.7818°N 122.4047°W
- Opening: 3 February 2008
- Operator: InterContinental Hotels Group

Height
- Height: 103.63 m (340 ft)

Technical details
- Floor count: 32
- Floor area: 564,614 sq ft (52,454.4 m^{2})

Design and construction
- Architects: Patri Merker Architects; Hornberger + Worstell
- Developer: Hampshire Properties; Continental Development Corporation

Other information
- Number of rooms: 554
- Number of suites: 14
- Number of restaurants: Bar 888; Luce Restaurant and Bar
- Parking: 180 (valet only)

Website
- www.intercontinentalsanfrancisco.com

The InterContinental San Francisco is a high-rise hotel at 888 Howard Street in the South of Market district of San Francisco, California. The 103.63 m (340 ft) 32-story hotel has 550 hotel rooms, and is operated by the InterContinental Hotels Group. The hotel is next to the Moscone West Center, completed in 2003. The hotel opened on February 28, 2008. There is a two-level underground garage and a six-floor podium housing hotel amenities.

== Description ==
The US$200 million hotel was designed by Patri Merker Architects, and Hornberger + Worstell with Webcor Builders as primary contractors and with Architectural Glass and Aluminum serving as the Glazing Contractor. At night, the tower's southern facade is illuminated, lighting the corner of Howard and 5th Streets, and is visible throughout the city and from miles away. The curtain wall system consists of glass and metal panels. A restaurant is located at street level and a health club including a swimming pool is located on the sixth floor. A series of terraces provides open space areas, outdoor activities and separation from adjacent buildings allowing natural light and ventilation to reach the north side of the building.

Alberto Bertoli of Patri Merker Architect explained that he had designed the building with its surroundings in mind, in particular the nearby Moscone Center: "We wanted to break down the rhythm, but also have a component of the building related to the mass of the Moscone." The San Francisco Chronicle's architecture critic John King reported generally adverse reactions to the building after its opening, which he explained by its "aesthetics [being] wrong for San Francisco" and more suitable for the Las Vegas Strip. Nevertheless, King defended it as "a slender building with clean lines and a relaxed presence - and a sharp-looking curtain wall."

The building, with its 550 rooms, was the largest hotel to open in San Francisco since the 1,500 room San Francisco Marriott inaugurated in 1989. With the InterContinental open, the hotel operator was planning to apply for LEED Certification. The InterContinental San Francisco received an Award of Merit in the Hospitality category of the Best of 2008 Awards from California Construction.

== Amenities ==
The hotel offers a Michelin-starred restaurant, Luce, and a companion bar, Bar 888, that spotlights Grappa tastings and cocktails, and 24-hour in-room dining.

Other amenities include a fitness center, an indoor lap pool, Jacuzzi, a business center, and pets are allowed with fee and weight restriction in some rooms. The conference center contains two large ballrooms, an executive board room and 21 meeting rooms.

== See also ==
- Four Seasons Hotel
- W Hotel San Francisco
- St. Regis Museum Tower
- InterContinental Mark Hopkins San Francisco
- List of tallest buildings in San Francisco
