= Four Seasons Private Residences at 706 Mission Street =

Skyscraper in San Francisco, California, U.S.

Four Seasons Private Residences at 706 Mission Street, San Francisco
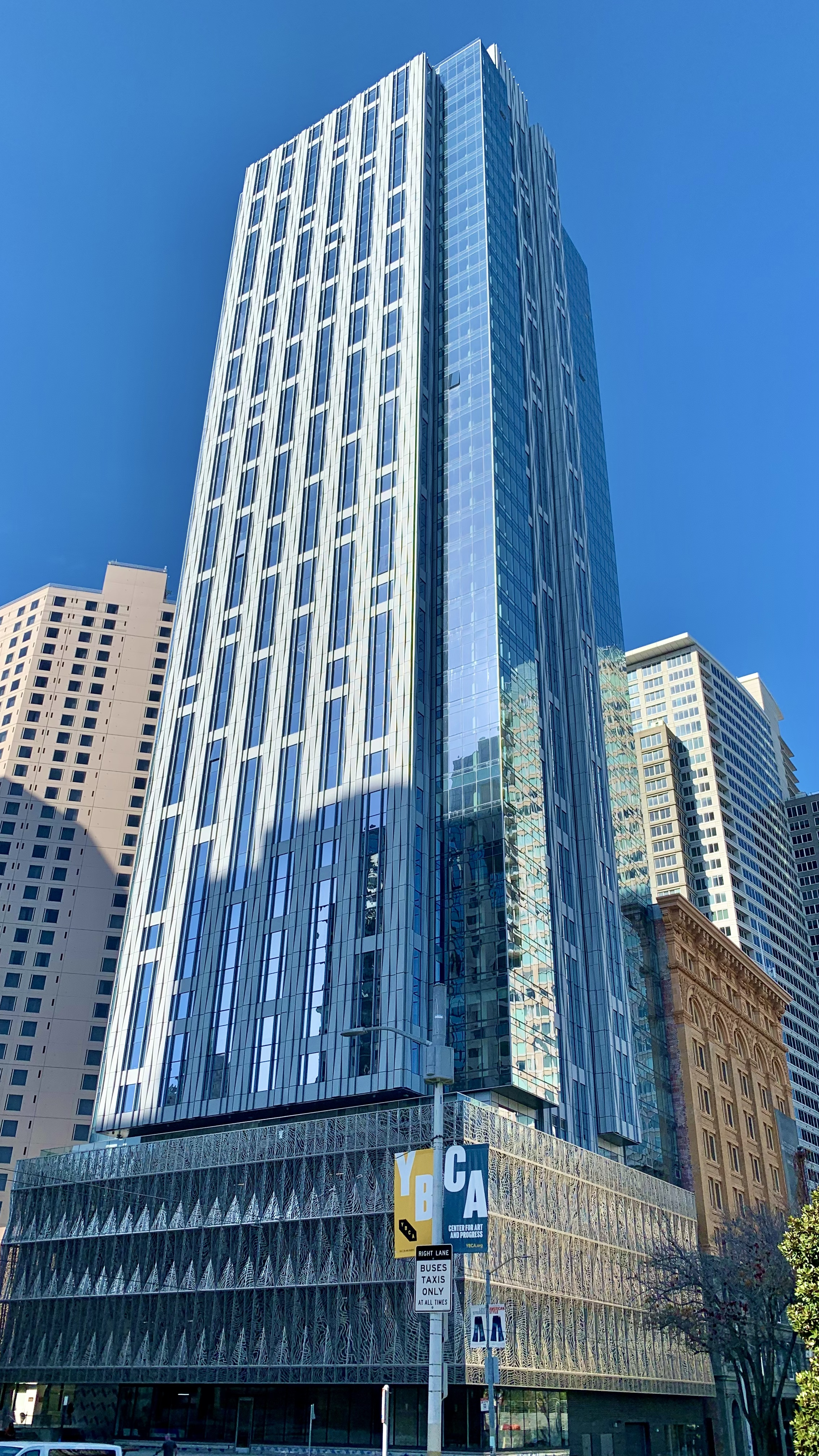
- In April 2021

- Location within San Francisco

General information
- Status: Completed
- Type: Museum, residential condos
- Classification: Skyscraper
- Location: 706 Mission Street, San Francisco, California
- Coordinates: 37.7860°N 122.4028°W
- Construction started: 2016
- Topped-out: November 2019
- Completed: 2021
- Cost: US$500 million

Height
- Architectural: 510 ft (160 m)
- Roof: 480 ft (150 m)

Technical details
- Floor count: 43

Design and construction
- Architects: Handel Architects; TEN Arquitectos
- Developer: Westbrook Partners
- Main contractor: Webcor Builders

Other information
- Number of units: 148

Four Seasons Private Residences at 706 Mission Street, San Francisco (formerly named 706 Mission Street) is a 43-story, 510 ft (160 m) residential skyscraper in the South of Market district of San Francisco, California.

Located across the street from Yerba Buena Gardens and Moscone Center, the tower site is bounded by Mission Street on the south and 3rd Street on the east, and incorporates the historic Aronson Building in its design. The tower contains 148 condominiums on the upper floors and a planned permanent home for the Mexican Museum on the bottom four floors.

== History ==
The project was approved by the San Francisco Planning Commission and Board of Supervisors in 2013, and construction started in February 2016.

Pre-sales for the 146 condos began in May 2019, ranging from $2.3 million per unit up to $49 million for the top-floor penthouse, making the latter the highest-priced penthouse in San Francisco. It has 12 penthouse units priced in the $15 million to $25 million range. The project was taken over by Westbrook Partners in the fall of 2019, creating the 706 Mission Co. LLC entity. In October 2019, the San Francisco Business Times reported that The Four Seasons Private Residences was hiring art and wine experts. In January 2020, it was reported that athlete Steph Curry was buying a unit in the tower. After the coronavirus pandemic impacted the physical sales process for several months, the residence began offering virtual real estate tours in May 2020. The building formally opened for occupancy in May 2021.

== Notable tenants ==
- Steph Curry - Golden State Warriors

== Legal ==
After approval in 2013, the development faced a lawsuit from residents of the nearby Four Seasons Hotel & Residences, which was settled in 2015.

== See also ==
- Four Seasons Hotel, San Francisco (757 Market Street)
- Four Seasons Hotel San Francisco at Embarcadero (222 Sansome Street)
- List of tallest buildings in San Francisco
