= APEC United States 2023 =

APEC meetings in San Francisco

APEC 2023 United States
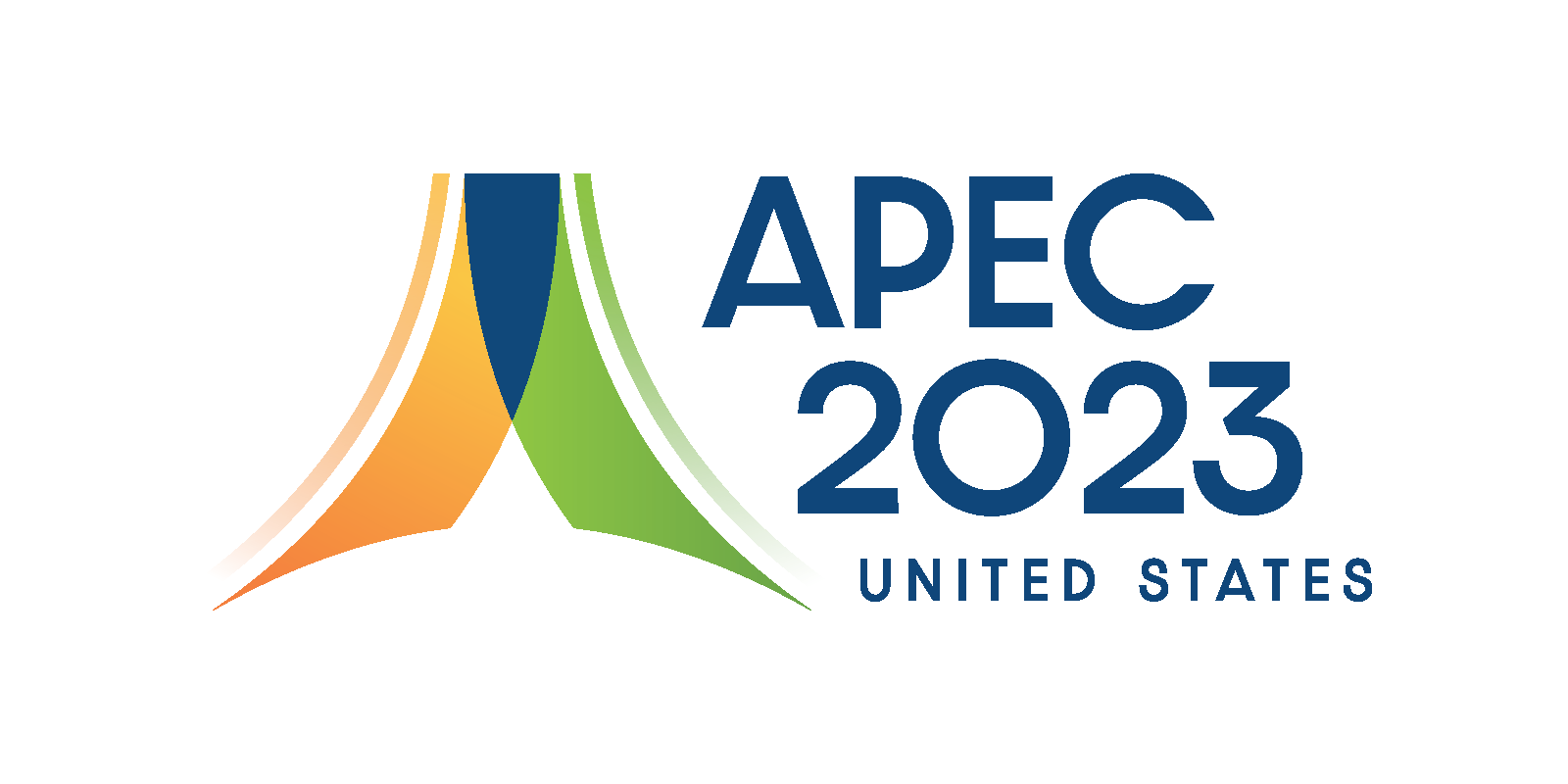

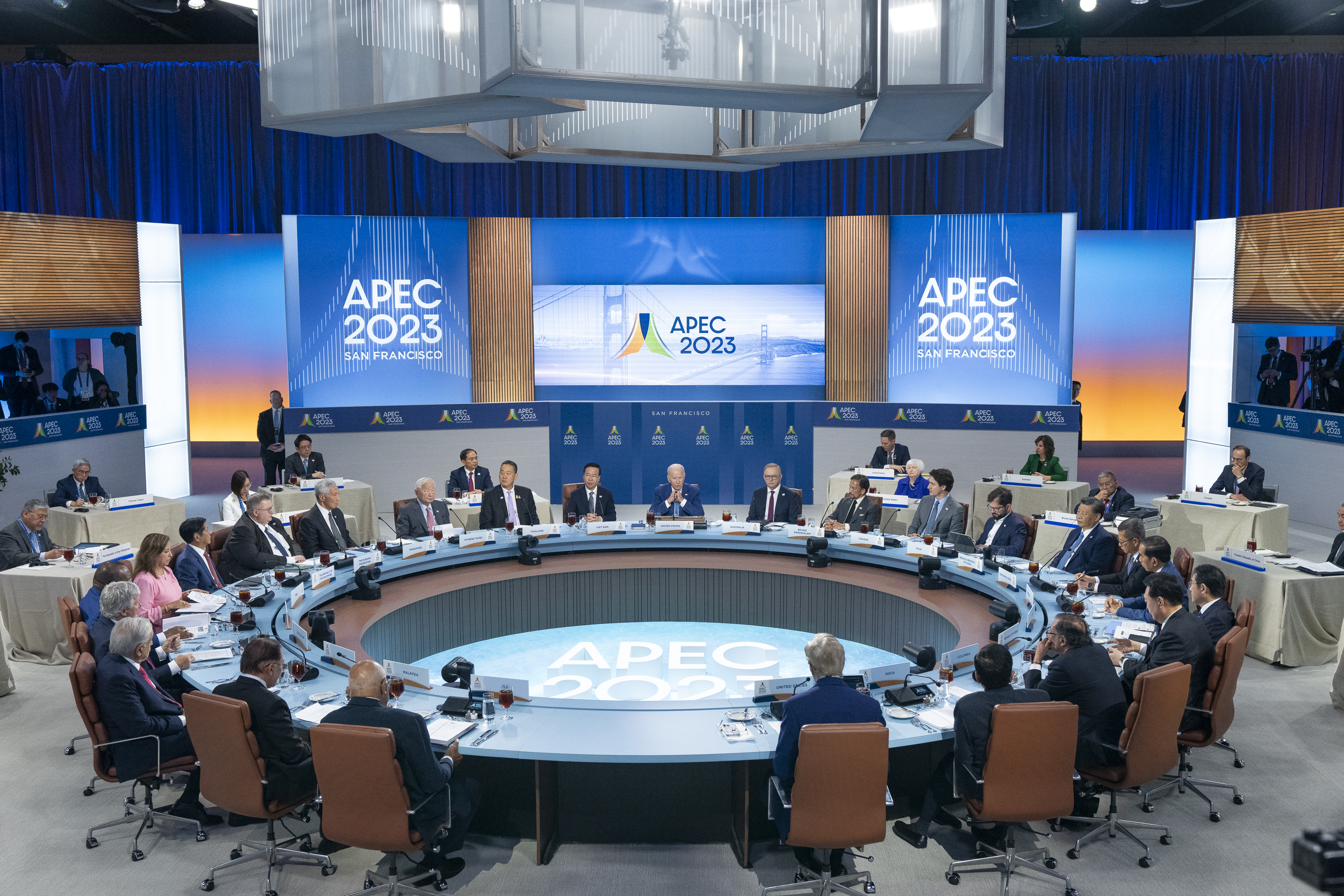
- Host country: United States
- Date: November 11–17, 2023 (Economic Leaders' Meeting)
- Venues: San Francisco
- Follows: APEC Thailand 2022
- Precedes: APEC Peru 2024
- Website: apec2023sf.org (archived)

APEC 2023 United States was the year-long hosting of Asia-Pacific Economic Cooperation (APEC) meetings in the United States taking place in 2023. It was held in San Francisco. APEC United States 2023 marked the third time the United States hosted an APEC meeting, having previously hosted in 1993 in Blake Island and 2011 in Honolulu.

== Preparations ==
In November 2023, San Francisco started clearing out all of the homeless people from certain parts of the city in preparation for the summit. On September 25, a high-ranking official from the city's Public Works department emailed to city officials listing seven intersections to target, writing that due to the upcoming summit, he was "concerned about historical encampments that are close to priority areas". The San Francisco Chronicle noted that "All seven intersections are in the two neighborhoods that have long been at the epicenter of San Francisco’s unrelenting crises of homelessness and public drug markets."

== Events ==
=== Participants ===
Due to the sanctions imposed on him by the U.S. government, Hong Kong chief executive John Lee Ka-chiu was not invited to the summit. In response, the Chinese foreign ministry reiterated its calls for the U.S. to lift sanctions on Lee, and "fulfil the due responsibility as APEC host, invite Chief Executive John Lee Ka-chiu to the meeting". Eventually, the Hong Kong government announced Lee would not attend due to "scheduling issues", with Financial Secretary Paul Chan Mo-po attending in his place. Mexican president Andrés Manuel López Obrador initially announced he would not attend the summit due to disagreements with Peruvian president Dina Boluarte. However, he later changed his decision, saying he would attend. Russian president Vladimir Putin, who has been issued an arrest warrant by the International Criminal Court following the Russo-Ukrainian war, did not attend the summit, with Deputy Prime Minister Alexey Overchuk attending in his place.

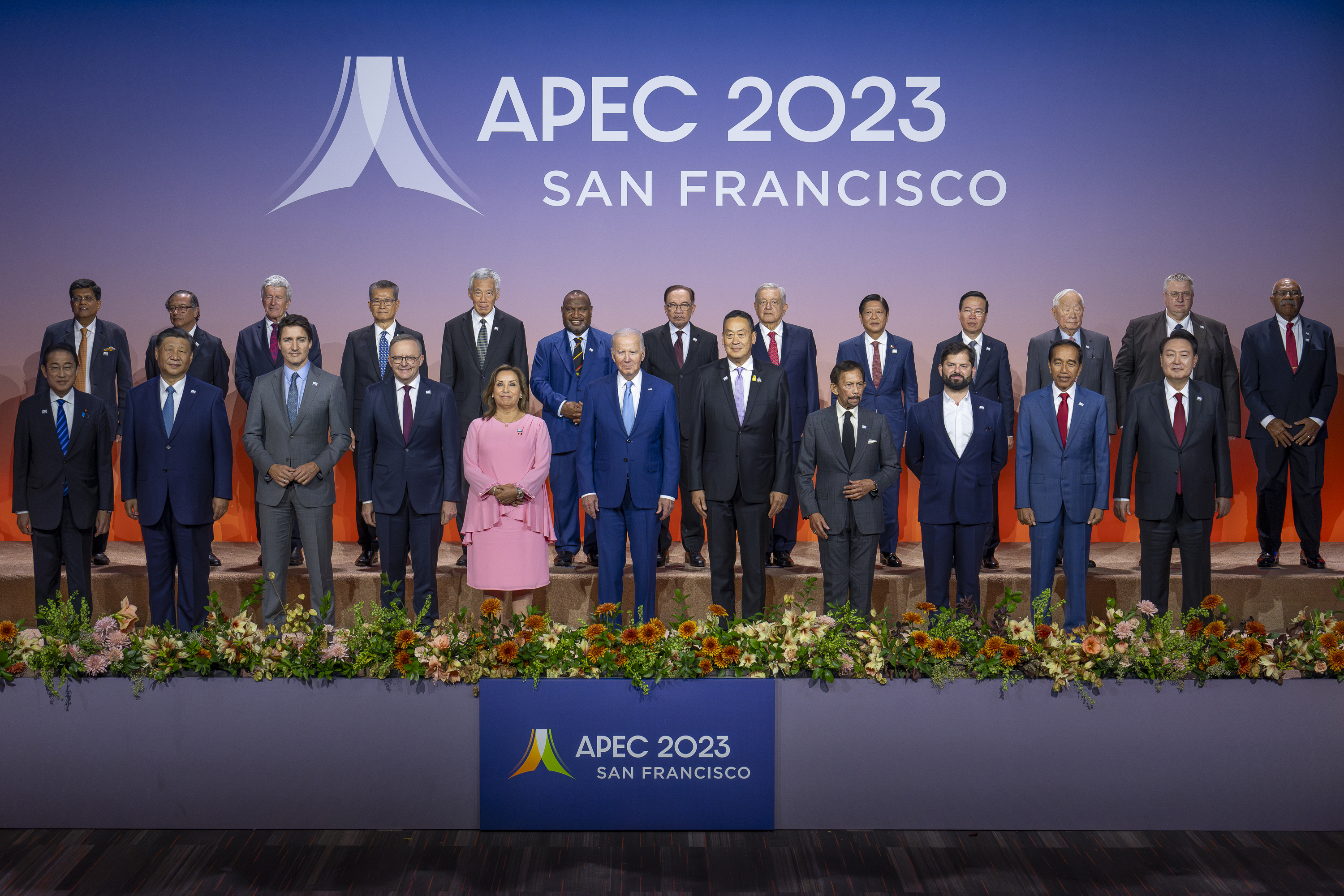
APEC family photo in San Francisco
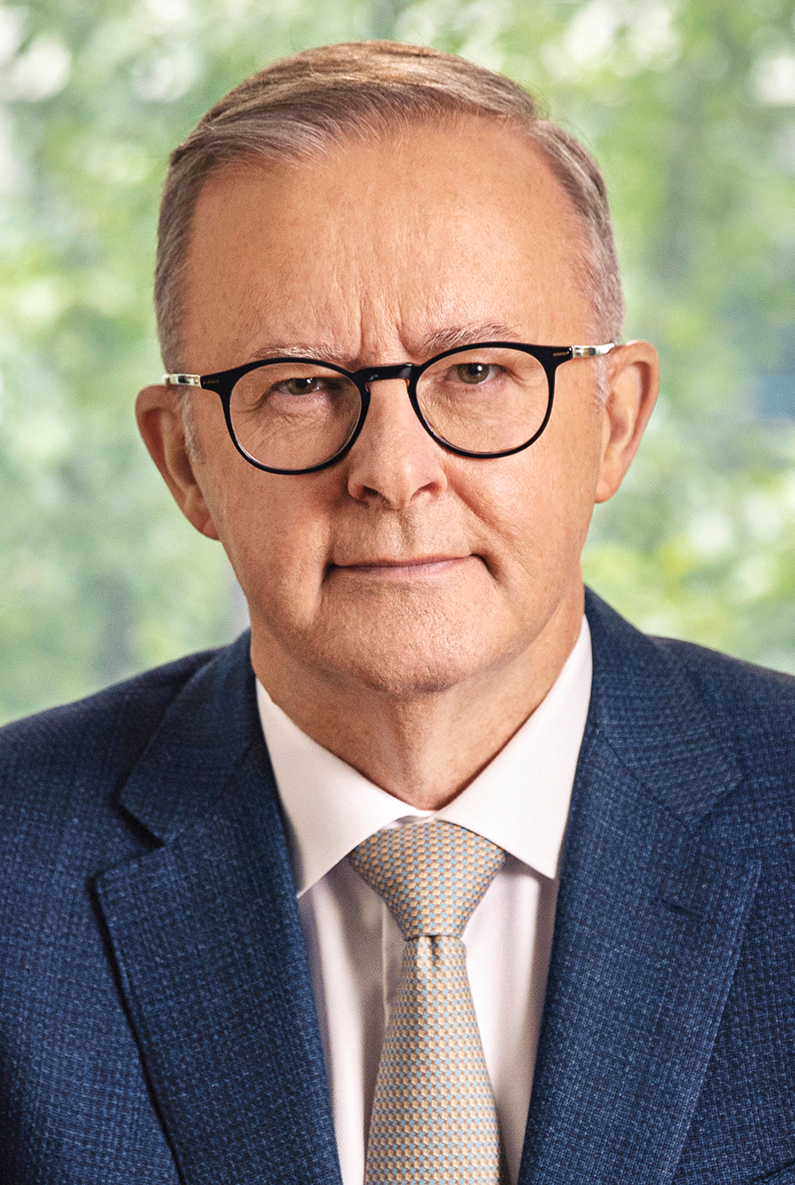
Australia
Anthony Albanese,
Prime Minister

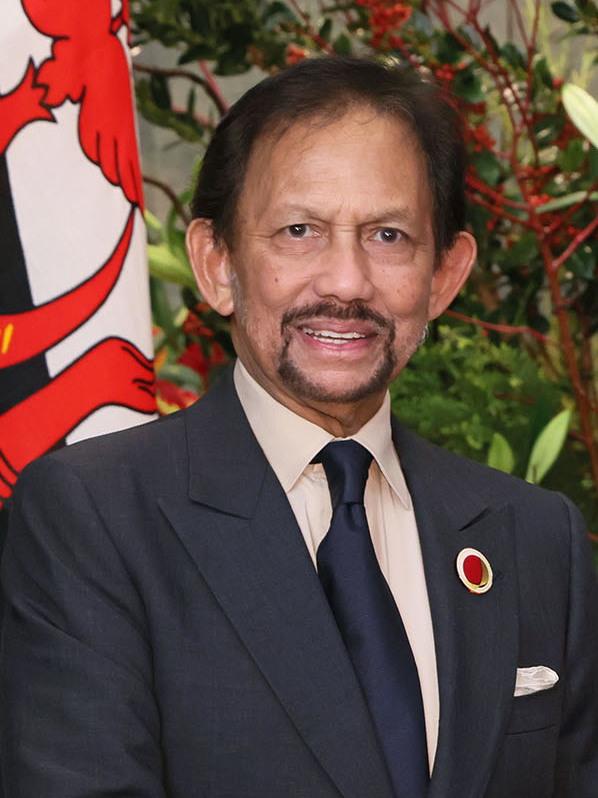
Brunei
Hassanal Bolkiah,
Sultan

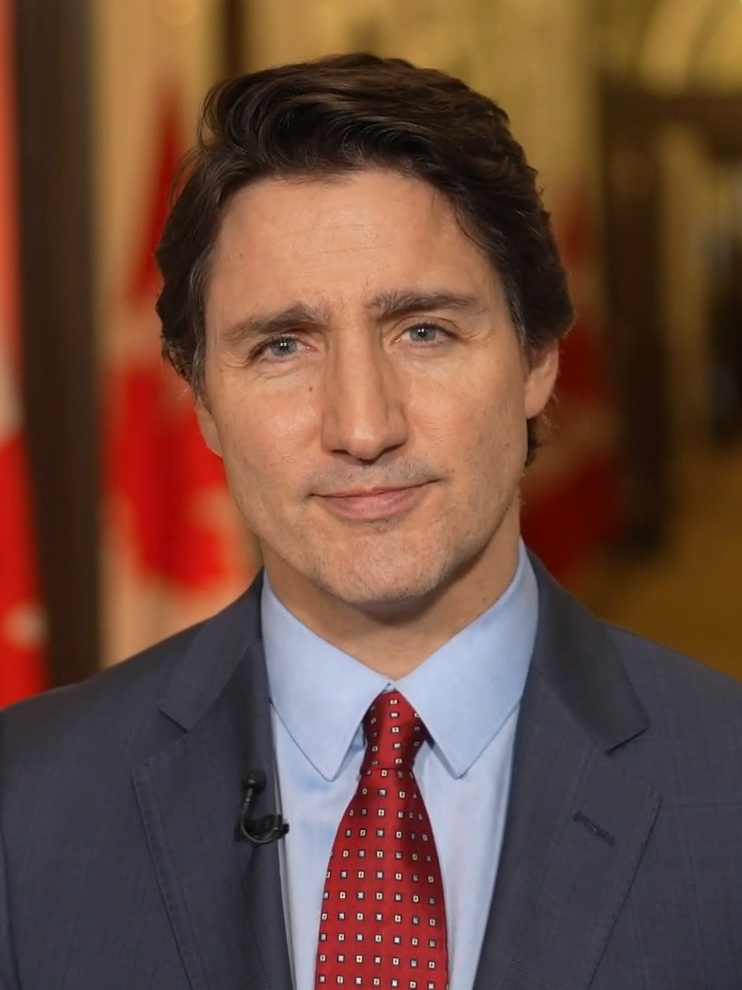
Canada
Justin Trudeau,
Prime Minister

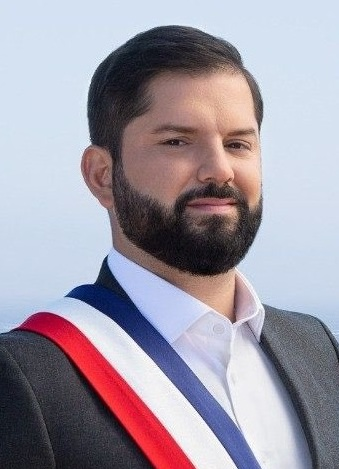
Chile
Gabriel Boric,
President

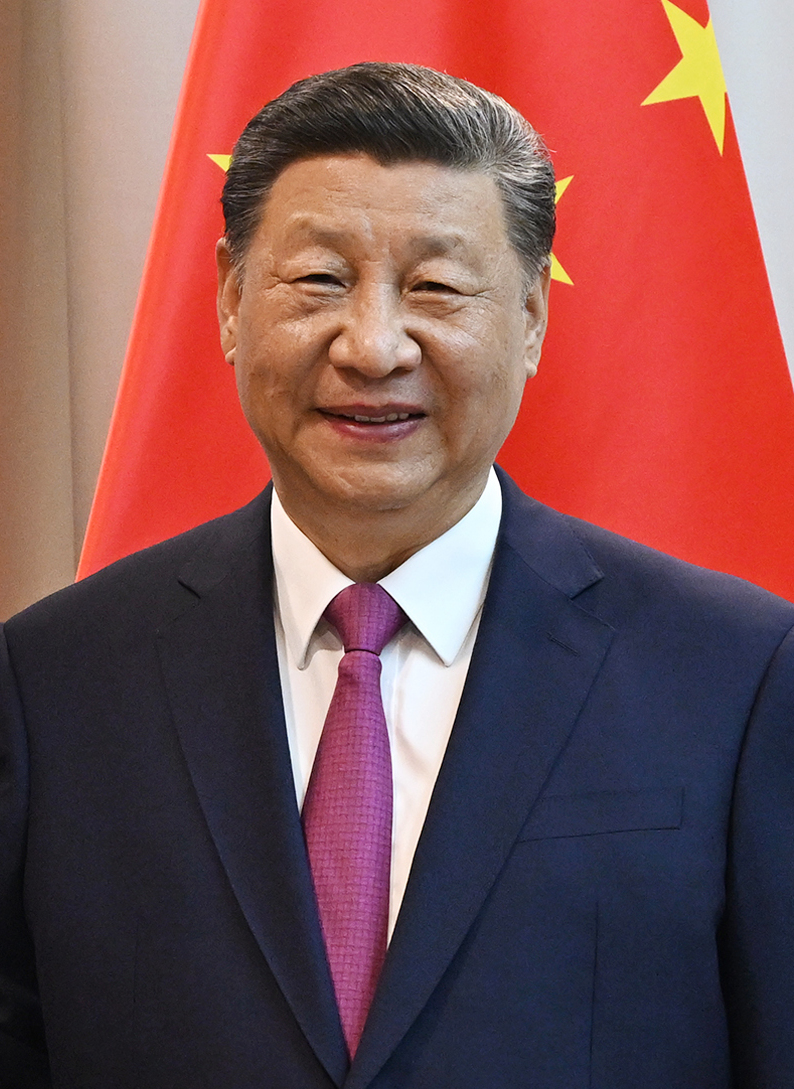
China
Xi Jinping,
President (Note: The president of China is legally a ceremonial office, but the general secretary of the Chinese Communist Party (de facto leader in one-party communist state) has always held this office since 1993 except for the months of transition, and the current general secretary is Xi Jinping, who is also the Chinese president.)

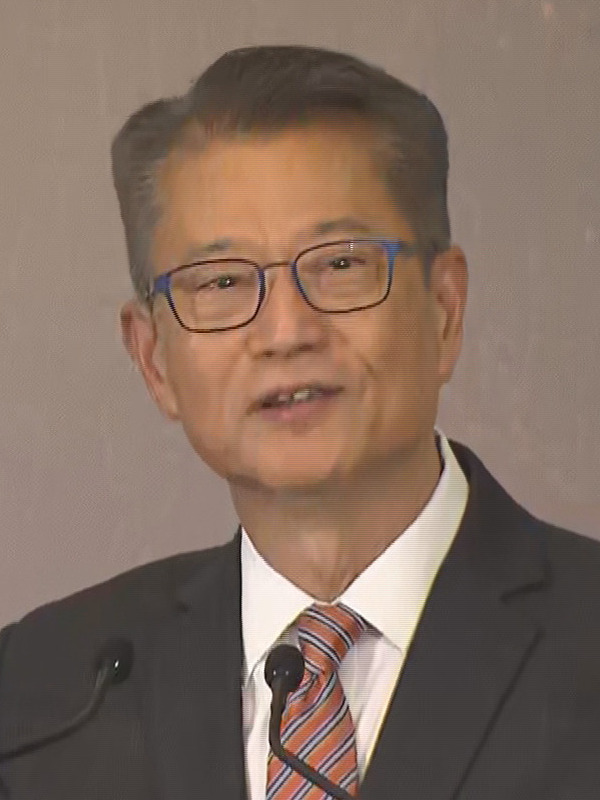
Hong Kong* (Note: (*) Hong Kong Chief Executive John Lee, Russian President Vladimir Putin and outgoing New Zealand Prime Minister Chris Hipkins did not attend the leaders' summit. Representatives of each country were sent to attend on their behalf.)
Paul Chan Mo-po,
Financial Secretary

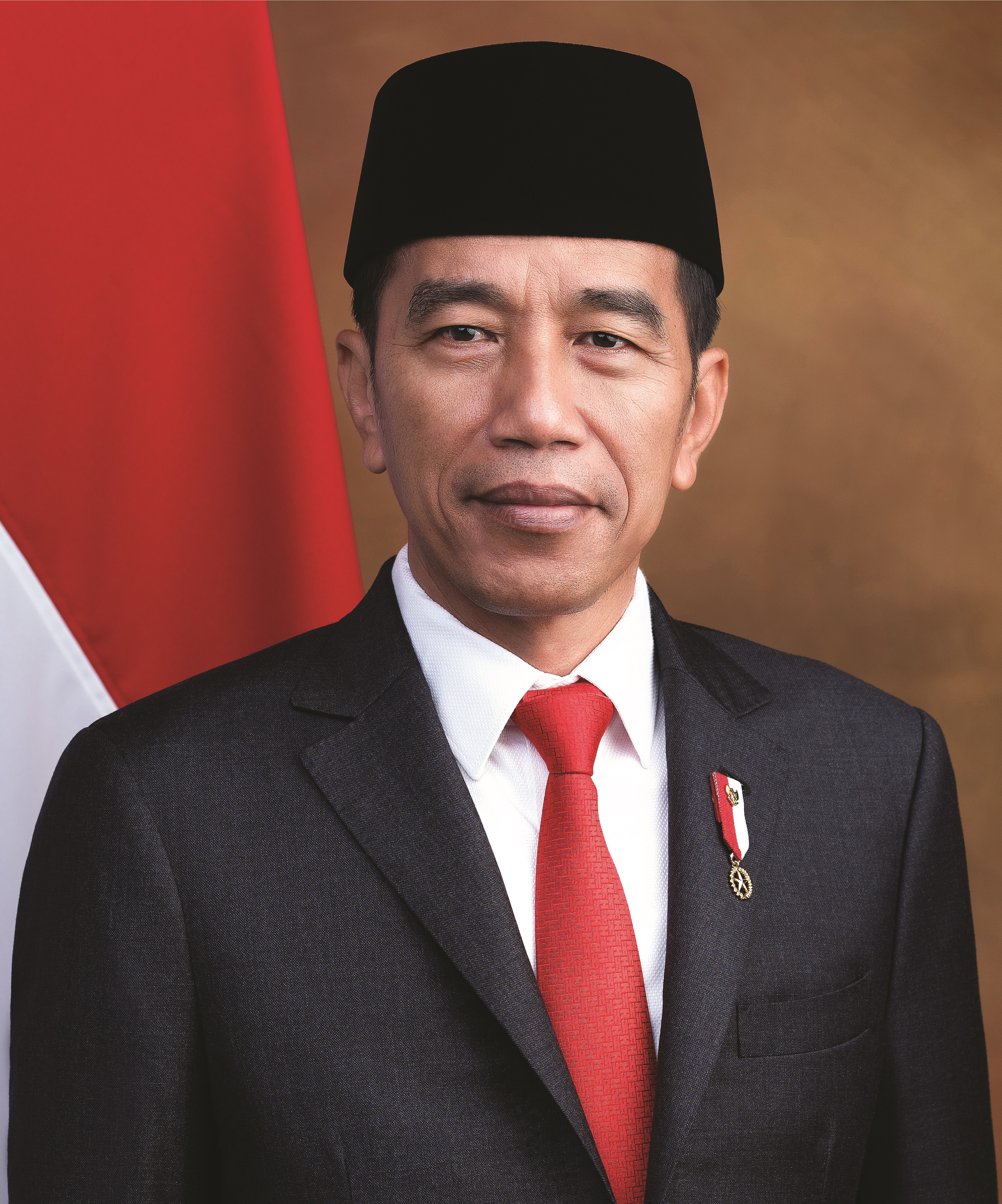
Indonesia
Joko Widodo,
President

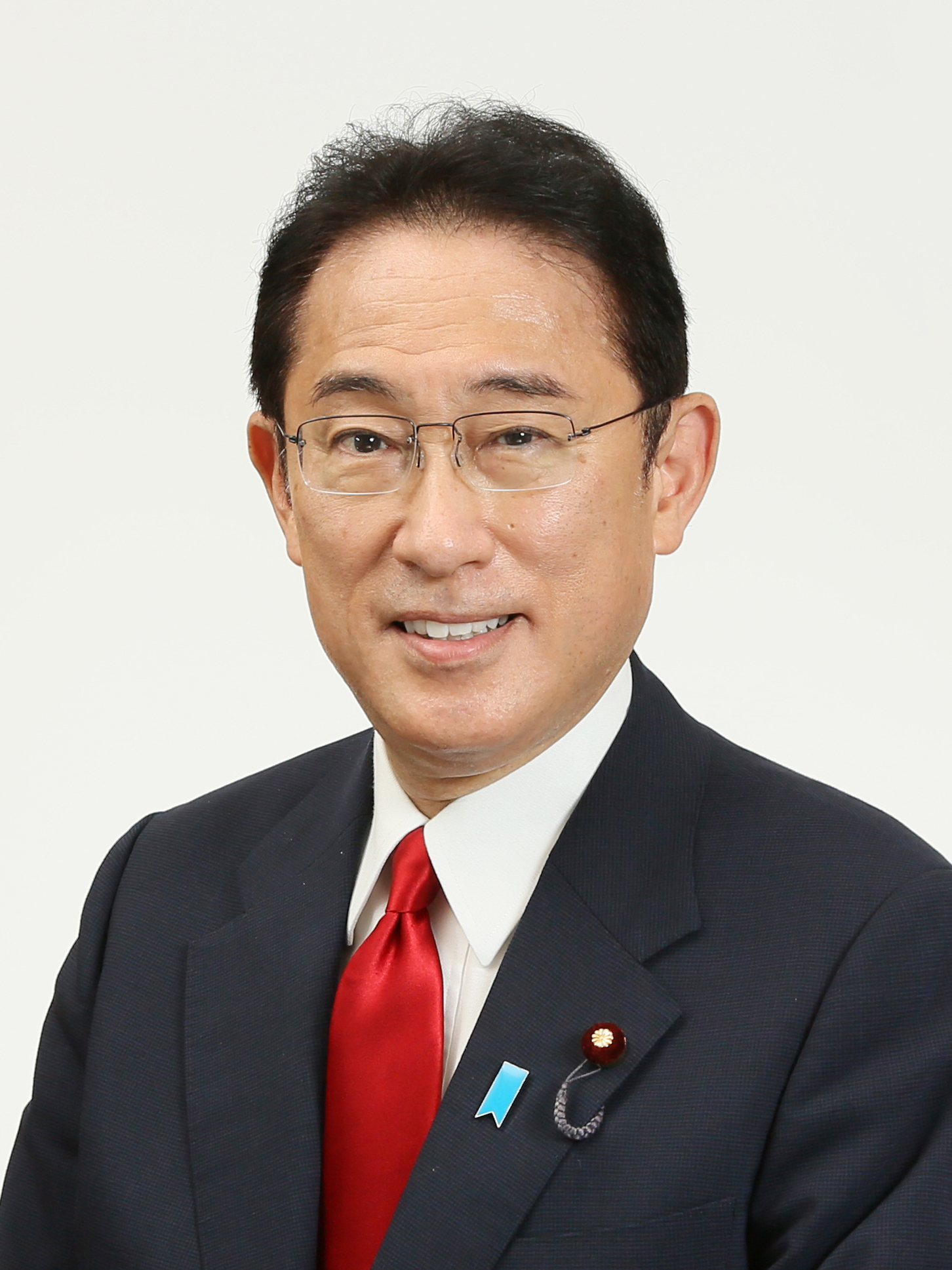
Japan
Fumio Kishida,
Prime Minister

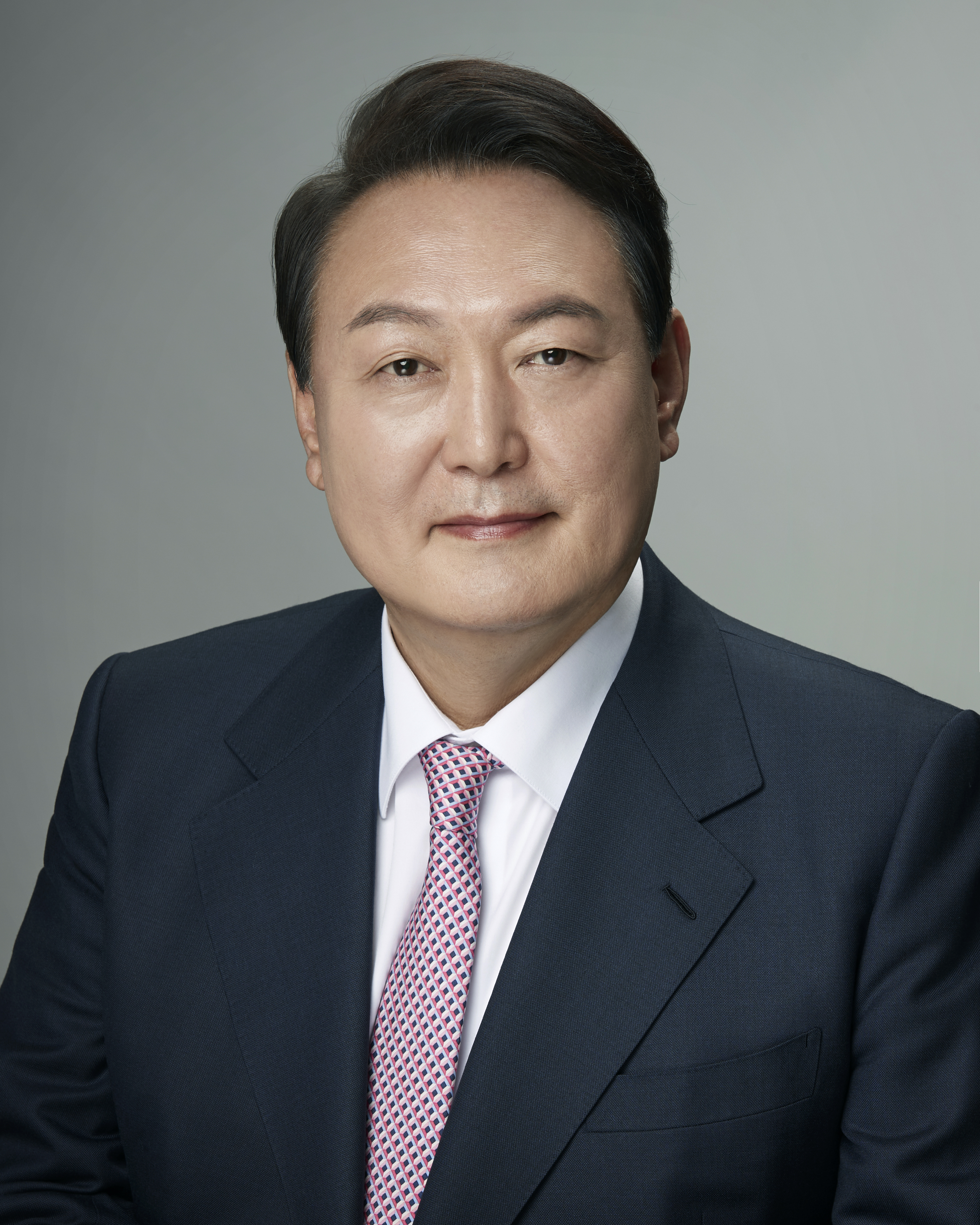
South Korea
Yoon Suk Yeol,
President

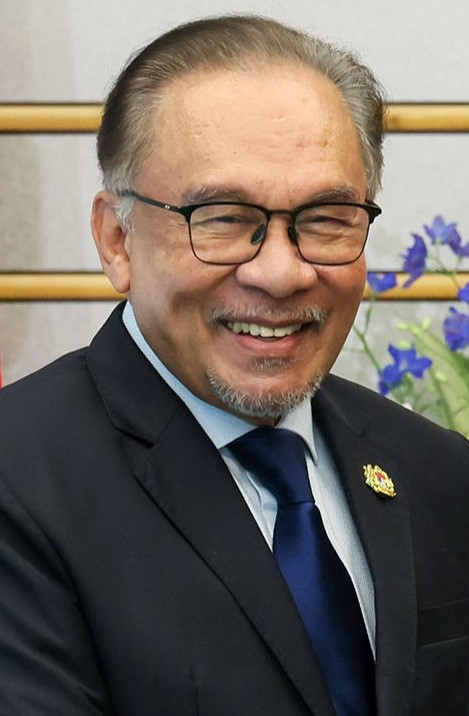
Malaysia
Anwar Ibrahim,
Prime Minister

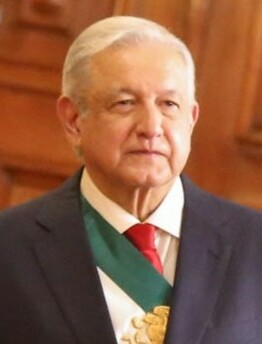
Mexico
Andrés Manuel López Obrador,
President

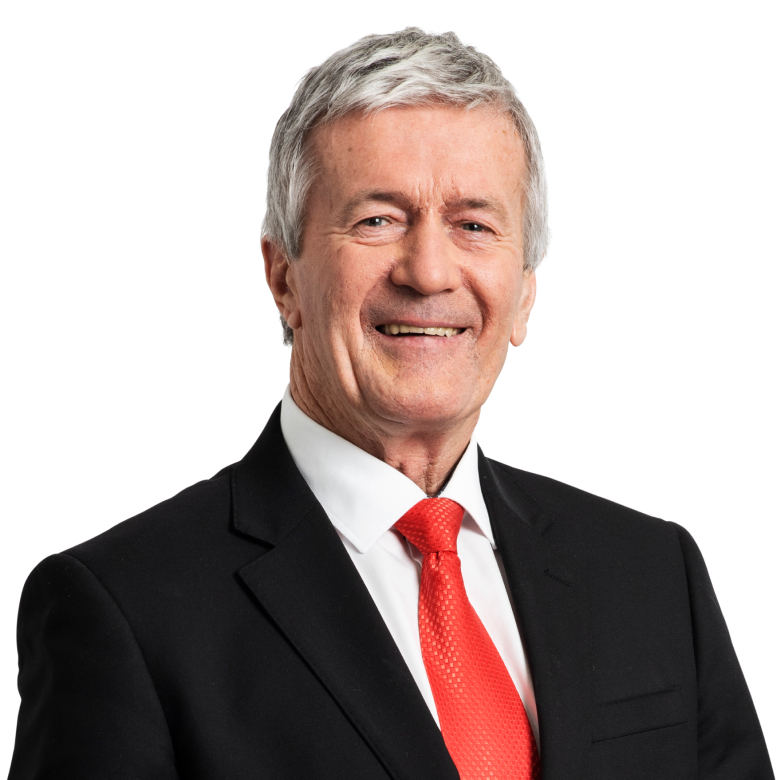
New Zealand*
Damien O'Connor,
Trade Minister

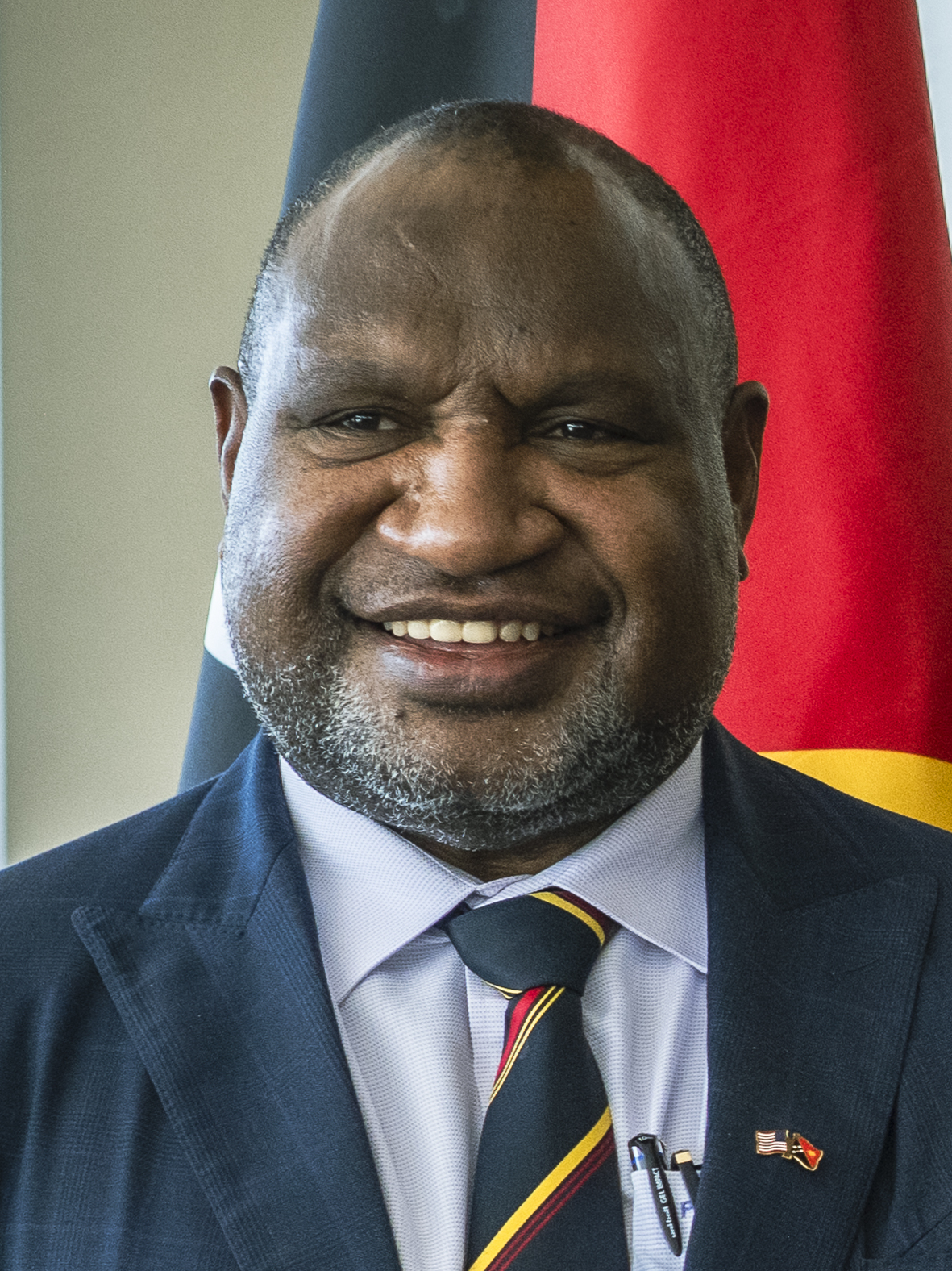
Papua New Guinea
James Marape,
Prime Minister

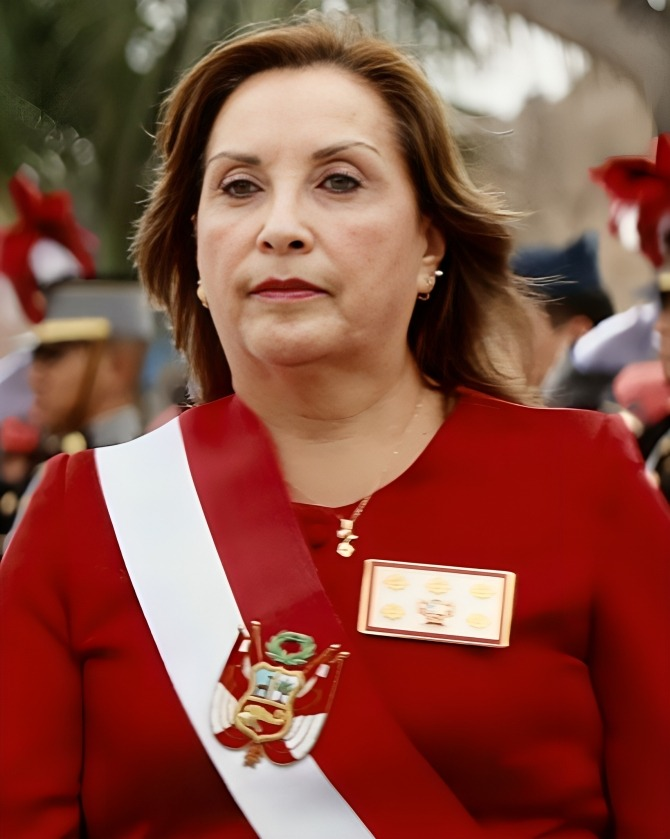
Peru
Dina Boluarte,
President

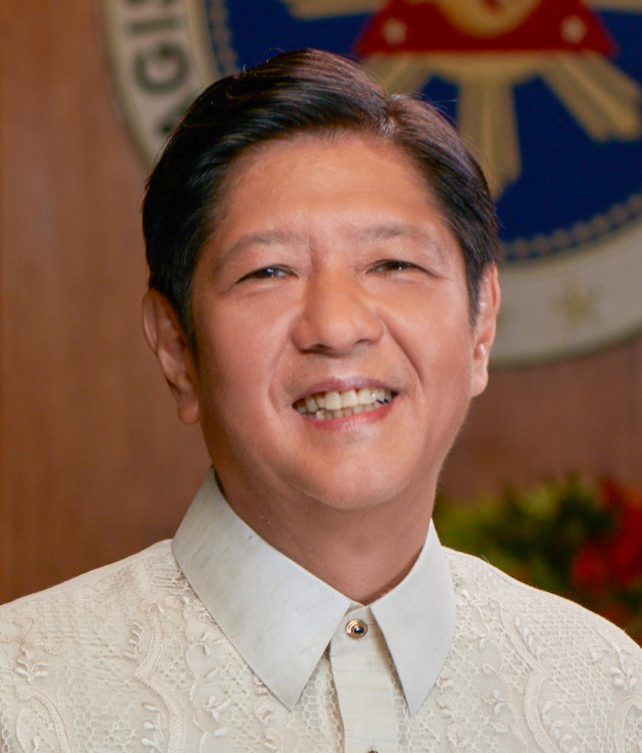
Philippines
Bongbong Marcos,
President

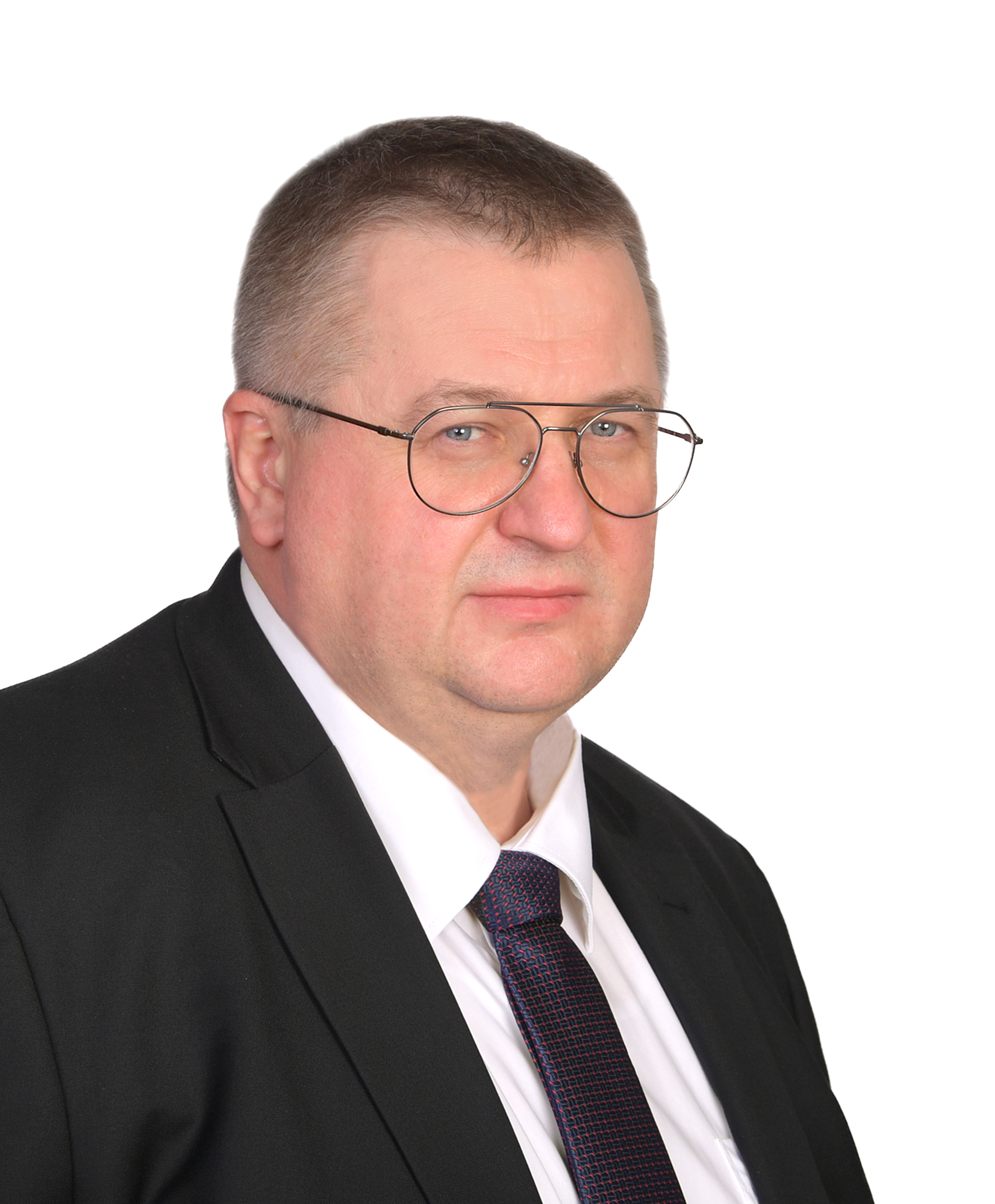
Russia*
Alexey Overchuk,
Deputy Prime Minister

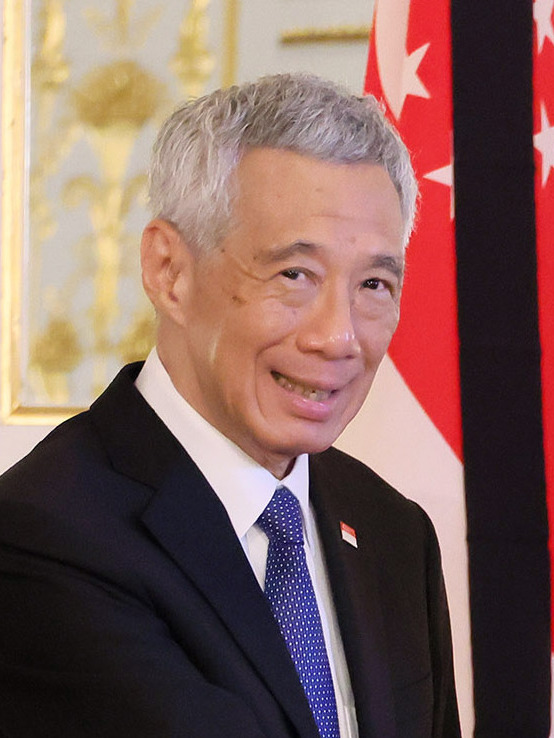
Singapore
Lee Hsien Loong,
Prime Minister

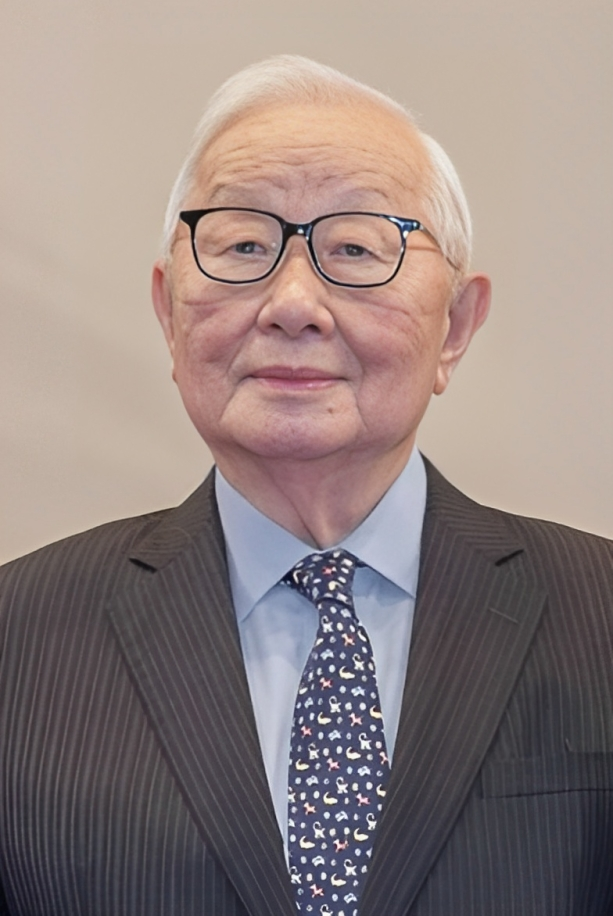
Taiwan
Morris Chang, Special Representative of Leader (Note: Due to the complexities of the relations between it and the People's Republic of China, the Republic of China (ROC or "Taiwan") was not represented under its official name "Republic of China" or as "Taiwan". Instead, it participates in APEC under the name "Chinese Taipei". The President of the Republic of China does not attend the annual APEC Economic Leaders' Meeting in person. Instead, it was generally represented by a ministerial-level official responsible for economic affairs or someone designated by the president. See List of Chinese Taipei Representatives to APEC.) (representing President Tsai Ing-wen)

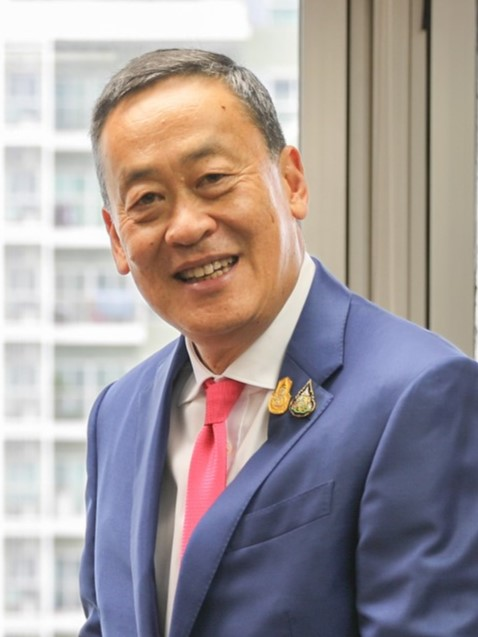
Thailand
Srettha Thavisin,
Prime Minister

United States
Joe Biden,
President (Host)

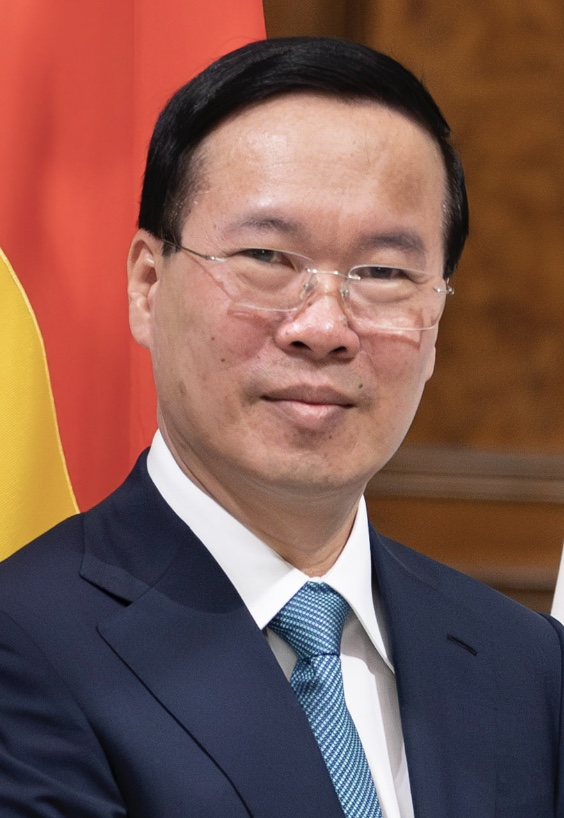
Vietnam
Võ Văn Thưởng,
President (Note: The actual head of government of Vietnam is the Prime Minister. The President of Vietnam is legally the head of state, but the General Secretary of the Communist Party of Vietnam is the practical highest political leader in one-party communist state.)

=== Invited guests ===
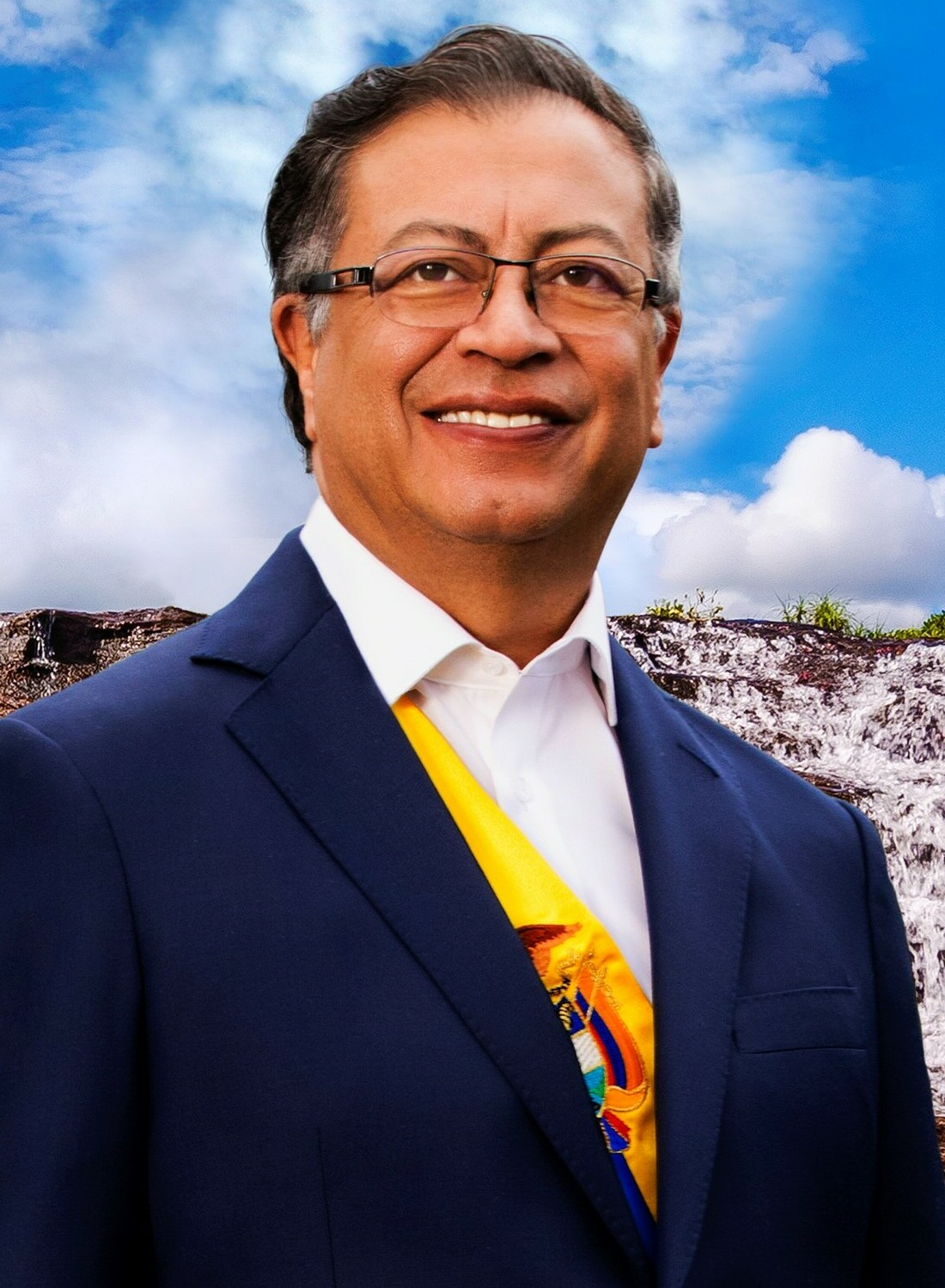
Colombia
Gustavo Petro (Note: The leaders of Colombia and Fiji, as well as a representative for India, attended the meeting as the invited guests of host Joe Biden.), President

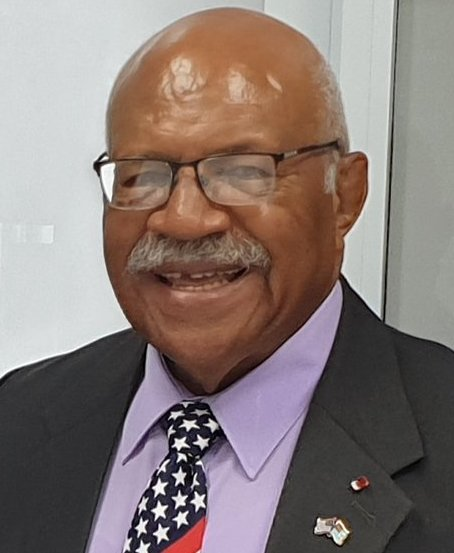
Fiji
Sitiveni Rabuka, Prime Minister

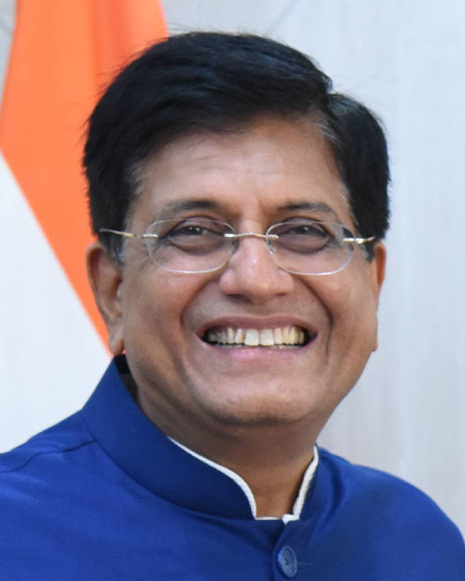
India
Piyush Goyal, Commerce and Industry Minister

== Sidelines ==
=== Biden–Xi summit ===
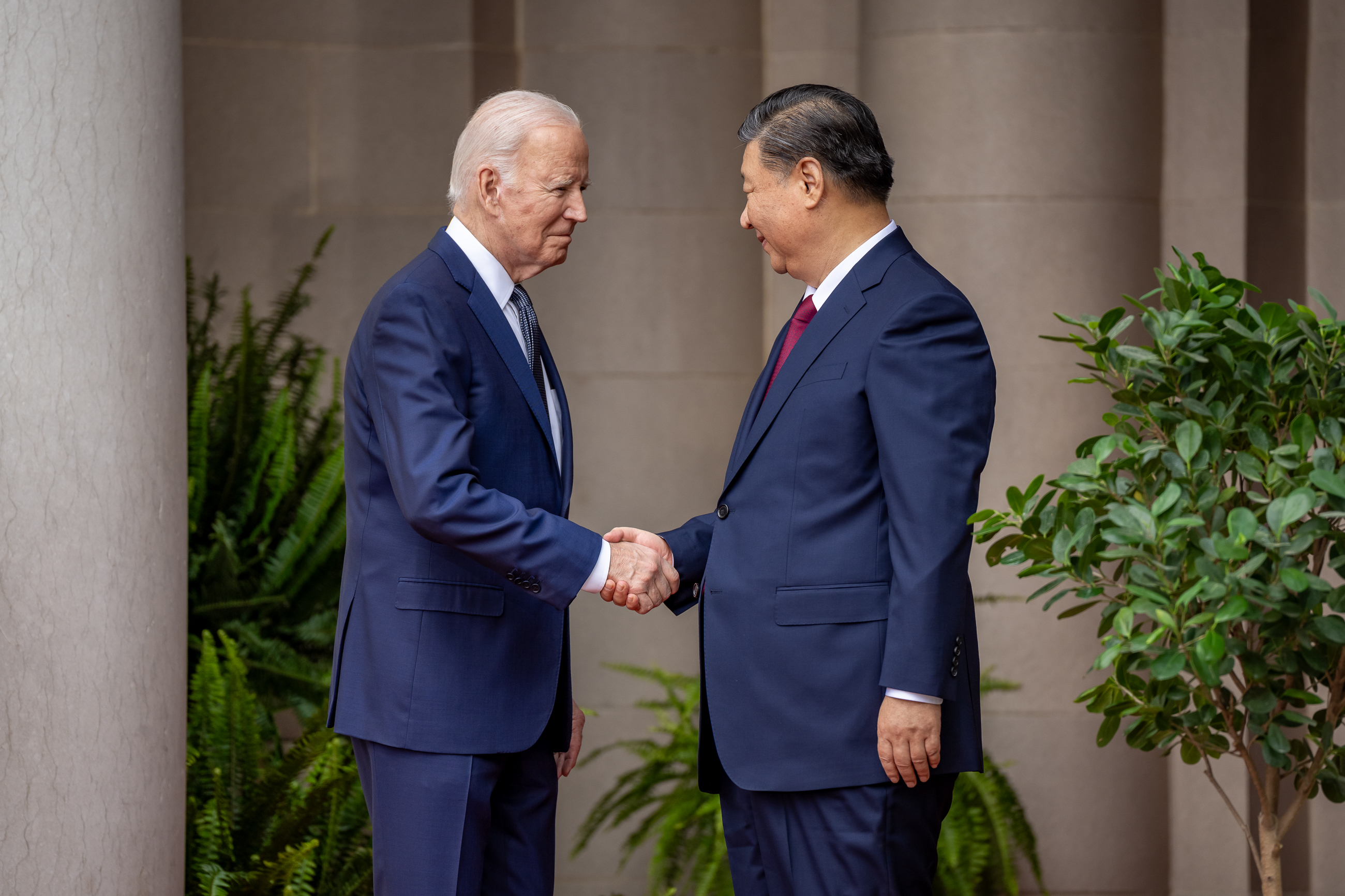
US President Joe Biden and CCP General Secretary Xi Jinping meeting

International coverage related to APEC 2023 focused on the summit between US President Joe Biden and Chinese leader Xi Jinping on 15 November, held separately from the APEC summit at the Filoli estate in Unincorporated San Mateo County near the town of Woodside, California. APEC United States 2023 was the second APEC meeting for Xi Jinping in his third term, who was re-elected as the CCP General Secretary on 23 October 2022. Xi and Biden previously met virtually at the meeting hosted by New Zealand in 2021 – the first APEC summit of the Biden presidency – but Vice President Kamala Harris went in Biden's place to Thailand in 2022. (Xi hosted the 2014 APEC summit with U.S. President Barack Obama attending in Beijing. Obama and he had first met when Xi as Vice President, officially hosted by then-VP Biden, visited Washington in 2012.) A substantial portion of the issues facing the two leaders also involve APEC members and the deep histories of all nations in the APEC region. Anticipation in the U.S. for the 2023 meeting by the two leaders preceded the event in San Francisco.

=== Protests and incidents ===
In November 2023, demonstrations spanning a variety of issues, particularly objecting to Xi Jinping's presence in the United States, took place near San Francisco International Airport and meeting site prior to Xi Jinping's arrival at the APEC summit. Hundreds were bused in from across the U.S. by overseas Chinese hometown associations, with funding and coordination from the Consulate-General of China, Los Angeles, to welcome Xi. Multiple clashes were reported involving pro-Chinese government groups against Uyghur, Tibetan, Hongkonger, and Chinese dissident groups. The nonprofit group Human Rights in China stated that evidence of assaults and selective police enforcement would be submitted to the United States House Select Committee on Strategic Competition between the United States and the Chinese Communist Party. An investigation by The Washington Post found that "the most extreme violence was instigated by pro-CCP activists" and involved coordination by Chinese consular officials.

Taiwanese reporters were harassed and stopped from filming near the St. Regis Museum Tower.

The Congressional-Executive Commission on China subsequently condemned the attacks on protesters and urged further law enforcement investigation. In August 2024, John Moolenaar, chair of the United States House Select Committee on Strategic Competition between the United States and the Chinese Communist Party, called on the Federal Bureau of Investigation and San Francisco Police Department to "hold the perpetrators accountable."

== Notes ==
Preceded by APEC Thailand 2022	APEC meetings 2023	Succeeded by APEC Peru 2024
