= Webcor Builders =

American commercial construction contractor

Webcor
- Type: Subsidiary
- Genre: Commercial building contractor
- Founded: 1971
- Founder: Bill Wilson; Rosser B. Edwards; David R. Boyd; Miller Ream
- Headquarters: 207 King Street, Suite 300; San Francisco, California 94107
- Key people: Matt Rossie, President/CEO; Matt Reece, Sr. EVP/CFO/CAO
- Number of employees: 850 (2024)
- Parent: Obayashi
- Website: www.webcor.com

Webcor is an American commercial construction contractor with headquarters in San Francisco, California. The firm also has regional offices in Alameda, Los Angeles, San Diego, and San Jose, and is among the largest builders in California with clients including Google, Apple Inc., Samsung, Genentech, Brookfield Properties, University of California, Oracle Corporation, the California Academy of Sciences, eBay and Electronic Arts. It has been part of Obayashi since 2007.

== History ==
1971: Webcor was founded by Bill Wilson, Ross Edwards, Dave Boyd, and Miller Ream (the CO comes from "company") in San Mateo, California. For the entirety of their tenure, Ross Edwards and Dave Boyd would take turns being President and CEO.

1972: Webcor built its first project POP1 in San Mateo.

1985: Rich Lamb (who would eventually go on to become the COO before retiring at the end of 2014) was hired to lead self-performed interior construction. His work would eventually solidify Webcor's reputation as a self-performing general contractor.

1987: Webcor built its first high-rise project with condominium project Museum Parc in San Francisco.

1991: Webcor entered public works with a new theater at Watsonville High School and the parking garage at the Hayward BART station.

1994: The founders merged with AJ Ball in to solidify financial strength and diversify their resume for future higher-profile project pursuits.

1996: Oracle World HQ in Redwood City, California - the company's first project with a high-profile, visible client.

1999: Webcor Concrete was formed as a separate division that could take on work as a concrete subcontractor. Webcor Concrete’s first project, Seaport Plaza in Redwood City, was completed in December 2000.

2000: Andy Ball became CEO after the founders retired, and began to expand the business beyond the Bay Area. Webcor opened offices in Los Angeles and San Diego.

2002:The Lucas Digital Arts campus for Star Wars filmmaker George Lucas was, at the time, the largest and most complex project Webcor ever undertook, located in the Presidio of San Francisco.

2005: The California Academy of Sciences in San Francisco was built, becoming the first LEED Double-Platinum museum in the world, as well as the largest Double-Platinum building.

2007: Webcor was acquired by the Japanese construction giant Obayashi for even more financial stability and opportunities to pursue larger and more complex work.

2010: Webcor-Obayashi JV broke ground on the Transbay Transit Center. Once completed, the Center will revolutionize public transit in the Bay Area. The City of San Francisco also hopes that the Center will eventually be a stop on the proposed California high-speed rail system.

2012: Jes Pedersen was promoted to CEO with a plan to diversify and expand Webcor's portfolio and continue growth into new markets, broader product types, and a wider range of clients.

2013: Webcor became the only California-based General Contractor to have its quality management systems certified against the ISO 9001 quality standards.

== Notable projects ==
Webcor has built or is building many notable projects throughout California and has been featured on the Discovery Channel's Extreme Engineering series for the California Academy of Sciences replacement project in Golden Gate Park. The firm's portfolio includes:

- SFMOMA Expansion, San Francisco
- California Academy of Sciences, San Francisco
- Cathedral of Christ the Light, Downtown Oakland
- Moscone Center Expansion, San Francisco
- Salesforce Transit Center, San Francisco
- The Century, Century City
- Millennium Tower (San Francisco), San Francisco
- The Infinity, San Francisco
- Foundry Square, San Francisco
- Hollywood Park Retail Development, Los Angeles
- Columbia Square Living, Hollywood
- Metropolis, Los Angeles
- 960 W 7th Street, Los Angeles (scheduled completion 2022)
- The W Hotel & Residences, Hollywood
- The Hotel & Residences at L.A. Live, Los Angeles
- InterContinental Hotel San Francisco
- W Hotel San Francisco
- St. Regis Museum Tower, San Francisco
- San Francisco General Hospital Rebuild Program, San Francisco
- Guam Naval Hospital Replacement Project, Guam
- UCSF Wayne and Gladys Valley Center for Vision on Block 33, San Francisco
- California Memorial Stadium seismic and program improvement project, Berkeley
- University of California, Merced Expansion, Merced
- Letterman Digital Arts Center, Presidio of San Francisco
- Symantec campus, Culver City, California
- IMax Corporation Headquarters, Playa Vista
