= 345 California Center =

48-story office tower in the financial district of San Francisco

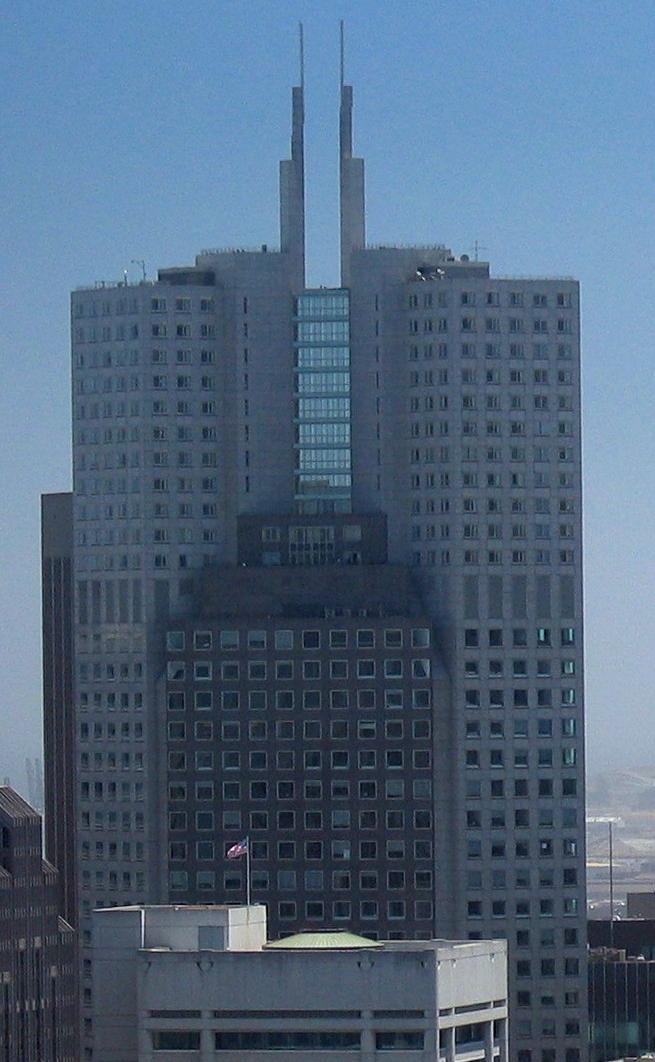

- Location within San Francisco 345 California Center (California) 345 California Center (the United States)
- Alternative names: California Center; Hotel; Stun Gun Towers; Tweezer Towers

General information
- Type: Commercial offices Hotel
- Location: 345 California Street; San Francisco, California
- Coordinates: 37.7925°N 122.4005°W
- Completed: 1986
- Cost: US$83 million
- Owner: Metropolis Investment Holdings Inc.
- Management: Cushman & Wakefield

Height
- Architectural: 695 ft (212 m)
- Tip: 721 ft (220 m)
- Roof: 620 ft (190 m)

Technical details
- Floor count: 48
- Floor area: 570,900 sq ft (53,040 m^{2})
- Lifts/elevators: 12

Design and construction
- Architect: Skidmore, Owings & Merrill
- Structural engineer: Skidmore, Owings & Merrill
- Main contractor: Hathaway Dinwiddie

345 California Center is a 48-story office tower in the financial district of San Francisco, California. Completed in 1986, the 211.8 m (695 ft) tower is the fifth tallest in the city after the Salesforce Tower, Transamerica Pyramid, 181 Fremont, and 555 California Street if the spires are included. It was originally proposed to be 30 m (98 ft) taller. The building was developed by Norland Properties, a private real estate investment firm led by Hany Ben-Halim.

345 California is in the middle of a block with historic buildings on each of the four corners. Initially planned as condominiums, the top 11 floors of the building are the Four Seasons Hotel San Francisco at Embarcadero, located in twin towers set at 45-degree angles to the rest of the building. Several glass skybridges offer views of the San Francisco Bay Area. The hotel has the street address 222 Sansome, with a different entrance.

== Floors ==
The floors of the building are used as follows:

- 38F - 48F: The Four Seasons Hotel San Francisco at Embarcadero
- 4F - 36F: offices
- 2F - 3F: retail and restaurants
- 1F: Lobby entrance to the offices and hotel
- B2F-B1F: parking garage

== Gallery ==
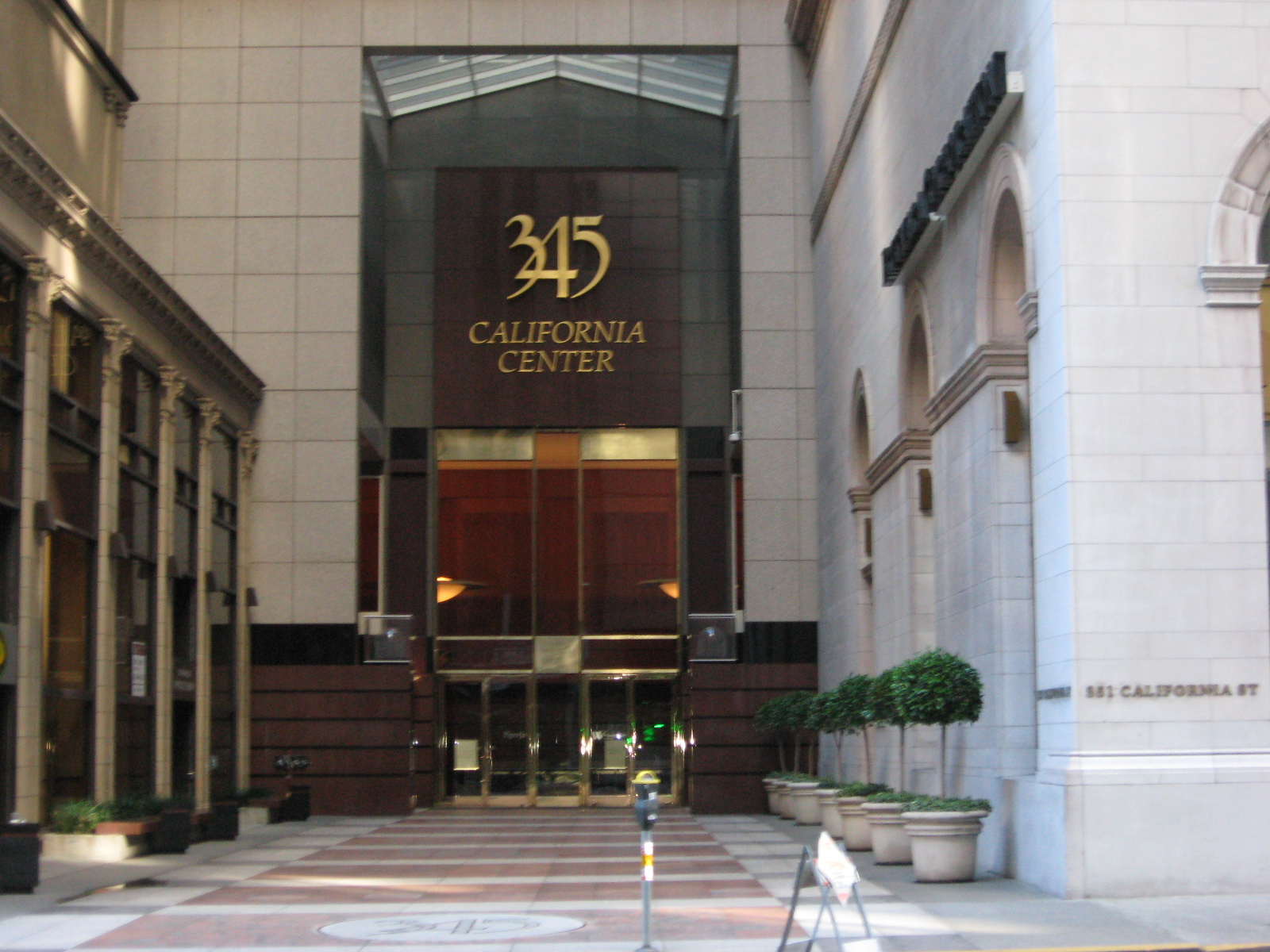
345 California lobby

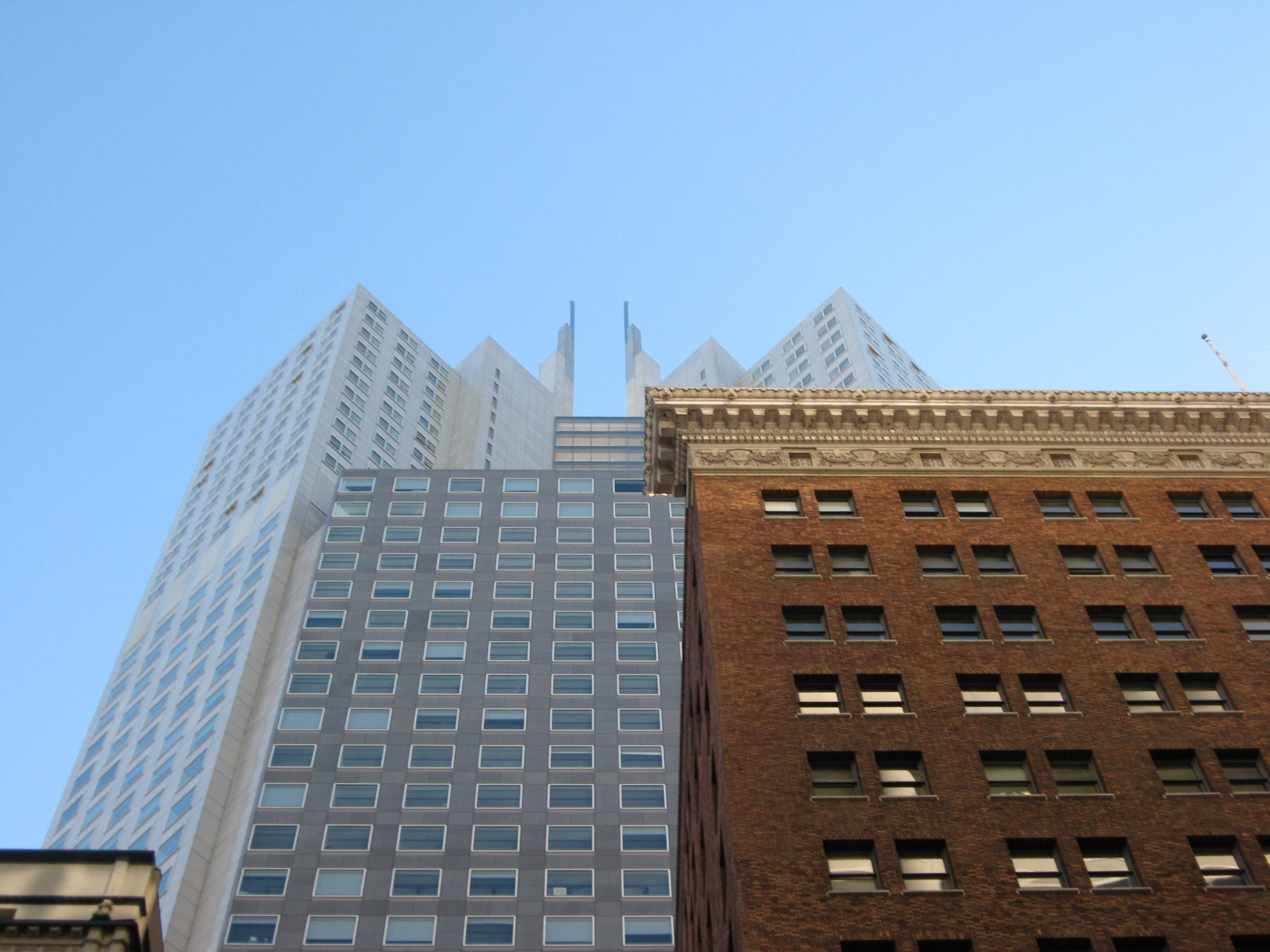
The building's twin spires

== See also ==
- List of tallest buildings in San Francisco
