= Four Seasons Hotel San Francisco at Embarcadero =

Hotel in San Francisco, California

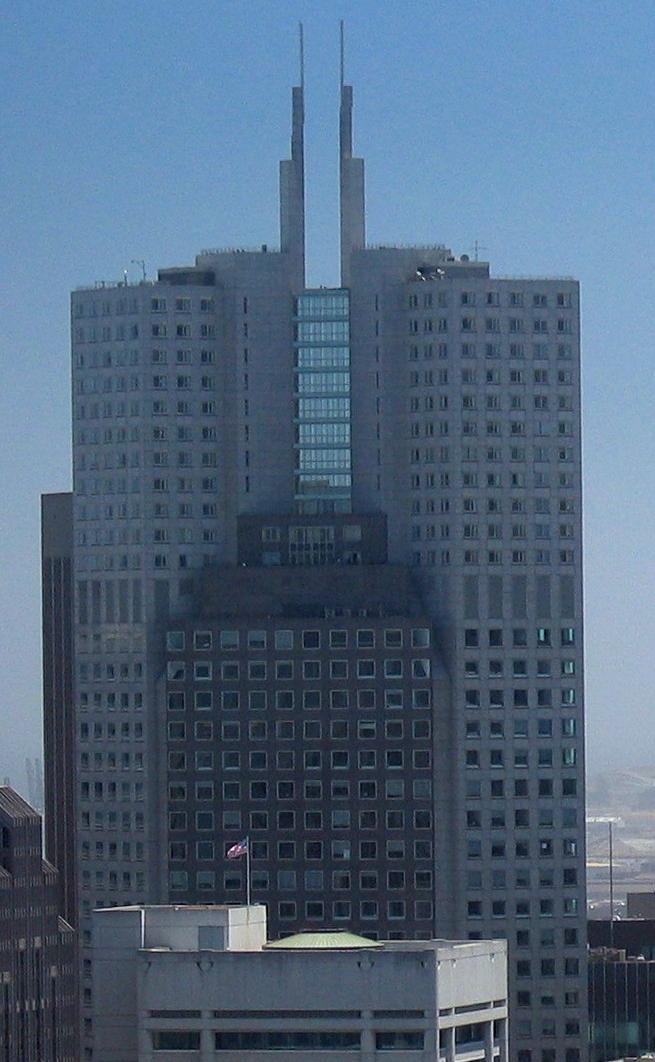

- Location within San Francisco Four Seasons Hotel San Francisco at Embarcadero (California) Four Seasons Hotel San Francisco at Embarcadero (the United States)
- Hotel chain: Four Seasons Hotels and Resorts

General information
- Location: United States, 222 Sansome Street; San Francisco, California
- Coordinates: 37.7925°N 122.4005°W
- Opening: 1986
- Cost: US$83 million
- Owner: Westbrook Partners
- Management: Four Seasons Hotels and Resorts

Height
- Height: 219.8 m (721 ft)

Technical details
- Floor count: 11

Design and construction
- Architect: Skidmore, Owings & Merrill

Other information
- Number of rooms: 148
- Number of suites: 7
- Number of restaurants: Orafo

The Four Seasons Hotel San Francisco at Embarcadero is a luxury hotel that occupies the top 11 floors of 48 story office tower of 345 California Center at 222 Sansome Street in the financial district of San Francisco, California. Completed in 1986, the 345 California Center tower is the fifth-tallest in the city, at 211.8 m (695 ft). Initially planned as condominiums, the twin towers of hotel were situated at 45-degree angles relative to the rest of the building, connected to each other by several glass skybridges that offer views of the San Francisco Bay Area.

The hotel opened in 1986 as the Mandarin Oriental, San Francisco. In February 2015, the hotel was sold to Loews Hotels and renamed the Loews Regency San Francisco. In May 2019, Loews sold the hotel to investment company Westbrook Partners. The hotel closed for renovations at the end of 2019, and the Four Seasons Hotels group assumed management, renaming it "Four Seasons Hotel San Francisco at Embarcadero" (although the Embarcadero runs several blocks away from the building). The hotel was originally set to reopen on May 1, 2020, but the outbreak of the COVID-19 pandemic forced the opening to be postponed to October 1, 2020. As the pandemic quickly worsened, the newly opened hotel soon closed again, on December 20, 2020. It reopened on June 16, 2021.

== Gallery ==
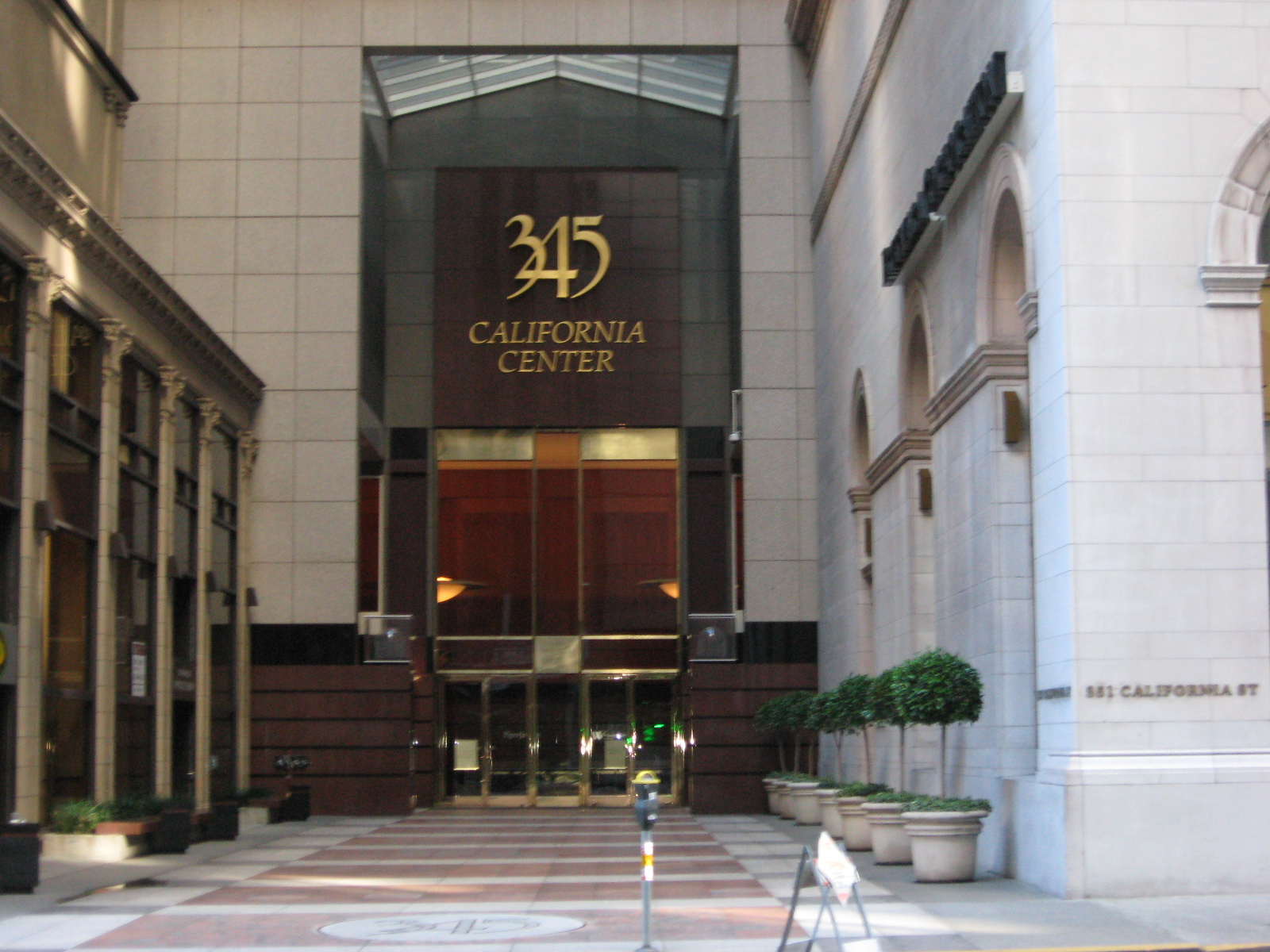
345 California lobby

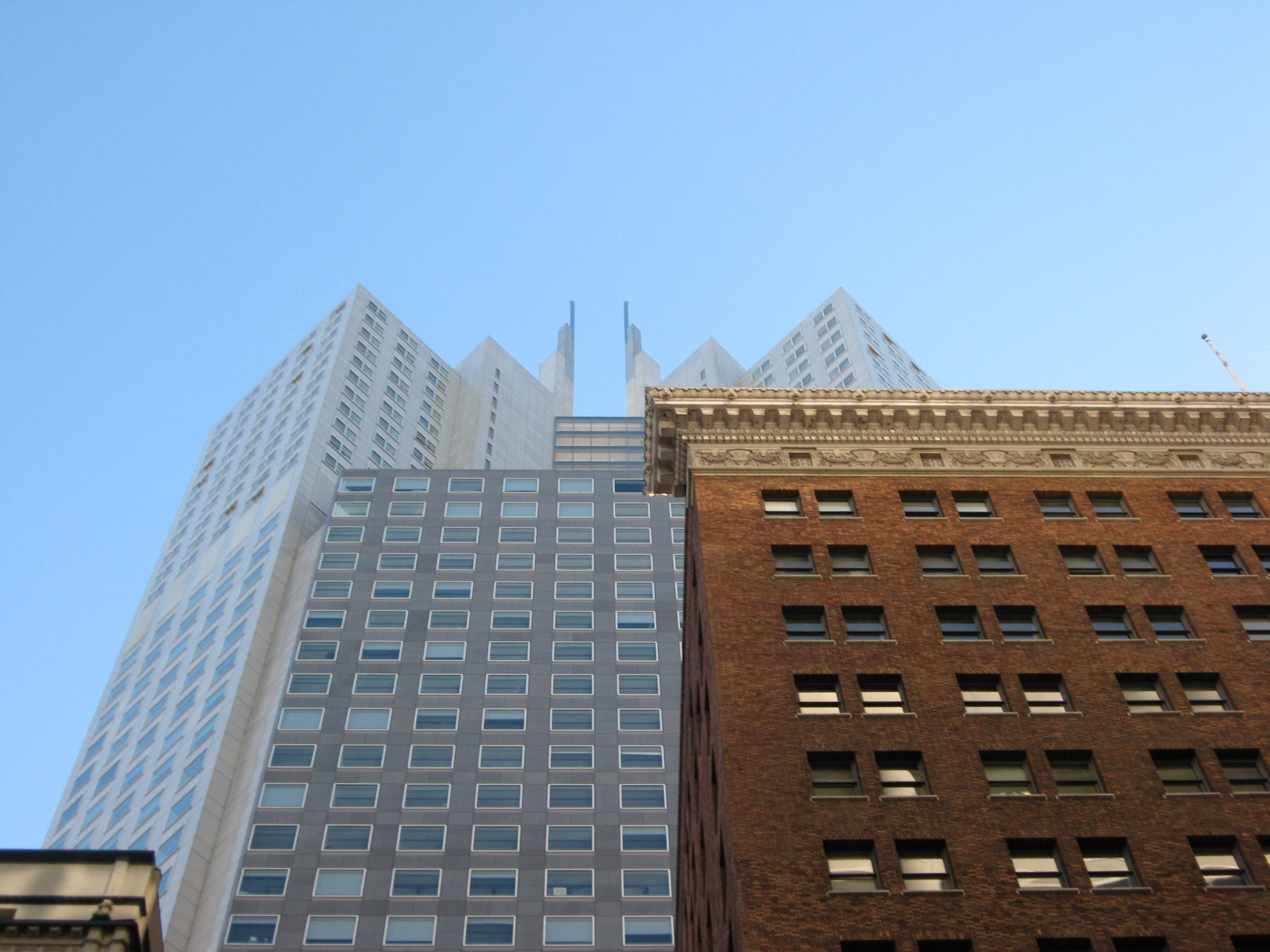
The building's twin spires

== See also ==
- Four Seasons Private Residences at 706 Mission Street
- List of tallest buildings in San Francisco
