= W San Francisco =

Hotel in San Francisco, California

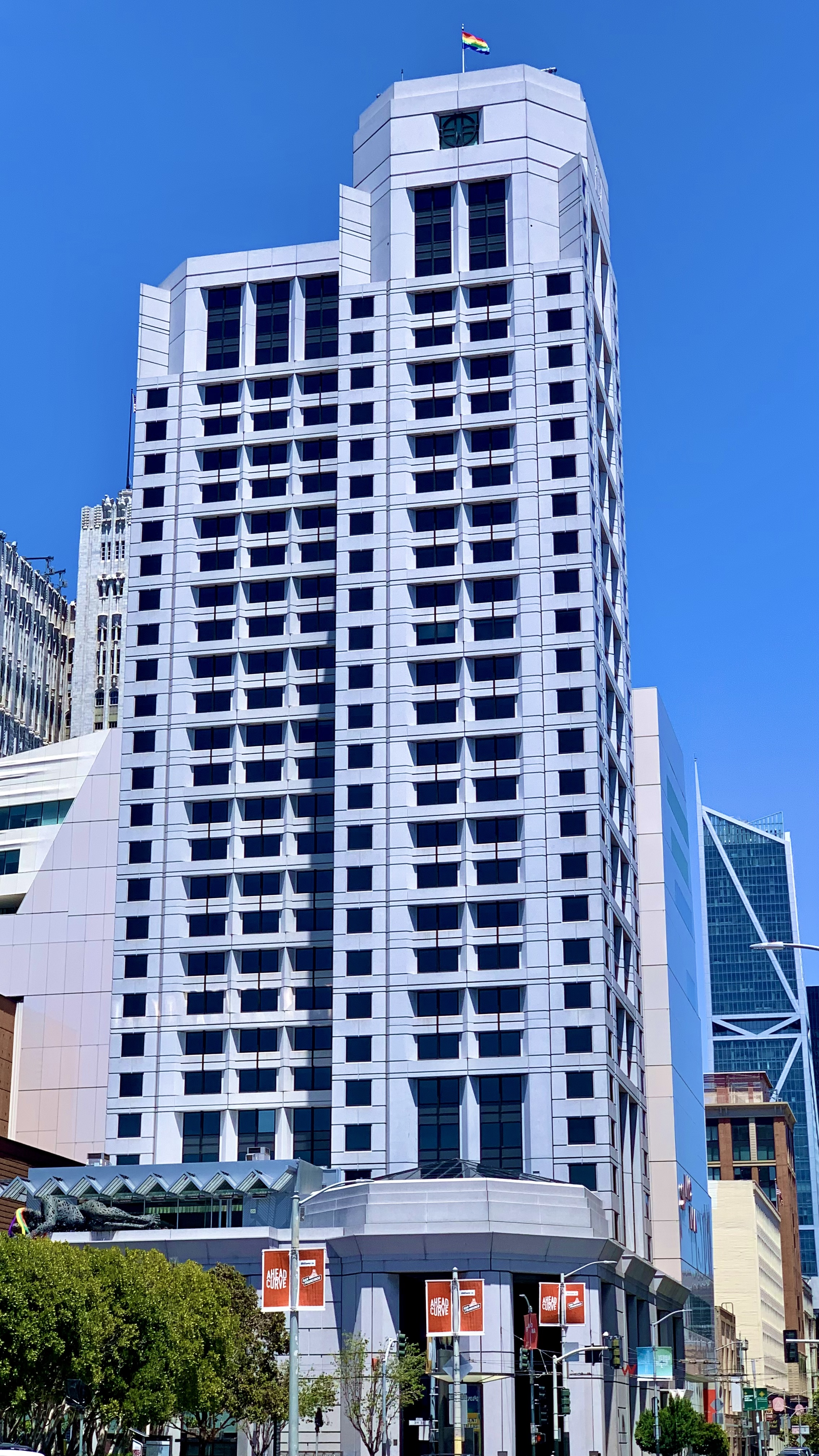
- In 2021

- Location within San Francisco Location within California Location within the United States
- Hotel chain: W Hotels

General information
- Location: United States, 181 Third Street; San Francisco, California
- Coordinates: 37.785444°N 122.400444°W
- Opening: 1999
- Owner: Keck Seng Investments
- Operator: Marriott International

Height
- Height: 96 m (315 ft)

Technical details
- Floor count: 31

Design and construction
- Architects: Hornberger + Worstell; Middlebrook + Louie Structural Engineers

Other information
- Number of rooms: 389
- Number of suites: 12
- Number of restaurants: 1

Website
- Official website

W San Francisco is a 31-floor, 96 m (315 ft) highrise luxury boutique hotel in San Francisco, California located next to the San Francisco Museum of Modern Art and across from Moscone Center. The tower was constructed by Webcor Builders and opened in 1999. The building was the tallest concrete-framed structure in San Francisco until The Paramount was completed three years later. The hotel contains 401 rooms operated by W Hotel, which is under the same operator (Marriott International) as the nearby St. Regis Museum Tower.

== See also ==
- List of tallest buildings in San Francisco
