= St. Regis Museum Tower =

Skyscraper in San Francisco, California

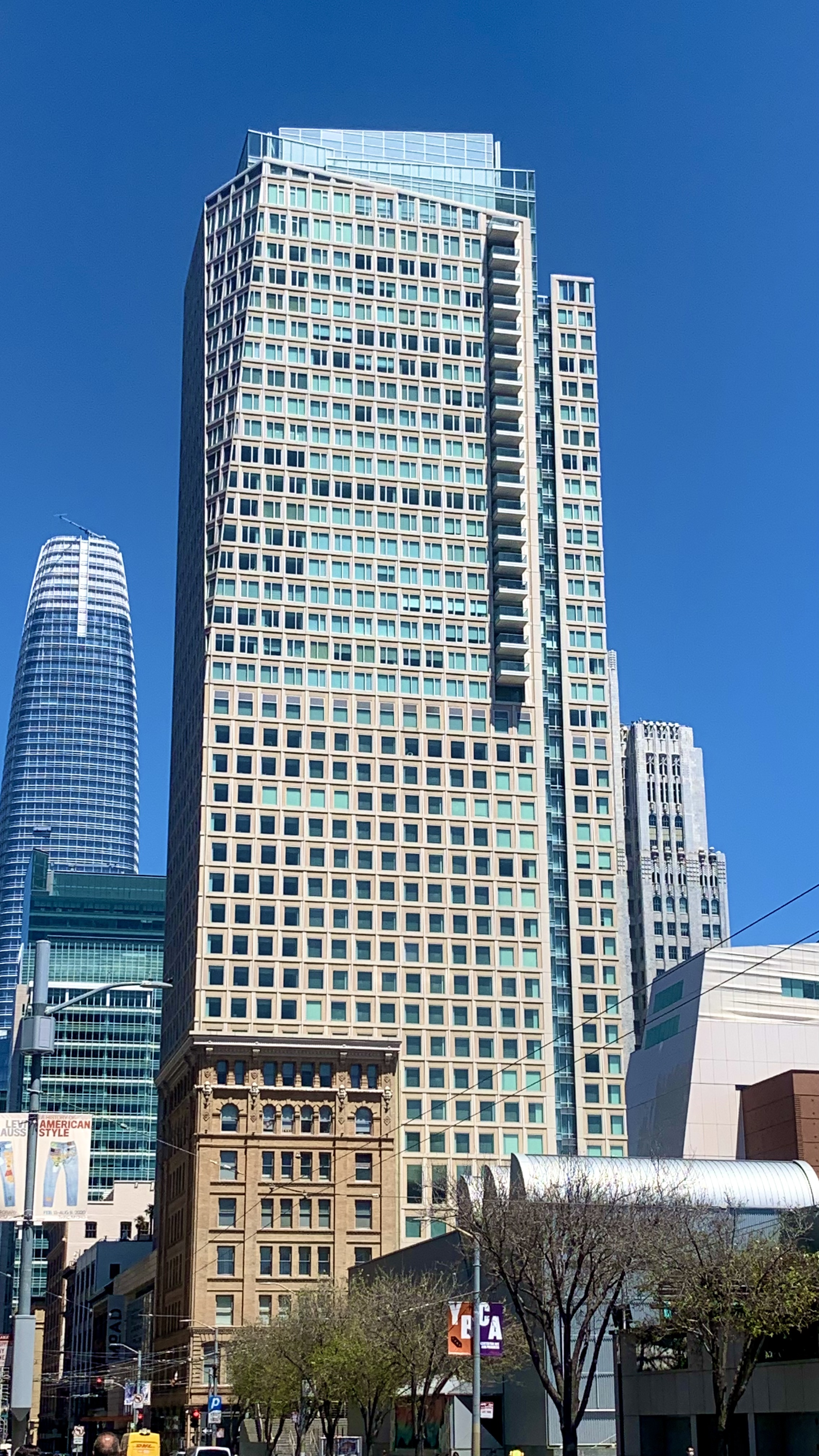
- In 2021

- Location within San Francisco St. Regis Museum Tower (California) St. Regis Museum Tower (the United States)
- Alternative names: St. Regis San Francisco
- Hotel chain: St. Regis Hotels & Resorts

General information
- Status: Completed
- Type: Hotel, residential
- Architectural style: Neomodern
- Location: 125 Third Street, San Francisco, California
- Coordinates: 37°47′10.68″N 122°24′4.68″W
- Construction started: 2001
- Completed: 2005
- Management: Marriott International

Height
- Roof: 484 ft (148 m)

Technical details
- Floor count: 42

Design and construction
- Architect: Skidmore, Owings and Merrill

Other information
- Number of rooms: 376
- Number of suites: 90

The St. Regis Museum Tower is a luxury hotel and residential skyscraper in the South of Market neighborhood in San Francisco, California, United States. It is just outside the Financial District on the corner of Mission Street and Third Street. On the first three floors of the tower is the Museum of the African Diaspora. It is the 30th tallest building in San Francisco.

== History ==
Construction started in 2001 and the building officially opened in 2005. It was remodeled in April 2022. The tower has 90 suites, 286 high end hotel units, and 376 rooms total. At the time of its completion, it was the tallest concrete building west of the Mississippi River.

In November 2023, General Secretary of the Chinese Communist Party Xi Jinping stayed in the presidential suite during the APEC United States 2023 meeting.

== Gallery ==
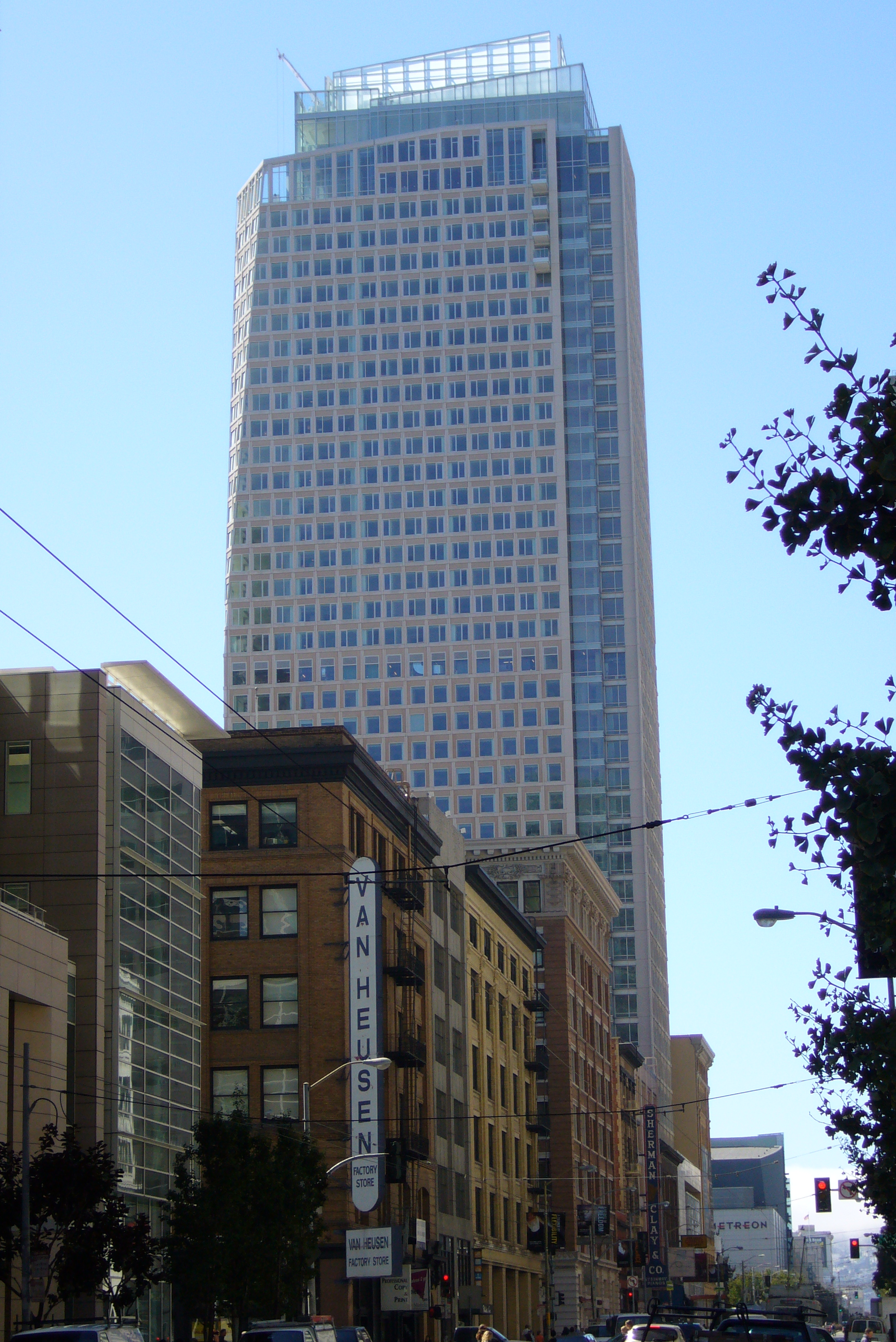
St. Regis shortly before completion

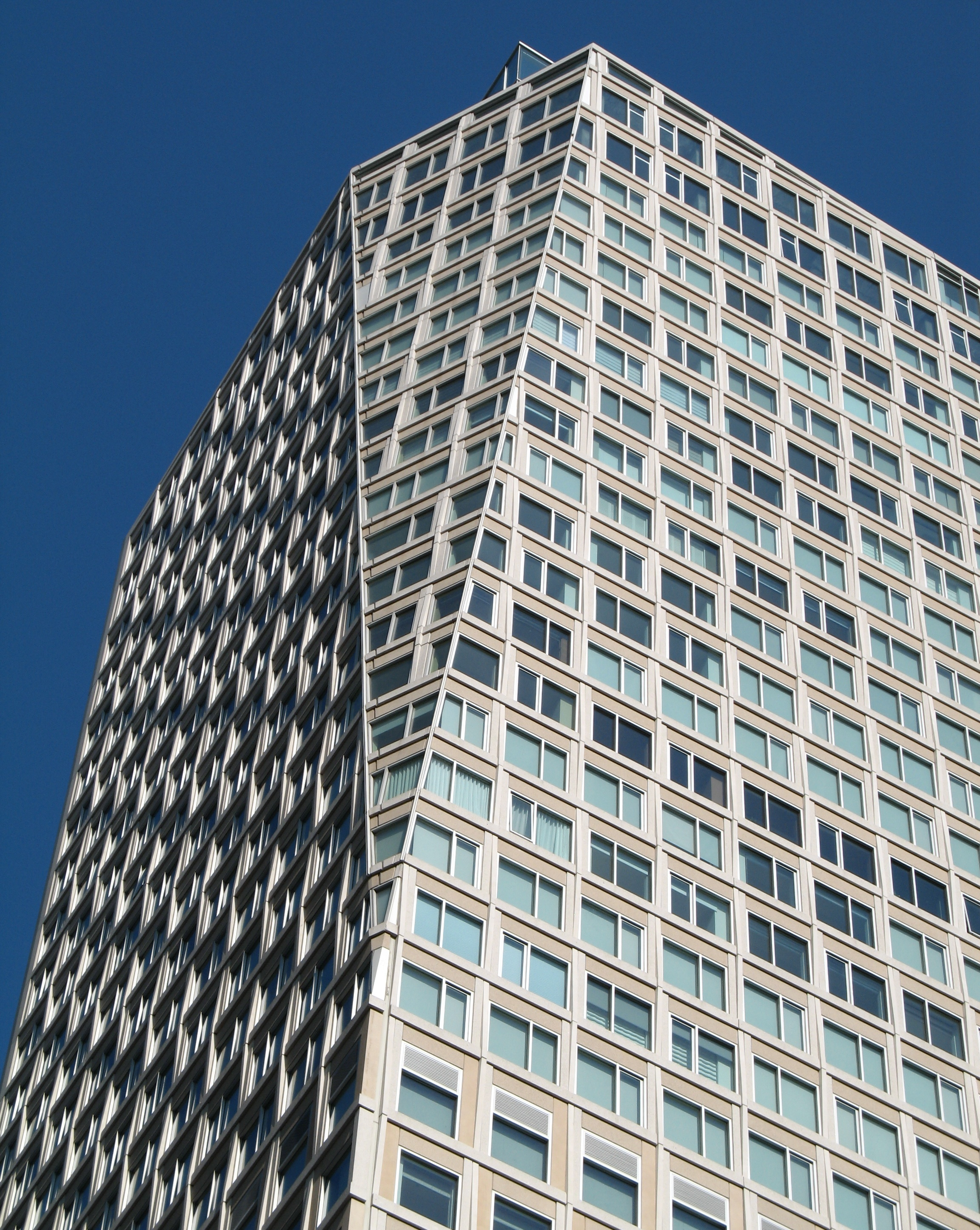
Facade of St. Regis

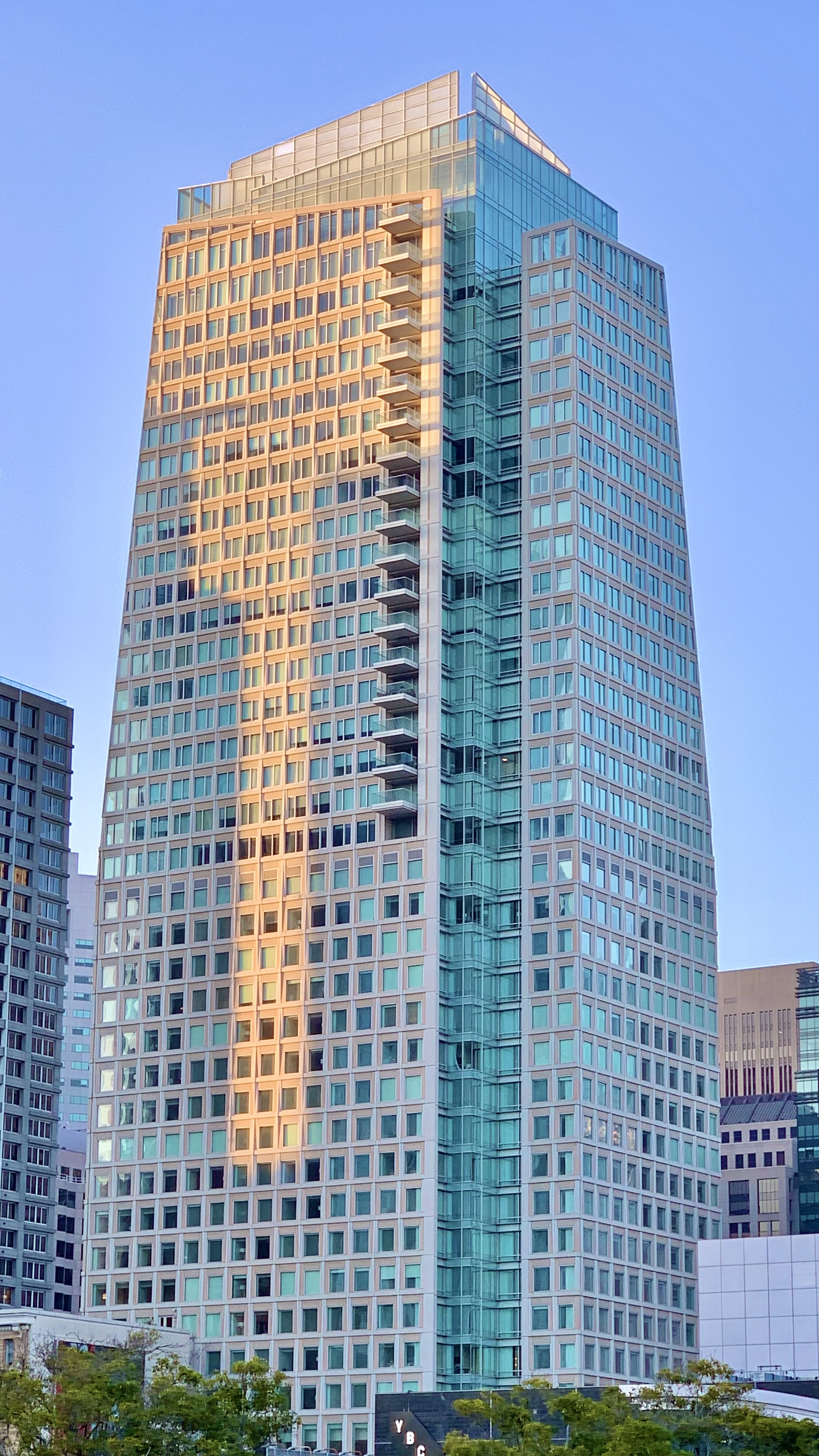
St. Regis as seen from a park

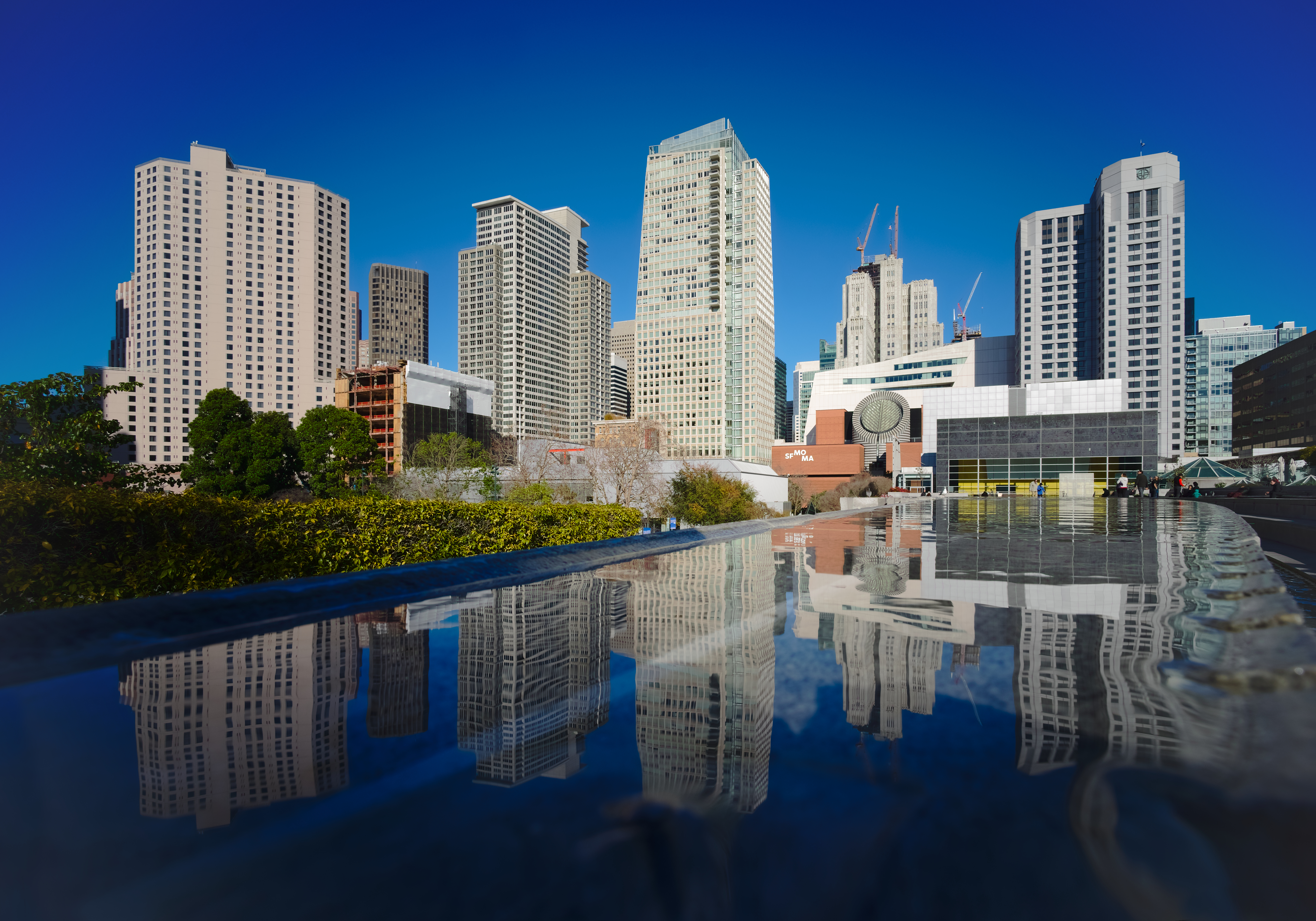
South of Market skyline viewed from Yerba Buena Gardens

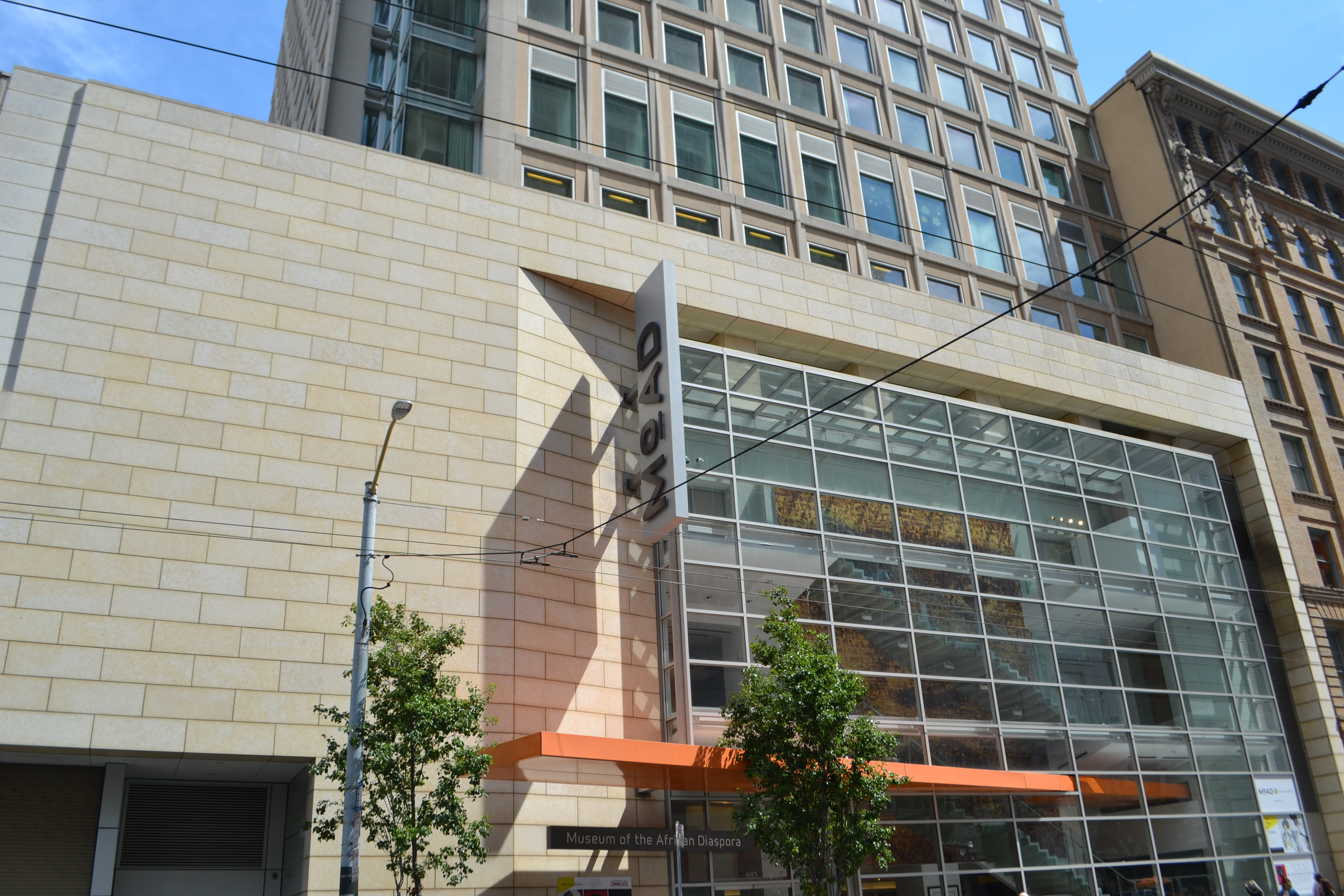
Entrance to the Museum of the African Diaspora

== See also ==
- List of tallest buildings in San Francisco
