= The Portal (San Francisco) =

Planned transit project in San Francisco

Overview
- Other name(s): Downtown Rail Extension, DTX
- Status: Planned
- Owner: Peninsula Corridor Joint Powers Board (PCJPB)
- Locale: San Francisco, California
- Stations: 2
- Website: www.tjpa.org/portaldtx

Service
- Type: Railroad
- System: Caltrain; CHSR
- Operator(s): PCJBP; California High-Speed Rail Authority

Technical
- Line length: 1.3 mi (2.09 km)
- Number of tracks: 2-6
- Character: underground commuter / high-speed railway tunnel
- Track gauge: 4 ft 8 1/2 in (1,435 mm) standard gauge
- Electrification: Overhead line, 25 kV 60 Hz AC

The Portal, also known as the Downtown Rail Extension (DTX), is a planned second phase of the Salesforce Transit Center (also known as the Transbay Transit Center (TTC)). When complete, it will extend the Caltrain Peninsula Corridor commuter rail line from its current northern terminus at 4th and King via a 1.3-mile (2.1 km) tunnel. The new terminus will be near the Financial District and will provide intermodal connections to BART, Muni, Transbay AC Transit buses, and long-distance buses. In addition, the California High Speed Rail Authority (CHSRA) plans to use DTX and the Caltrain-owned Peninsula Corridor for service on the CHSRA San Francisco–San Jose segment. The Caltrain Modernization Program (CalMod), which included electrification of the line and acquisition of electrified rolling stock, was a prerequisite, since the former diesel locomotives were not suitable for use in a tunnel.

Estimated at $6 billion in 2018, it was projected in 2023 to cost $8.2B, more than the entire first phase of the Transit Center. Only the "train box", the structural shell surrounding the lowest level of the TTC, has been funded as part of Phase 1 construction. As of 2018, full funding has not been obtained for the entire Phase 2 project. The Transbay Joint Powers Authority (TJPA) is seeking funding from various federal (Federal Transit Administration New Starts grants), state (SB1, the CAHSR project), regional, and local sources.

From about 2013 to 2018, the final route between the current 4th and King terminus and the TTC was uncertain. Former San Francisco Mayor Ed Lee had proposed an alternative route in 2015 which would bypass 4th and King, extending Caltrain and high-speed rail to the Transbay Terminal through a new tunnel branching from the existing line at the 22nd Street station, then following a route generally under Third Street to TTC. In 2018, the San Francisco Planning department announced the preferred final route: a new tunnel under Pennsylvania Avenue that would connect to the originally designed DTX route from 4th and King to the TTC. In addition, the TTC is a candidate for the San Francisco terminus of a second Transbay Tube between San Francisco and Alameda Island, which would add direct BART/ Regional train service.

== Stations and service patterns ==
The design of DTX includes, as of the 2015 environmental impact report, two new below-grade stations:

- 4th and Townsend: an underground station adjacent to the current 4th and King Caltrain terminal
- Salesforce Transit Center: a station on the lowest level of Salesforce Transit Center that opened in August 2018.

Both stations would be fully electrified with overhead wires to accommodate electrified Caltrain and high-speed rail trains. Initial plans for the transit center station called for an underground pedestrian tunnel connecting to the nearby Embarcadero station, allowing for subterranean transfers to BART and Muni, but this was later scrapped as a cost-saving measure.

Though the service patterns to these stations is not finalized as of 2018, both Caltrain and the California High-Speed Rail project intend to run trains to one or both of these stations.

The Salesforce Transit Center station is planned to contain six tracks and three island platforms for trains. The plans studied in the EIR propose allocating the two northerly tracks to Caltrain and the four southerly tracks to HSR. An April 2018 study on the proposed operations of the terminal concluded that three tracks are needed in the DTX tunnel leading to the Transbay station, and furthermore that Caltrain and HSR would need to share all six tracks at Transbay for reliable operations.

== Cost and project funding ==
As of April 2018, the project had an estimated total cost of $6 billion.

Initially, $600 million of funding was allocated to the DTX but was reallocated due to cost overruns on the Transbay Transit Center Project. Regional Measure 3, a bridge toll increase in the Bay Area that passed in the June 2018 election, allocates $325 million to the project.

In October 2018, the San Francisco Board of Supervisors voted no-confidence on the TJPA and suspended funds for Phase 2 of the construction project.

In 2020, the Transportation Authority allocated half-cent sales tax funds to the Transbay Joint Powers Authority to undertake development work for the project.

In May 2024, the Federal Transit Administration pledged $3.38 billion towards the project.

In August 2024, the Transbay Joint Powers Authority selected the AECOM-led Portal Connectors team as the project's manager.

== History ==
Even before it was completed, in 1863 the San Francisco and San Jose Railroad (SF&SJ) was urged to build passenger and freight stations along Market Street. Once complete, the SF&SJ offered train service into San Francisco with a northern terminus at a now-demolished station at 18th and Valencia streets. Soon after Southern Pacific (SP) took over the Peninsula Commute route from the SF&SJ, SP would go on to build the Bayshore Cutoff in 1907, rerouting the line between San Francisco and San Bruno to the San Francisco Bay shoreline. The relocated station in San Francisco near Third and Townsend was soon deemed "[notoriously] inadequate even for present passenger traffic" in 1910. Instead of moving the station closer to Market, SP built a new passenger terminal, the Third and Townsend Depot, at the same location in San Francisco in 1914, anticipating the need for increased capacity to handle visitors traveling to the 1915 Panama–Pacific International Exposition.

=== Southern Pacific plans ===
Starting in 1909, SP purchased sixteen complete blocks in a direct line between the foot of Market and the existing Third and Townsend depot at a cost of $5 million (equivalent to $121 million in 2024), and the San Francisco Call believed this meant a station uniting SP with the Santa Fe and Western Pacific near the San Francisco Ferry Building was imminent. In 1911, SP purchased a key property which had previously housed a home for war veterans, and the San Francisco Call again speculated SP would shortly build a new depot at Market and Beale. When the new Third and Townsend Depot was announced in November 1912, Charles S. Fee, SP passenger traffic manager, denied the prior rumors putting a new depot at Market and Beale, saying the Ferry Building would be handling the bulk of the traffic and that a Market and Beale station could not be completed in time for Panama–Pacific service.

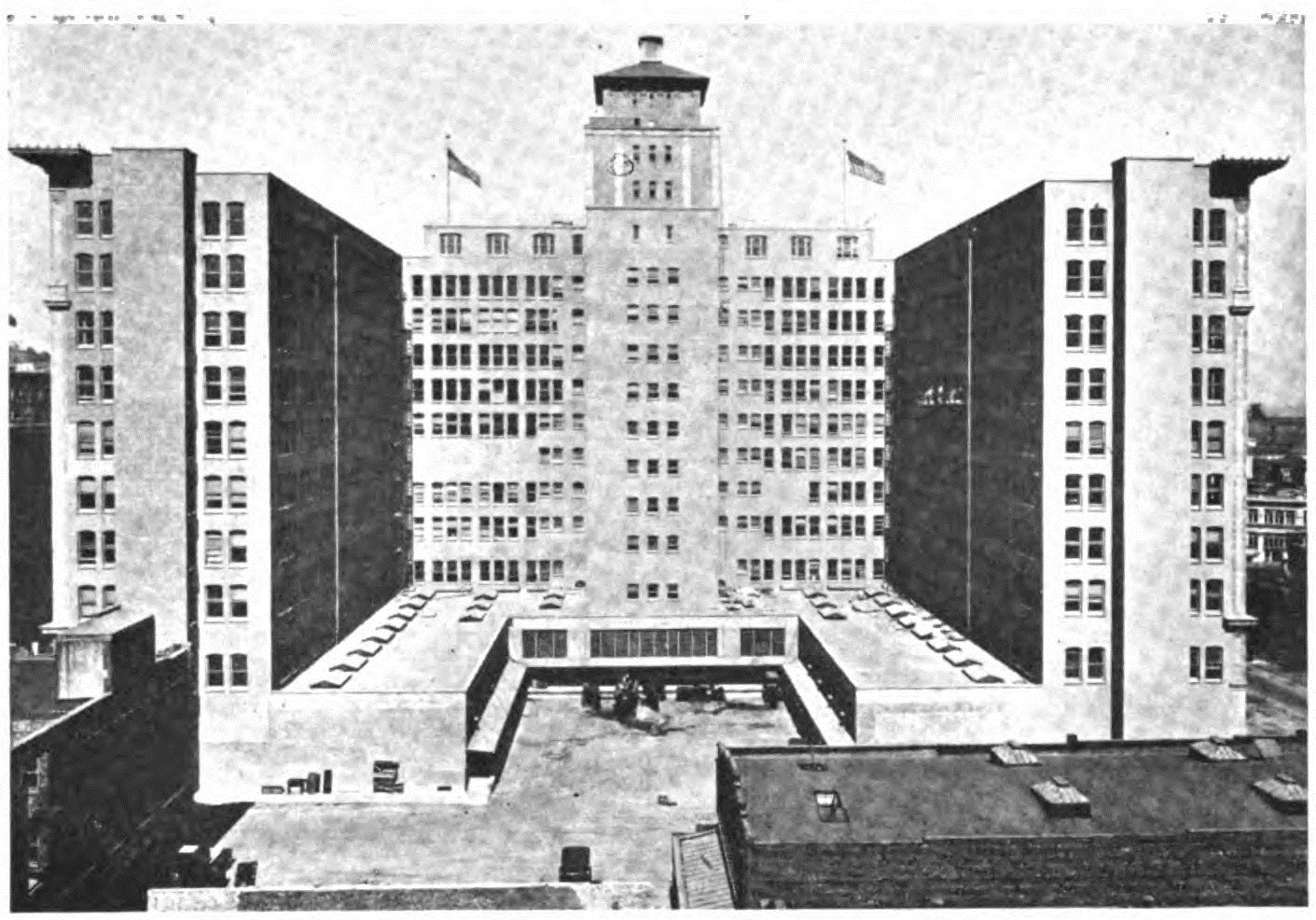
"Courtyard" of the 1917 Southern Pacific Building at One Market Street in San Francisco

The San Francisco Chronicle speculated that Third and Townsend could have been announced as a bargaining tactic to knock down the asking price of the few landowners remaining between the existing station and Market and Beale. However, other observers understood the 1914 Spanish Revival Depot at Third and Townsend was intended as a "temporary" structure since SP planned to extend service to downtown San Francisco at some point in the future, as shown by the configuration of the new Southern Pacific General Office building at 1 Market Street. That building was completed in 1917 with an E-shaped floor plan, and Southern Pacific had retained tenancy of the first-floor spaces facing the "courtyard", implying that a ground-floor courtyard station space may have been planned for the future, but plans to extend the rails into downtown San Francisco were put on hold following the United States's entry into World War I and were never revived. Some of the land was later sold to the federal government and used for the Rincon Annex post office and mail distribution center.

In 1955, the California Public Utilities Commission published a report to evaluate SP's Peninsula Commute service in the wake of a 1950 application to raise fares. The report noted "While the Peninsula Service furnishes a rapid rail transportation, particularly during morning and evening peak periods, it does not carry passengers within reasonable walking distance of downtown San Francisco" and "a considerable portion of the commuter's total traveling time is spent in transit between the S. P. Depot and downtown San Francisco, and at an additional expense to the commuter of 30¢ a day." By counting passengers who disembarked at 3rd and Townsend, the report concluded that 70% of passengers disembarking in San Francisco used Muni to reach their final destination, and the time spent on Muni could equal or exceed the time spent on SP's trains.

=== Planned BART takeover ===
During the planning phases of what would become BART, a planned Peninsula line would take over from the existing Southern Pacific commute service. Although that planned Peninsula line was proposed to be built on the existing SP right-of-way and enter a subway section at the intersection of 7th and Hooper Streets, a 1960 report noted SP still intended to extend service to downtown. A 1963 report to the San Francisco Board of Supervisors projected the inevitable decline of the Third and Townsend Depot once the planned San Mateo line of what would become BART was built:

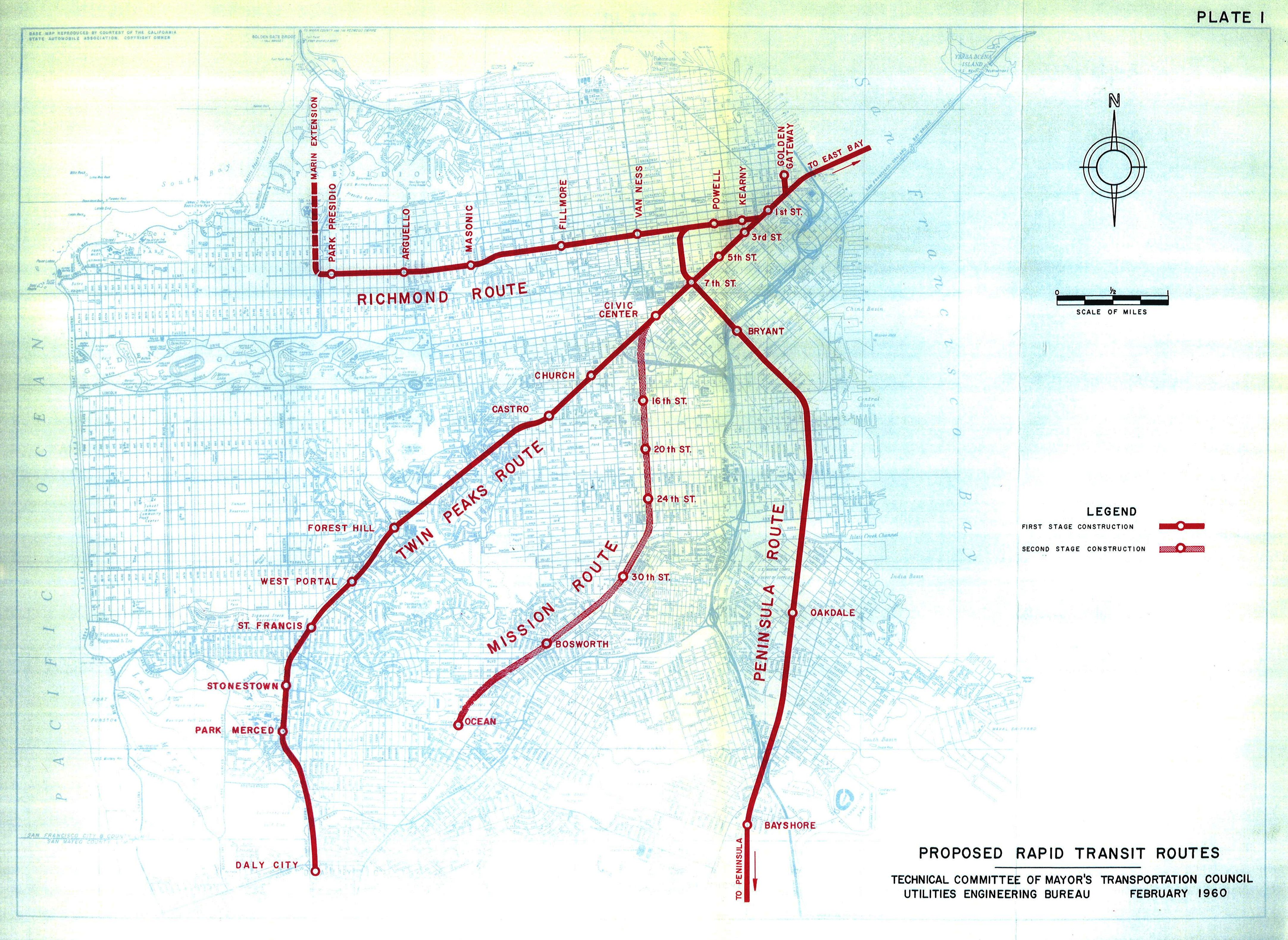
Preliminary plans for BART routes in San Francisco, including connections to Marin and the Peninsula (1960)

The Third and Townsend depot of the Southern Pacific Railway will continue as long distance terminal and as a commuter terminal until such time as rapid transit system is developed on the Peninsula. The fate of rail passenger service is difficult to predict, but it is apparent that no major investment in new facilities is likely to occur and that the Third and Townsend depot, once relieved of commuter operations, will be used by no more than two or three train arrivals and departures a day.

— Department of City Planning and Mario J. Ciampi, excerpt from the report Downtown San Francisco (September 1963)

Despite the plans, BART service to San Mateo County via the proposed Peninsula Line was dropped after that county pulled out of the BART district in December 1961, and SP never extended the commuter rail service from San Jose to the downtown Financial District. A 1968 Rapid Transit Service to San Francisco International Airport and to the Peninsula report for the City of San Francisco proposed an underground extension taking the SP line to Second and Market. The 1968 Rapid Transit report said "the Southern Pacific suburban railway from San Jose to San Francisco is good as far as it goes, but it does not go far enough into San Francisco. The 'Southern Pacific Depot' at Third and Townsend Streets ... is almost one mile south of the destination of 80 percent of its patrons" and called "fast and frequent service ... a prime need for by-passing and hopefully reducing peak-hour freeway congestion," along with improved transit service to San Francisco International Airport (SFO) (later realized in 2003 with the completion of the BART to SFO extension) and the Bayview-Hunters Point area of southeastern San Francisco (realized in 2007 after the new T Third Muni Metro line went into revenue service). Even though upgraded service from SP would be the "cheapest and quickest" of the options studied, SP stated they did not want to share the existing tracks (and freight service) with increased passenger rail operations, making plans to extend the rails to Second and Market unfeasible. The Third and Townsend Depot was demolished in the late 1970s after the current station at 4th and King opened one block away in 1975.

=== PERSUS and PENTAP ===
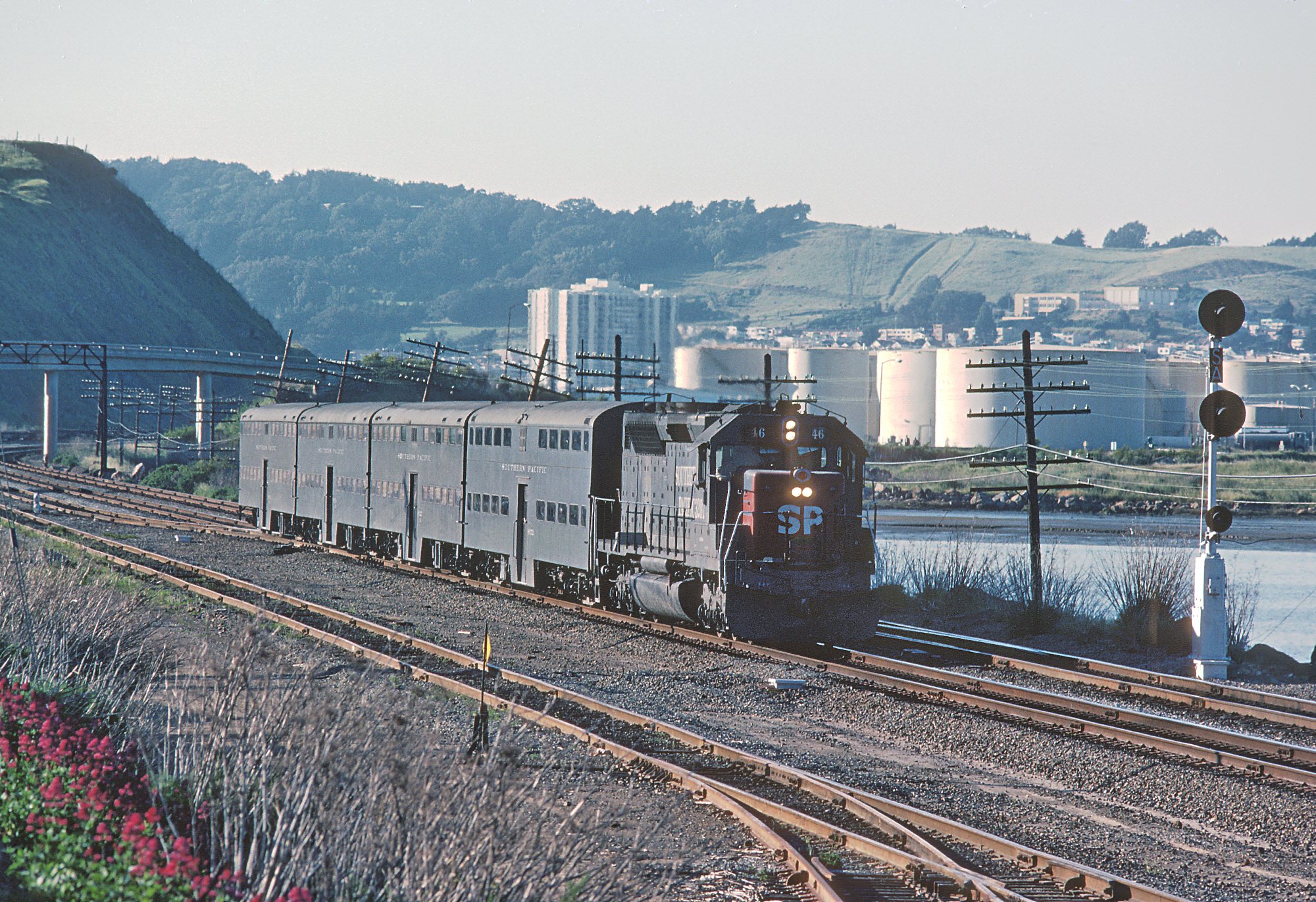
Most commuters on SP's Peninsula Commute, shown here passing Brisbane Lagoon, worked in the Financial District and disembarked at Third and Townsend

In 1975, the Metropolitan Transportation Commission (MTC) published the Feasibility of Upgrading Peninsula Passenger Rail Service (PERSUS) report. PERSUS noted the single largest destination, San Francisco's downtown Financial District, was not directly served by the SP Peninsula Commute and called the Townsend Street station "an obstacle to the [Central Business District]-destined commuter who must expend additional time and fares, and a deterrent to the off-peak rider who must contend with less frequent transit service or pedestrian hazards on the streets." In addition, SFO was "the largest traffic attractor located between San Francisco and San Jose" and "physical conditions for establishing a [rail] link are unusually favorable" because the SP line approaches the airport quite closely. PERSUS proposed three alternatives, which could be implemented in successive phases:

1. Minor Upgrade: retain the existing service and terminals, but improve access to stations on the Peninsula and San Francisco.
2. Major Upgrade: move the San Francisco terminal, increase service frequencies, and begin investment of public funds.
3. Transit Conversion: increase service frequencies so passengers would wait no more than fifteen minutes between trains, separate passenger and freight rail traffic with additional tracks, complete grade separation, and build an airport station.

An extension to the Transbay Terminal would be part of the Major Upgrade, with an alternative to terminate SP service at Daly City by rerouting the SP line onto the Ocean View Branch through Colma, which had discontinued service after the completion of the Bayshore Cutoff in 1907. The Transit Conversion would free casual riders from having to look up specific timetables and plan trips, obviating the need for a Peninsula BART extension, and it was projected to more than double ridership.

PERSUS was followed by the Peninsula Transit Alternatives Project study (PENTAP) in 1977. PENTAP recommended upgraded SP service, including more frequent reverse-peak trains (southbound in the mornings, and northbound in the evenings). As an alternative to extending SP to the Financial District, PENTAP advocated for more frequent bus service to the SP terminal at Fourth and Townsend.

=== The Caltrans CalTrain ===
By the late 1970s, SP was faced with falling passenger counts and revenues, leading SP to petition the California Public Utilities Commission to discontinue the Peninsula Commute service entirely in May 1977, which received a preliminary affirmative ruling in July 1979. In response, Assemblymember Lou Papan introduced AB 1853 in 1977 to preserve the service by subsidizing ticket prices and SP's operation. Peninsula Commute ridership was so sensitive to gasoline shortages that passenger counts jumped by 40% in May and June 1979. California would take over financial responsibility for the Peninsula Commute in July 1980.

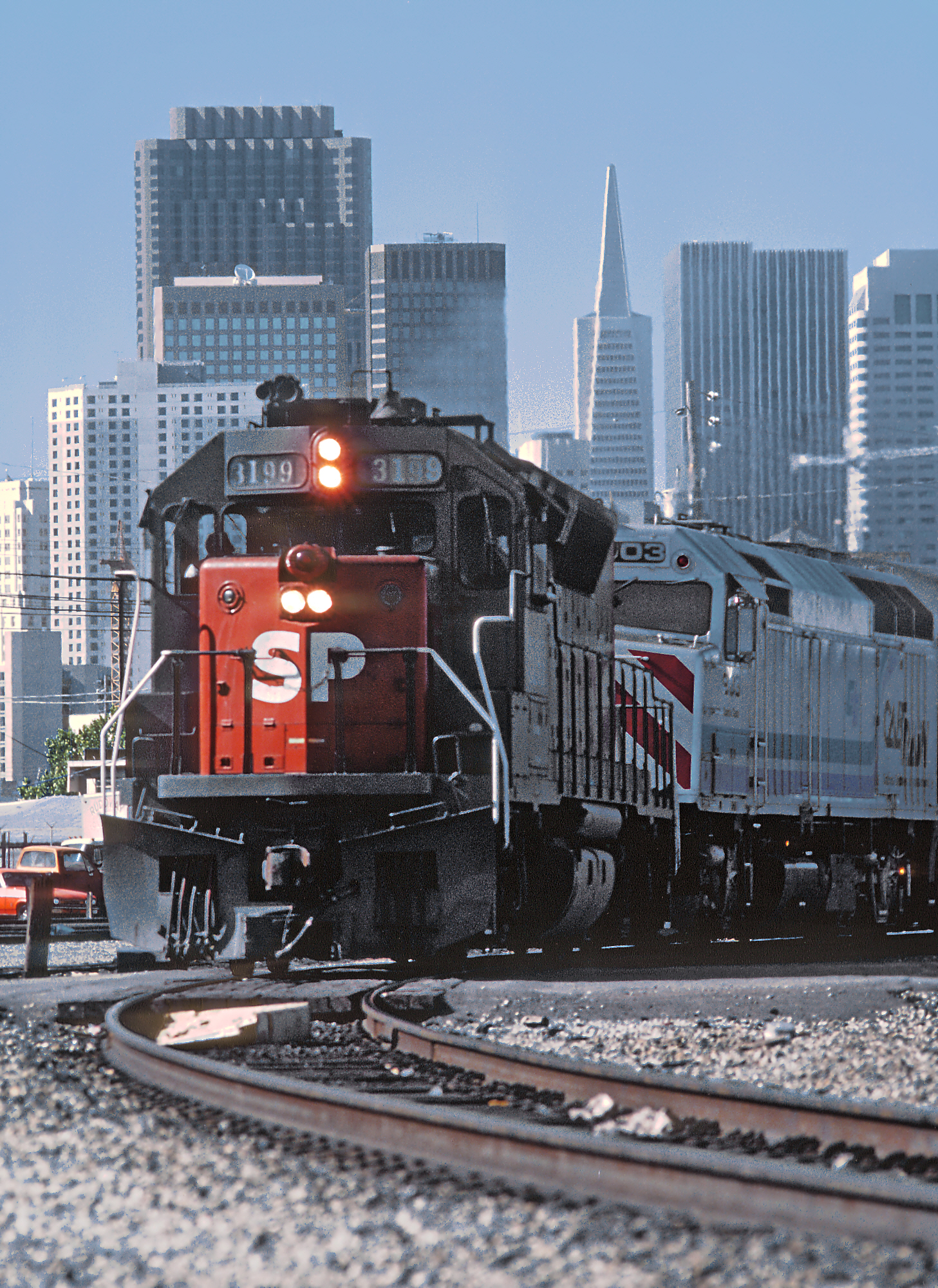
Telephoto compression makes this train appear to be much closer to downtown than its actual location (7th and King) in 1985.

A draft report prepared in 1978 to estimate the environmental impact of the SP petition to discontinue service echoed the conclusions reached by the PUC in 1955, stating "the downtown financial district of [San Francisco] is the principal destination for a large percentage of Peninsula commuters, and most SP commuters."

After California took over the Peninsula Commute and set up the CalTrain commuter rail service, the downtown extension was called "critical to the survival of the service" in a 1982 public hearing. During that hearing, Mr. Fred Barton, Deputy District Director of Rail Operations for Caltrans, noted "the existing passenger service provided by SP is not utilizing its full potential in serving the travel demands of the Peninsula residents who are employed in downtown San Francisco. This inadequacy in service is mainly due to the location of the present SP terminal which is remote from the high density employment centers in the city's financial district. In fact, an additional twenty to thirty minute travel time and a transfer to Muni bus service is required by the commuters in order to reach the financial district."

The legislature required an annual report detailing planned improvements to improve ridership as part of 1981's AB 1010. The subsequent 1984 Rail Passenger Development Plan called for downtown station extensions in both San Francisco and San Jose. As evidence, when Muni discontinued a dedicated shuttle service between 4th and Townsend and the Financial District, CalTrain ridership dropped by 18 percent, prompting Caltrans to declare a downtown extension should be implemented no later than 1991.

Because the current San Francisco station location is acknowledged to be a major deterent [sic] to train ridership, Caltrans is arranging for increased bus shuttle service between the 4th and Townsend Streets station and primary San Francisco employment centers. During the period in which Muni formerly operated a dedicated service to the financial district, there was 18-percent higher weekday train ridership than at present. [...]
Beyond the range of the current Five-Year Plan, the extension of the Peninsula Commute Service to downtown intermodal terminals in San Jose and San Francisco would remedy the major deterrent to efficient utilization of the service. Ridership is now increasing again, but full potential can never be reached without improved service to downtown terminal locations. Without improved access, the service will continue to face the historical cycle of ridership fluctuations and the potential necessity for fare increases.
Caltrans proposes the extension of the Peninsula Commute Service to new intermodal terminals in downtown San Francisco and San Jose. When completed, these extensions will provide the Peninsula rider with a single uninterrupted ride to either of the two major downtown destinations, as well as provide the Peninsula Service with closer connections to the other major transit carriers in San Francisco and San Jose. These extension proposals can and should be implemented in the next 5 to 7 years.

— Caltrans, Rail Passenger Development Plan (1984)

Caltrans went on to publish the 1984 San Francisco Terminal Relocation Study, which called for a below-grade alignment from I-280 and Sixth to the Transbay Terminal and predicted that a downtown extension would attract 30,000 new boardings per day. The 1987 Interim Upgrade Study called the downtown extension "the single most important improvement that can be made to the Peninsula commuter line at the present time." In 1989, the Federal Transit Administration authorized a draft environmental impact report, which was completed in 1991 but never published or reviewed as the share of local funding for the terminal relocation never materialized.

However, Caltrans was being pressured to drop funding for CalTrain. By state law, the subsidies for the rail service would have been discontinued as the farebox recovery ratio failed to breach 40%, unless a waiver was granted. Once the state determined the train service provided mainly a regional, and not a statewide benefit, control of CalTrain should more appropriately be passed to a regional agency. Accordingly, a three-county agency, the Peninsula Corridor Joint Powers Board (PCJPB) was formed in 1991 and with the help of state funds, PCJPB purchased the Peninsula Corridor line and right-of-way from SP in 1992 for $202 million ($463 million adjusted for inflation).

=== Peninsula Corridor Joint Powers Board: First attempt ===
Alternative routes to a downtown terminal were studied in 1995.

Once PCJPB took over the stewardship of Caltrain in 1992, the downtown extension was identified as a high-priority project, and a study was undertaken in 1993 to evaluate nine project alternatives. PCJPB leadership voted in March 1994 under Resolution 1994-8 to extend service to downtown by 1996. Projected weekday Caltrain ridership was anticipated to double (compared to 21,700 daily passengers in 1995) with the completion of a downtown extension. Under Resolution 1994-8, electrified trains were planned past 4th and King down either King, Townsend, or Brannan, bringing tracks underground at Fourth Street, and then to one of two alternative downtown terminal sites selected for further study: a locally preferred alignment, which terminated at Market and Beale, nearly the same alignment as the 1911 plans; or the Transbay Terminal. A new terminal at the Market and Beale site would have either two or three underground levels and either two or four tracks terminating at Market or Mission Streets. Alternatively, if selected, a new terminal at Transbay would be either an aerial or underground platform.

Other alternatives identified during early studies included short or long tunnel options, different locations for the tracks to turn north, and two different tunnel construction methods. An additional east–west alignment along Brannan was dropped from consideration in 1995 to avoid disruption to local business. Ventilation requirements would depend on the length of the tunnel selected, and some options would require new locomotives powered by natural gas or electricity to replace or supplement the existing diesel-powered fleet, increasing the costs. In 1995, estimates for the new terminal were projected to cost from US$491,000,000 (equivalent to $1,037,400,000 in 2025) to US$686,000,000 (equivalent to $1,449,500,000 in 2025).

Design options considered in 1995 (Note: This should be understood as four design options with some dependencies: 1. East–west alignment; 2. Tunnel length; 3. Downtown terminal location; 4. Construction method)
	Terminal location (Note: Either the east-west Transbay Terminal or the north-south Market/Beale)	Transbay Terminal (Note: Parallel to Market, within 1st, Mission, Beale, and Howard)		Market/Beale (Note: Perpendicular to Market, within Market, Main, Howard, and Beale)	
East-West alignment (Note: Either under King or under Townsend)	Tunnel length (Note: Short or Long, determines location of portal) Construction method (Note: Cut and cover or mined)	Short	Long	Short	Long
Townsend	Mined	Turns north at 3rd/Townsend		N/A	
Townsend	Mined	Portal at 5th & Townsend	Portal at 7th & Berry	N/A	
Townsend	Cut and cover	Turns north after 2nd/Townsend		Turns north at Beale/Embarcadero	
Townsend	Cut and cover	Portal at 5th & Townsend	Portal at 7th & Berry	Portal at 5th & Townsend	Portal at 7th & Berry
King	Mined	N/A		Turns north at 4th/King	
King	Mined	N/A		Portal at 6th & King	Portal at 7th & Berry
King	Cut and cover	Turns north after 2nd/King		Turns north at Beale/Embarcadero	
King	Cut and cover	Portal at 6th & King	Portal at 7th & Berry	Portal at 6th & King	Portal at 7th & Berry

Notes

In December 1995, the Market and Beale site was dropped for consideration as City of San Francisco planners were considering that location for a bus station. Since the Transbay Terminal itself was scheduled for demolition and redevelopment, the site of the Transbay Terminal was endorsed by PCJPB as the future downtown terminal.

=== Transbay Transit Center development ===
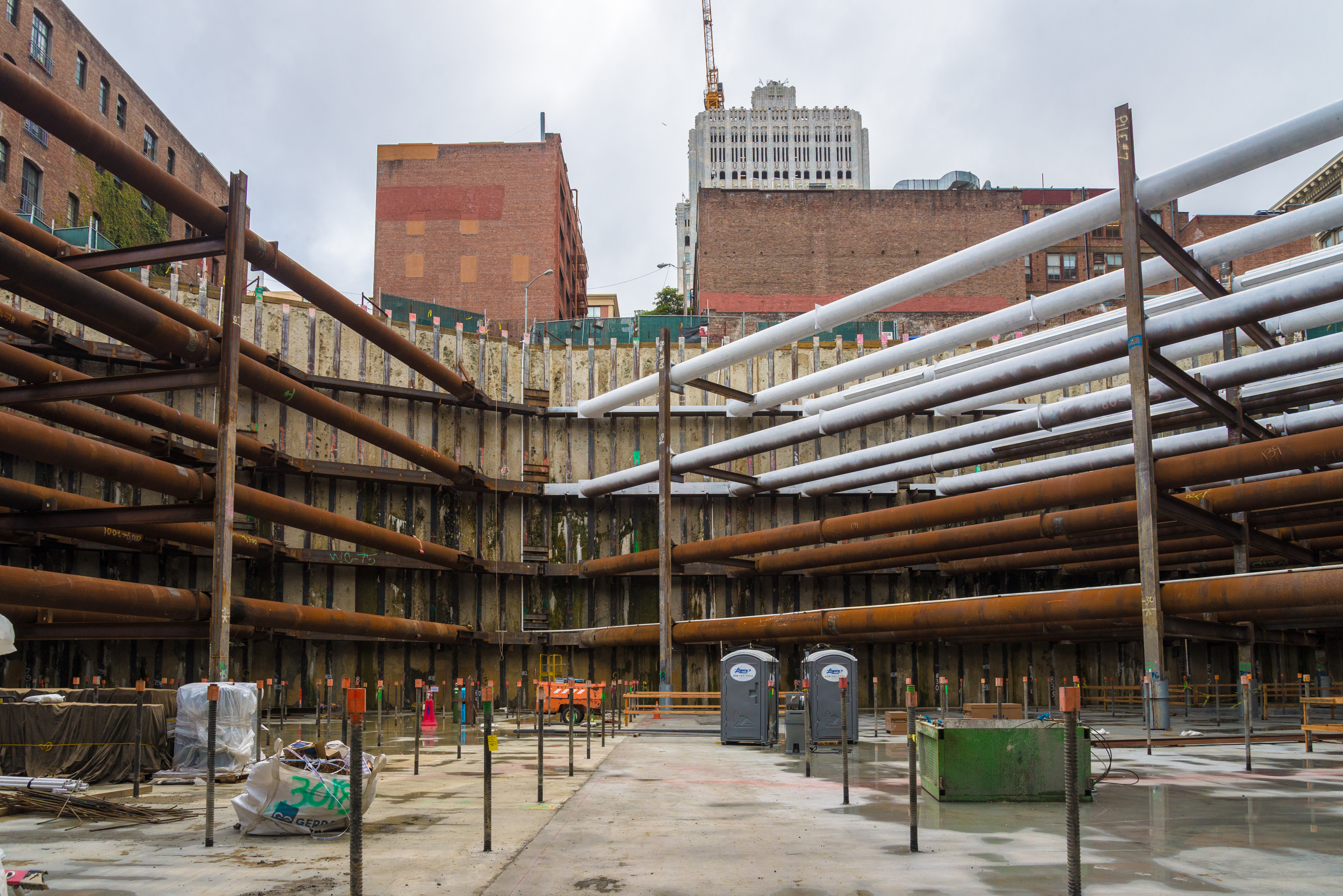
Temporary bracing during the construction of the underground train box at the Transbay Transit Center (2013)

While a draft environmental impact report was prepared in 1997 for the downtown extension by the Peninsula Corridor Joint Powers Board, the report was never certified and was abandoned in an incomplete state. Subsequently, the voters of San Francisco reaffirmed the project in the November 1999 election by approving Proposition H, which mandated the extension of Caltrain to a newly rebuilt Transbay transit facility and the electrification of Caltrain. At the time, the downtown extension was estimated to cost $600 million. In 2000, the City and County of San Francisco and the Peninsula Corridor Joint Powers Authority begin the environmental review process for the revived project. The Transbay Joint Powers Authority (TJPA) is established in 2001 in order to manage the project and oversee its design and implementation. The environmental review process concludes in 2004 with the publication of the final environmental impact report (FEIR), which is certified by the TJPA.

The TJPA's plan for the downtown extension splits the project into two phases. The phased plan was approved in 2006 with the adoption of the First Addendum to the 2004 FEIR. The first phase consists of the construction of the Transbay Transit Center, which contains a train box on its underground levels to accommodate Caltrain and high-speed rail. The second phase consists of the actual downtown extension, with an alignment that will carry trains from an underground station near 4th and King station to Second Street via Townsend Street, and then from Second Street into the train box in the Transbay Transit Center. The first phase broke ground in 2010 and opened to the public on August 11, 2018.

=== The Railyard Alternatives and I-280 Boulevard Feasibility Study ===
Approved DTX alignment with proposed PAX and Mission Bay alternatives under the RAB study (2018), including potential tail track loops

In 2013, Mayor Ed Lee pushed for a revised downtown extension plan that could substantially differ from the alignment approved in the 2004 EIR. The suggested revisions included moving the alignment to the Mission Bay neighborhood in order to accommodate new housing development and the new Warriors stadium that was in planning at the time. With the 2015 alternative Mission Bay alignment, trains would potentially run underground along Third Street. The trains would then bypass the existing terminus at Fourth and King, enabling the redevelopment of the Caltrain station and potential addition of infill housing. Another suggested revision included demolishing part of Interstate 280 to facilitate further development. Other proposed DTX routings included a loop so that trains may leave TTC as other trains are pulling in.

The study for these revisions, coordinated by the San Francisco Planning department, was called the Railyard Alternatives and I-280 Boulevard Feasibility (RAB) Study and was initially projected to complete in eight months. One of the goals of RAB was to propose grade separations for the surface rail segments, as the planned frequency of trains with the completion of CalMod and CAHSR meant that at-grade crossings at Mission Bay Drive and 16th Street could be blocked more than 1/3 of the time during peak commute hours. After five years, the results of the RAB study were released in May 2018. The RAB study considered three possible alternatives that would extend or replace the environmentally cleared DTX tunnel alignment:

1. Future with Surface Rail: DTX plus two grade separations created by trenching and depressing Mission Bay Dr & 16th St
2. Pennsylvania Ave Alignment: A tunneled extension of DTX under Pennsylvania Avenue
3. Mission Bay Alignment: An alternative tunneled extension of DTX under Third Street in Mission Bay

The study ultimately recommended the second alternative. Alternative 1 would create underpasses four to five stories deep and more than 1/2 mi (0.80 km) long, reducing pedestrian mobility and leaving the roads vulnerable to sea level rise. In addition, assuming the surface railyard at 4th and King is retained, trains would need a turnback track and a new portal near 6th and Townsend to avoid cumbersome maneuvers to access the portal at 7th and Berry. Both Alternatives 2 and 3 would remove the surface railyard and relocate it, presumably to a point further south in San Francisco. Alternative 3 would use potentially the largest tunnel boring machine in the United States for a single bore with stacked train tracks, and discards much of the route for DTX that had already received clearance; in addition, the effects on existing structures (such as the Lefty O'Doul Bridge and Oracle Park) would require further study, complicating the approval process and increasing engineering, cost, and environmental challenges. Alternative 2, also known as the Pennsylvania Avenue Extension (PAX) could be built as a separate project and connected to the approved DTX alignment in the future. Under PAX, trains would run in twin bored tunnels from a point near the southern end of the existing 22nd Street station.

In addition to the alternative alignments, RAB proposed moving the existing surface railyard, opening up land for potential housing or commercial development, and also proposed loop extensions out of the eastern end of the TTC to allow it to operate as a through-station, rather than a stub-end terminus, increasing capacity by overcoming the limited number of platforms in the train box. The proposed loops could be extended to Oakland and/or Alameda as well, complementing the existing Transbay Tube. The new proposal has an estimated cost of $6 billion and is projected to be complete in 2027.

A portion of funds for the project were put on hold in October 2018 due to concerns about the project's governance stemming from cracks discovered in the structure of the Salesforce Transit Center. Several San Francisco city departments reviewed the project's governance structure and project delivery methods with the aid of an expert panel, culminating in a report published in October 2019. The report concluded that the governance of the project should shift from the TJPA to a new agency and that the project should be newly pitched to the public as a project of regional importance due to its role as a link in a future regional rail network.

As of January 2023, the project's price tag had risen to $6.7 billion and its estimated completion date had slipped to 2032, while a planned pedestrian tunnel from the TTC to the Market Street subway's Embarcadero Station had been canceled.
