= Ferry Station Post Office Building =

- U.S. National Register of Historic Places
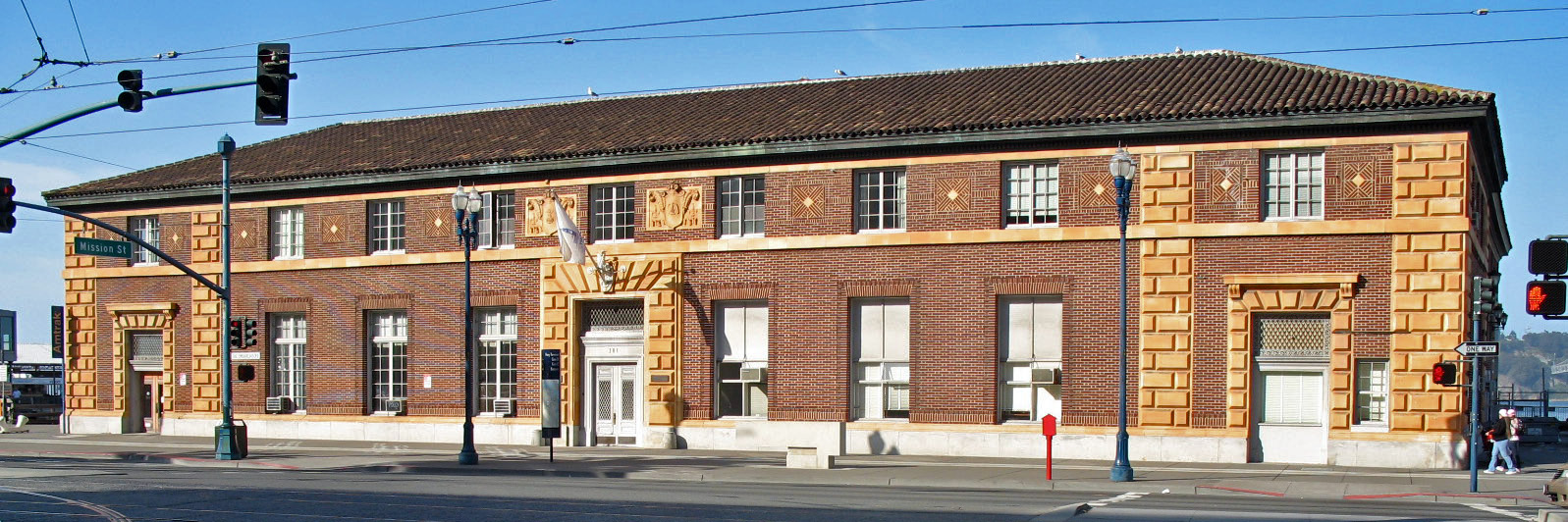
- Ferry Station Post Office in 2008

- Location within San Francisco County Location within California Location within the United States
- Location: 101 The Embarcadero at Mission St., San Francisco, California
- Coordinates: 37°47′39″N 122°23′28″W
- Area: 0.6 acres (0.24 ha)
- Built: 1915
- Architect: A. A. Pyle
- Architectural style: Mediterranean
- NRHP reference No.: 78000756
- Added to NRHP: December 1, 1978

The Ferry Station Post Office Building, also known as the Agriculture Building, is a historic building in San Francisco, California, United States. It was added to the U.S. National Register of Historic Places in 1978.

== Building ==
The building is located on the Embarcadero in the SoMa District, at the foot of Mission Street. Designed by A. A. Pyle of the California Board of State Harbor Commissioners, it is a two-story steel-framed building in Mediterranean Revival style reminiscent of a palazzo, of brick with trompe-l'œil stone trim of terracotta. It has a reinforced concrete foundation resting on a wharf built at the same time and supported on wood pilings. An arch over the double entrance doors has a phoenix and a flagpole in the center. The upper story is decorated with two terracotta shields and with patterned brick panels.

== History ==
It was constructed in 1915 as the main post office for San Francisco, with mail arriving by water and then being distributed by streetcar. Construction cost $31,981.50; the contract was signed on October 22, 1914, and it was completed on May 6, 1915. It was enlarged at the rear in 1918. In 1925 it ceased to be a post office and was used for transportation company offices; in 1933 it was transferred to the state Agriculture Department. It was Amtrak's San Francisco terminal, with buses connecting to trains at Oakland and Emeryville, until March 2015, when this moved to the Temporary TransBay Terminal pending completion of the Transbay Transit Center.

The Ferry Station Post Office Building was added to the National Register of Historic Places on December 1, 1978.
