= List of Golden Gate Transit routes =

Golden Gate Transit (GGT) operates 9 bus routes, including four Regional routes and five Commute routes. Route information listed below is current as of September 13, 2026.

== Regional service ==
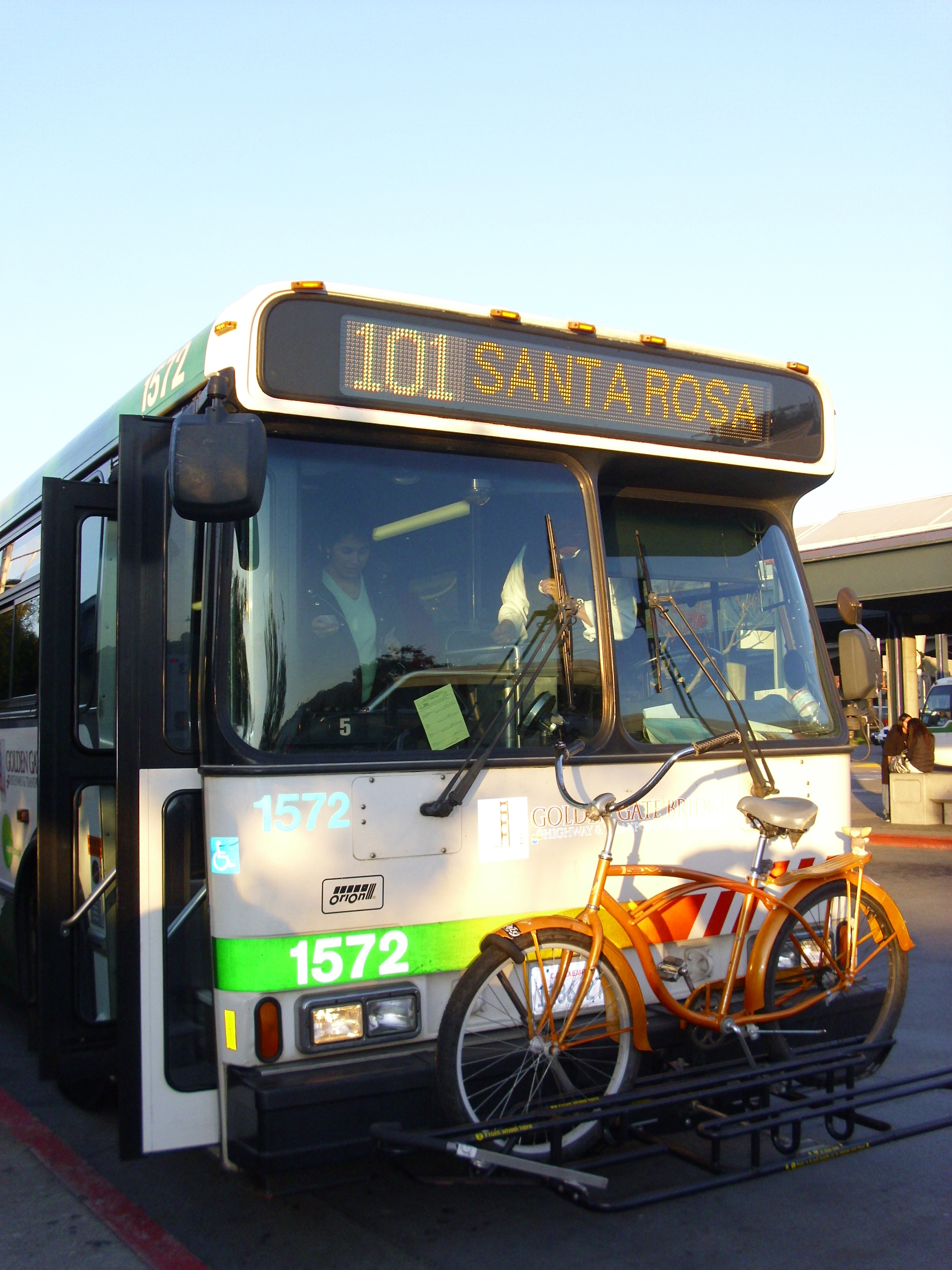
A bus on Route 101 in San Rafael.

Golden Gate Transit operates four Regional bus routes, which primarily provide daily service between San Francisco, Marin, and Contra Costa Counties.

Serving San Francisco via Civic Center

Route Number	Final Destination	Cities, Communities and Locations Served
101	Novato (Golden Gate Place)	San Rafael Transit Center; In San Francisco: Golden Gate Bridge, Marina District, Civic Center, Financial District, Salesforce Transit Center
120	Strawberry Village (Reed & Belvedere)	Mill Valley, Marin City, Sausalito Ferry Terminal; In San Francisco: Golden Gate Bridge, Marina District, Civic Center, Financial District, Salesforce Transit Center

Serving the East Bay

Route Number	Origin	Cities and Communities Served
580	El Cerrito del Norte BART	San Rafael Transit Center, Point Richmond, Richmond, El Cerrito
580X (Westbound only)	El Cerrito del Norte BART	San Rafael Transit Center, Richmond, El Cerrito

== Commute service ==
GGT operates five Commute bus routes, which operate during weekday peak periods only.

Serving San Francisco via Fisherman's Wharf

Route Number	Origin/Destination	Cities, Communities and Locations Served
114	Mill Valley (E. Blitherdale & Kipling/Tower)	Marin City, Sausalito; In San Francisco: Golden Gate Bridge, Marina District, Fisherman's Wharf, Financial District, Salesforce Transit Center, South of Market
132	San Anselmo (San Anselmo Hub)	San Rafael, San Rafael Transit Center, Larkspur, Corte Madera, Mill Valley, Sausalito; In San Francisco: Golden Gate Bridge, Marina District, Fisherman's Wharf, Financial District, Salesforce Transit Center, South of Market
154	Novato (Golden Gate Place)	Novato, Ignacio, Marinwood, Terra Linda; In San Francisco: Golden Gate Bridge, Marina District, Fisherman's Wharf, Financial District, Salesforce Transit Center, South of Market
172	Santa Rosa (Piner & Industrial)	Santa Rosa, Rohnert Park, Petaluma; In San Francisco: Golden Gate Bridge, Marina District, Fisherman's Wharf, Financial District, Salesforce Transit Center, South of Market
172X	Santa Rosa (Piner & Industrial)	Santa Rosa, Rohnert Park; In San Francisco: Golden Gate Bridge, Marina District, Fisherman's Wharf, Financial District, Salesforce Transit Center, South of Market

== Early Bird Express service ==
GGT operates one Early Bird Express route under contract with BART. EBX bus service was initiated to replace early-morning train service during seismic retrofitting of the Transbay Tube, but service has continued since project completion.

Route 704 runs westbound only from El Cerrito del Norte Station to Salesforce Transit Center.

Route 705, which was discontinued in January 2024, ran westbound only from MacArthur Station to Salesforce Transit Center with stops at 19th Street/Oakland Station and at West Grand Avenue and Adeline Street in West Oakland.

== Marin Transit service ==
GGT operates local service within Marin County on five routes under contract with Marin Transit. See Marin Transit for information on Routes 17, 22, 23, 35, and 36.

== Discontinued service ==
GGT has operated several different bus routes over the years that have been discontinued or significantly altered.

Route	Route Type	Areas Served	Notes
3	Shuttle	Tam Valley, Sausalito, Sausalito Ferry Terminal	Replaced by extension of select trips on Route 10 in 2003
5	Shuttle	Mill Valley, Strawberry, Sausalito, Sausalito Ferry Terminal	Discontinued in 2003
9	Shuttle	Strawberry, Tiburon, Belvedere, Tiburon Ferry Terminal	Discontinued in 2009; Current Marin Transit Route 219F operates similar alignment
10	Basic	Strawberry, Mill Valley, Tam Valley, Marin City, Sausalito, San Francisco Civic Center	Replaced by Route 30 (between Marin City and San Francisco) in June 2016
11	Shuttle	Tiburon, Tiburon Ferry Terminal	Replaced by extension of Route 9 in 2003
13	Shuttle	Corte Madera, Larkspur Ferry Terminal	Discontinued in 2003
15	Shuttle	College of Marin, Larkspur, Corte Madera, Larkspur Ferry Terminal	Discontinued in 2003
16	Shuttle	Greenbrae, Larkspur Ferry Terminal	Discontinued in 2001
19	Shuttle	Manor, Fairfax, San Anselmo, Ross, College of Marin, Kentfield, Greenbrae, Larkspur Ferry Terminal	Discontinued in 2003; Current Route 25 operates same alignment
20	Basic	Canal, San Rafael, San Anselmo, Ross, Larkspur, Corte Madera, Marin City, San Francisco Civic Center	Discontinued in 2003; Canal alignment replaced by Marin Transit Route 35; San Rafael to Marin City alignment replaced by Marin Transit Route 22
25	Shuttle	Sleepy Hollow, San Anselmo, San Rafael, Larkspur Ferry Terminal	Discontinued in 2003; Current Route 31 operates same alignment from Miracle Mile to Larkspur Ferry Terminal; Number reused in 2013.
26	Commute	Sleepy Hollow, San Anselmo, San Rafael, San Francisco Financial District	Replaced by extension of Route 27 in 2010
28	Commute	San Rafael, Canal, Larkspur Landing, San Francisco Financial District	Discontinued in 2003
29	Shuttle	San Rafael, Larkspur Ferry Terminal	Discontinued in 2003; Current Route 31 operates same alignment; Number reused by Marin Transit.
30	Basic	San Rafael, Larkspur Ferry Terminal, Manzanita Park & Ride, San Francisco Financial District	Discontinued in 2003; Most of alignment replaced by Route 60; Number reused in 2016.
31	Shuttle	Miracle Mile, San Rafael, Larkspur Ferry Terminal	Discontinued in June 2016; Number reused from 2017 until when SMART extended to Larkspur Terminal.
32	Commute	Peacock Gap, San Rafael, San Francisco Financial District	Discontinued in 2005
34	Commute	Santa Venetia, San Rafael, San Francisco Financial District	Discontinued in 2005
37	Shuttle	Smith Ranch Park & Ride, Terra Linda, Larkspur Ferry Terminal	Discontinued in June 2016
41 (first use)	Shuttle	Lucas Valley, Marinwood, Larkspur Ferry Terminal	Discontinued in 2003
41 (second use)	Shuttle	Smith Ranch Park & Ride, Larkspur Ferry Terminal	Discontinued in 2019
42	Basic	San Rafael, Point Richmond, Richmond, El Cerrito	Discontinued in 2015
48	Commute	Novato, Ignacio, San Francisco Financial District	Replaced by Route 58 in 2003
50	Basic	Novato, San Marin, Ignacio, San Rafael, Marin City, Sausalito, San Francisco Civic Center	Discontinued in 2003; Novato to Sausalito alignment replaced by multiple Marin Transit routes; Sausalito to San Francisco alignment replaced by Route 10
51	Shuttle	Novato, San Marin, Ignacio, Larkspur Ferry Terminal	Discontinued in 2003
60	Commute	San Rafael, Manzanita Park & Ride, Marin City, Sausalito, San Francisco Financial District	Discontinued in 2009; Morning service was replaced by additional service on Routes 4 and 27
67	Shuttle	San Francisco Civic Center, San Francisco Ferry Building	Discontinued in 2003
69	Shuttle	San Francisco Financial District, San Francisco Ferry Building	Discontinued in 2003
71	Commute	Santa Rosa, Rohnert Park, Cotati, Petaluma, Novato, Bel Marin Keys, Larkspur Landing, San Quentin, San Rafael	Discontinued in 2003; Number reused by Marin Transit.
73	Commute	Santa Rosa, Rohnert Park, Petaluma, San Francisco Civic Center	Replaced by Route 101X in 2010
75	Commute	Santa Rosa, Rohnert Park, Cotati, Petaluma, Novato, San Rafael	Discontinued in 2010; Sonoma–Marin Area Rail Transit has similar alignment
78	Commute	Santa Rosa, Sebastopol, Cotati, San Francisco Financial District	Discontinued in 2003
80	Basic	Santa Rosa, Rohnert Park, Cotati, Petaluma, Novato, San Rafael, Marin City, San Francisco Civic Center	Replaced by Route 101 in 2014
90	Basic	Sonoma Valley, Sonoma, Novato, San Rafael, San Francisco Financial District, San Francisco Civic Center	Discontinued in 2003; Sonoma Valley to San Rafael alignment replaced by Sonoma County Transit Route 38
91	Shuttle	San Francisco South of Market	Discontinued in 2014
93	Shuttle	San Francisco Civic Center	Replaced by Routes 4C, 24C, and 54C in September 2018.
97	Commute	Larkspur, Ferry Terminal	Replaced by Route 24X in 2018.
130	Basic	San Rafael, Larkspur, Corte Madera, Mill Valley, Marin City, Sausalito, Marina District, San Francisco Financial District, San Francisco Civic Center	Discontinued in 2026
150	Basic	San Rafael, Larkspur, Corte Madera, Mill Valley, Manzanita Park & Ride, Marin City, Sausalito, Marina District, San Francisco Financial District, San Francisco Civic Center	Discontinued in 2026
164	Commute	Petaluma, Marina District, Fisherman's Wharf, Financial District, South of Market	Discontinued in 2026
580 (first use)	Commute	Emeryville, Berkeley, Albany, San Rafael	Discontinued in 2016
