= Julie Chang (artist) =

American painter and printmaker

Julie Chang is a San Francisco based contemporary artist who works primarily with painting and print making. Her work is influenced by textile design and patterns from various European and Asian cultures as well as pop cultural references. Ideas of identity and belonging are thematic throughout Chang's work.

Chang is among five artists chosen to design public art projects for the San Francisco Transbay Transit Authority in conjunction with the San Francisco Arts Commission. The other four artists are James Carpenter, Tim Hawkinson, Jenny Holzer, and Ned Kahn.

== Education ==
- MFA: Stanford University, CA, 2007
- Graduate studies in painting, new genres, San Francisco Art Institute, CA, 2003–2005
- BFA: School of the Museum of Fine Arts, Painting, and Printmaking, Boston, MA, 1999
- BA: Tufts University, MA, 1999
- Painting, Illustration, and Commercial Design, Parsons School of Design, Paris, France, 1998

== Career ==
Chang's work employs a visual syntax drawn from diverse––and sometimes oppositional––sources, varying from wallpapers and genetic mutations to weaving and systems theory. Through this visual syntax, Chang's work explores the construction and (mis)understandings of personal and public identity to spark discussions about "race, class, gender, and cultural commodification." Her work has been exhibited at the San Jose Museum of Art, the San Francisco Art Institute, and other notable locations. Chang has also been commissioned for public projects, such as designing the Grand Hall terrazzo floor of San Francisco's Salesforce Transit Center. She is currently represented by Hosfelt Gallery in San Francisco.

== Awards ==
- 2007: MFA Studio Award, Headlands Center for the Arts, Sausalito, CA
- 2004: Murphy Fine Arts Fellowship, San Francisco Arts Commission, San Francisco, CA
- 2003: Merit Scholarship, San Francisco Art Institute, CA
- 2004: Educator's Incentive Grant, San Francisco Archdiocese, San Francisco, CA
