= Salesforce Transit Center =

Transit center in San Francisco, California, US

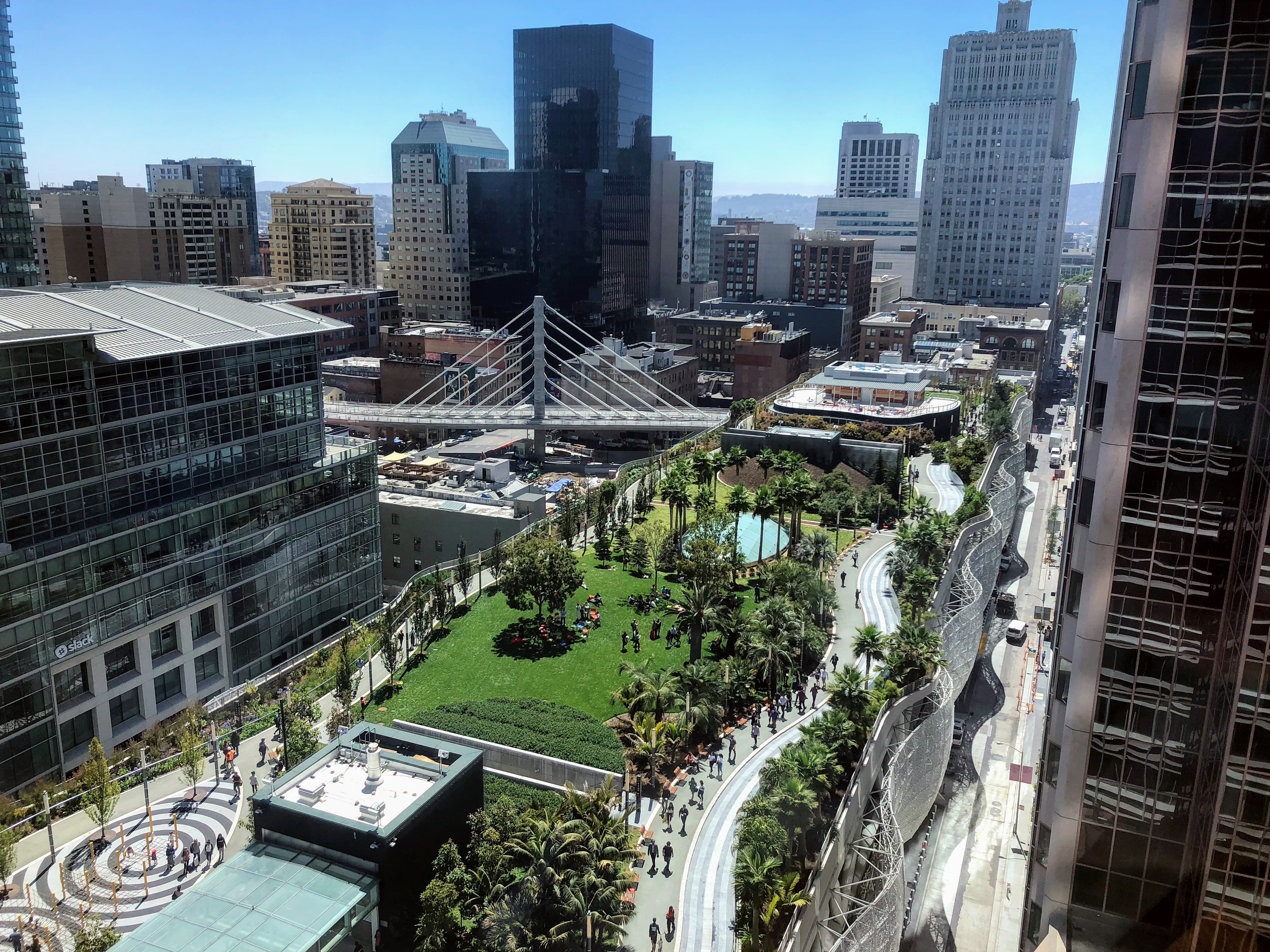
- The transit center, rooftop park, and bus bridge seen from Salesforce Tower

General information
- Other names: Transbay Transit Center
- Location: 425 Mission Street; San Francisco, California
- Coordinates: 37.7897°N 122.3966°W
- Owner: Transbay Joint Powers Authority
- Platforms: 5 side platforms (ground level bus plaza); 1 island platform (bus deck)
- Bus operators: AC Transit, Greyhound, Golden Gate Transit, Muni, WestCAT Lynx

Construction
- Cycle facilities: Yes
- Accessible: Yes
- Architect: Pelli Clarke Pelli, Adamson Associates, Inc. (as executive architect)

Other information
- Website: salesforcetransitcenter.com

History
- Opened: August 12, 2018; July 13, 2019 (reopening)
- Closed: September 25, 2018 (temporary)
Proposed rail service
Preceding station	Caltrain	Following station
Terminus	Local	4th and King toward San Jose Diridon or Tamien
Terminus	Limited	4th and King toward San Jose Diridon
Terminus	Express	4th and King toward San Jose Diridon
Terminus	Weekend Local	4th and King toward San Jose Diridon or Tamien
Preceding station	California High-Speed Rail	Following station
Terminus	Phase 1 Future	San Francisco (4th and King) toward Merced or Anaheim
Location

The Salesforce Transit Center, also known as the Transbay Transit Center, is a transit center in downtown San Francisco. It serves as the primary bus terminal for the San Francisco Bay Area, and is proposed as a possible future rail terminal. The centerpiece of the San Francisco Transbay development, the construction is governed by the Transbay Joint Powers Authority (TJPA). The 1,430-foot-long (440 m) building sits one block south-east of Market Street, a primary commercial and transportation artery.

After the 1989 Loma Prieta earthquake damaged the 1939 Transbay Terminal, voters approved funds for the new Transbay Transit Center in 1999. Construction on the first phase, the bus terminal, began in 2010. Limited Muni bus service began in December 2017, and full service from AC Transit and other regional and intercity bus operators began in August 2018. Full funding has not yet been secured for the second phase of construction, the Downtown Rail Extension (now known as The Portal), which hopes to add an underground terminal station for Caltrain and California High-Speed Rail.

The transit center was closed for repairs in September 2018 after cracks were found in structural beams; services resumed in July and August 2019.

== Design ==
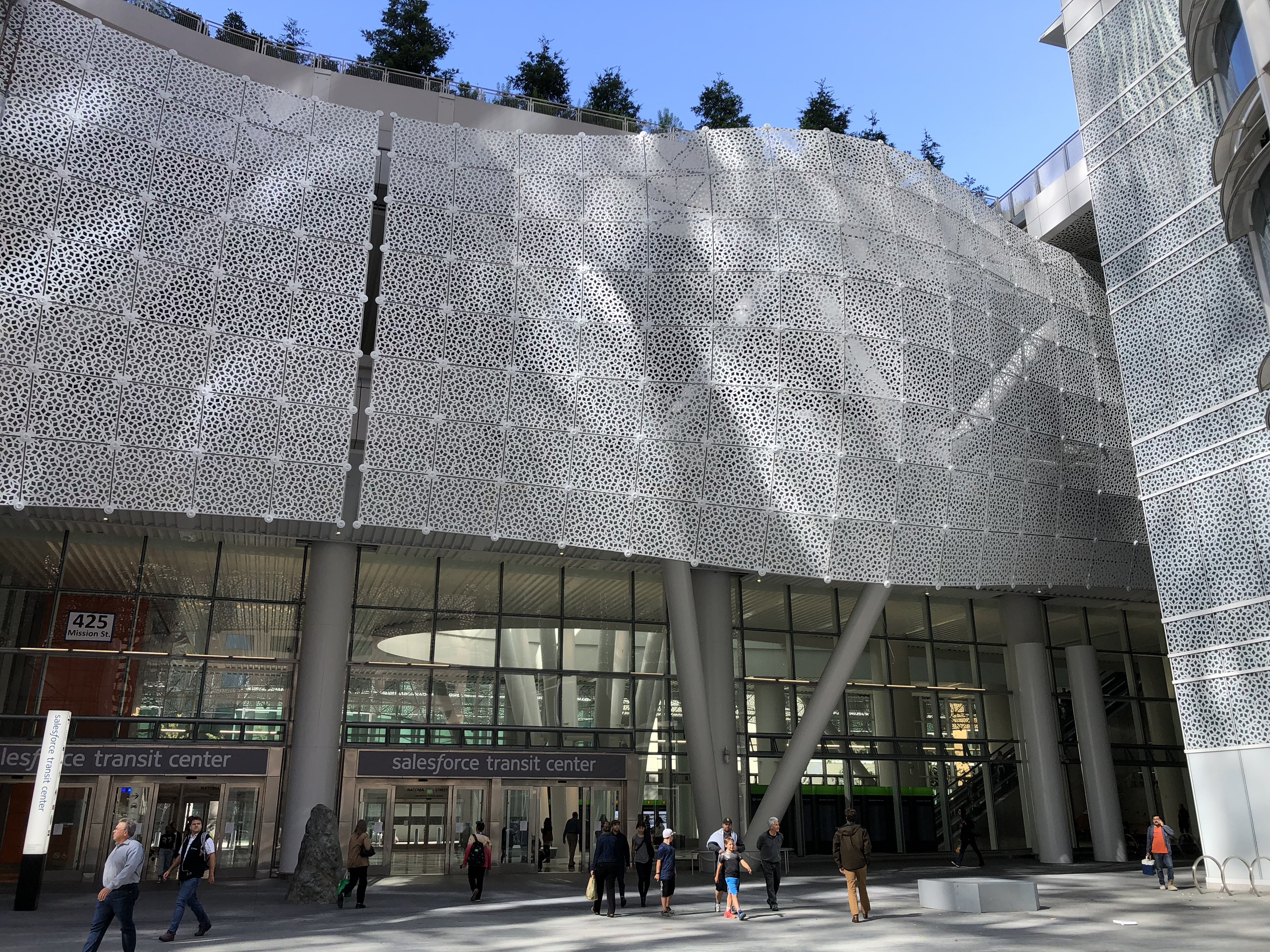
The main entrance to the Grand Hall, located at Mission and Fremont Streets. The outer "skin", made of white aluminum, is perforated in the pattern of a Penrose tiling.

Designed by Pelli Clarke Pelli Architects (PCPA), the Salesforce Transit Center is about 1,430 feet (440 m) long and 165 feet (50 m) wide. It occupies the entire block between Minna and Natoma Streets (just southeast of Mission Street), and stretches from Beale Street to 140 feet (43 m) east of 2nd Street. The first phase of the project includes the aboveground structure plus a belowground shell for the second phase. The structure has four levels: the ground floor with entrances, retail space, ticketing, and Muni/Golden Gate Transit boarding platforms; the second floor with retail space, food hall, offices, and Greyhound ticket counter and waiting room; the bus deck with bus bays surrounding a central waiting area; and the 5.4-acre (2.2 ha) rooftop park.

The bus deck has a dedicated highway ramp (consisting, in part, of a cable-stayed bridge) to the San Francisco–Oakland Bay Bridge and an off-site bus storage facility under the western Bay Bridge approach. In order to allow buses with doors on the right to serve the central (island) platform on the bus deck, buses circulate clockwise (i.e., driving on the left) while inside the terminal. The bus bridge includes a traffic light to facilitate the transition between right-hand traffic (outside the transit center) and left-hand traffic (inside the transit center).

The rooftop park, designed by PWP Landscape Architecture, includes an amphitheater, a restaurant, and water features. The inclusion of the park was part of the winning bid in the architectural design composition for the structure.

The building includes a free, 20-passenger aerial tram to provide access from street level (at Mission Street and Fremont Street) to the rooftop park. Described as a "whimsical gondola" by the building's architects, it was the second passenger-carrying aerial tram to operate in San Francisco, after the one formerly located at the Cliff House (operational 1955–1965). According to the San Francisco Chronicle, it is "frequently out of order", but the park level is also accessible by stairs, escalators and elevator.

The second phase of the project, constructed as part of the Downtown Rail Extension (now known as The Portal), will add a two-level underground train station to be served by Caltrain and California High-Speed Rail. The platform area will have three island platforms serving six tracks. A mezzanine with ticketing and waiting areas will be located above the platform and below the ground-level entrances. A pedestrian tunnel was planned to be constructed below Beale Street to Embarcadero station, connecting the Transbay Transit Center with BART and Muni Metro. This was later scrapped as a cost-saving measure. The proposed second Transbay Tube, which may be used by Caltrain, CAHSR, and/or BART, may also connect to the Transit Center. This extension would cost as much as $6 billion on top of the $2 billion already spent, and is currently unfunded.

The aerial tram connecting the ground-level plaza to the rooftop park. At the time of this video, the tram was undergoing testing before opening to the public.

=== Public art ===
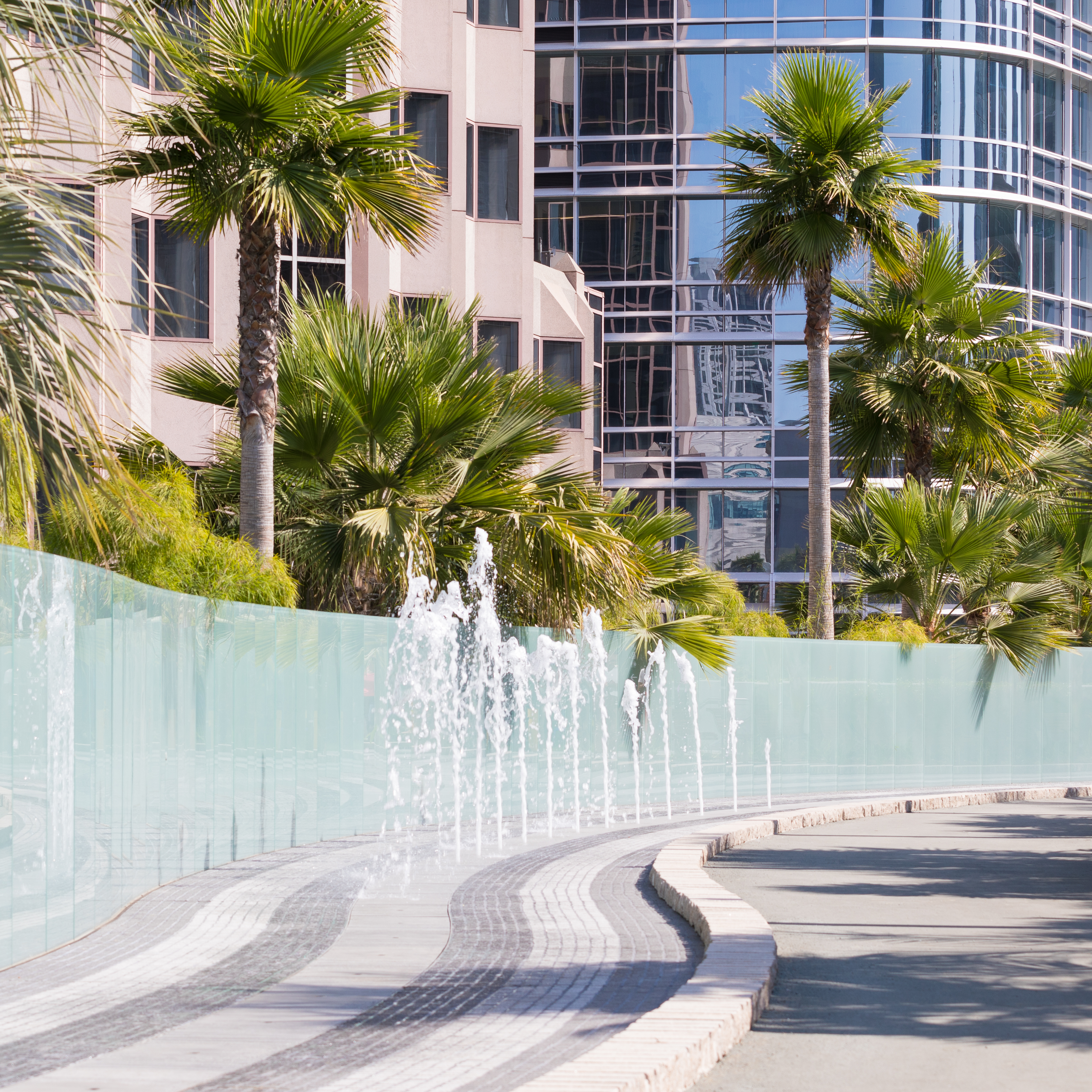
Ned Kahn's Bus Jet Fountain: Water jets in the rooftop park respond to the flow of buses on the deck below.

Based on the policies established by the FTA encouraging the inclusion of public art in transportation facilities, the TJPA committed $4.75 million to fund the creation of public artwork for the Program. Working with the San Francisco Arts Commission, the TJPA oversees the planning and development of the public art program. Initially there were five artists included in the program: James Carpenter, Julie Chang, Tim Hawkinson, Jenny Holzer and Ned Kahn. In June 2017, SFAC and TJPA announced the planned Hawkinson installation would be cancelled as "the nature of the materials, the sculpture's size, and its location" made it "a particularly complex engineering task."

- James Carpenter's installation, titled Parallel Light Fields, consists of illuminated ceiling segments and benches along Shaw Alley, a pedestrian/retail corridor at ground level beneath the Transit Center.
- Julie Chang's installation, titled The Secret Garden, is the decorated terrazzo floor of the Grand Hall in the Transit Center.
- Jenny Holzer's installation, titled White Light, is a large scrolling LED sign approximately 11 feet (3.4 m) high, displaying text specific to the San Francisco Bay Area. The sign is installed just below the elliptical skylight of the Grand Hall in the Transit Center.
- Ned Kahn's installation, titled Bus Jet Fountain, consists of water jets on the rooftop of the Transit Center. The jets are designed to respond to the flow of buses on the deck below.
- Tim Hawkinson's planned installation was a 41-foot (12 m) high sculpture to serve as a "guardian" for travelers. It was to have been partially constructed from material salvaged from the demolition of the Transbay Terminal, but due to cost and engineering issues, was cancelled.

== History ==
=== Planning ===
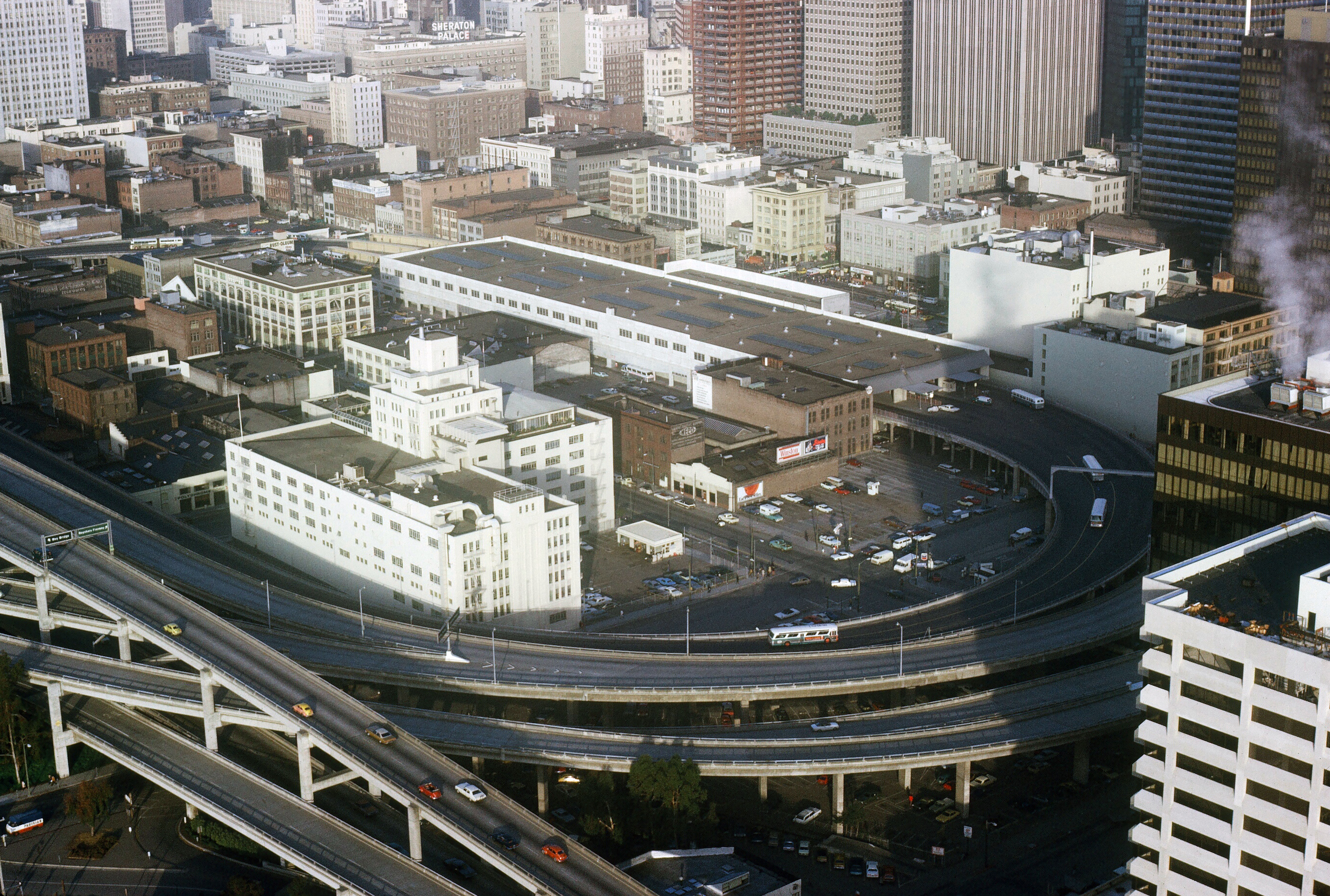
The Transbay Terminal, which the Transbay Transit Center was built to replace

The original Transbay Terminal opened in 1939 to serve Key System and East Bay Electric Lines commuter trains and Sacramento Northern Railway interurban trains operating over the new Bay Bridge. It was converted to a bus terminal in 1958 and began serving AC Transit commuter buses. The structure was damaged in the 1989 Loma Prieta earthquake, necessitating replacement.

In 1995, Caltrain agreed to study extending its commuter rail service from its 4th and King terminus closer to the Financial District, including whether the obsolete Transbay Terminal should be removed, remodeled, or rebuilt. Ultimately, it was decided that the Transbay Terminal should be rebuilt, with the rail extension entering the Terminal under Second Street. In November 1999, San Francisco voters adopted Proposition H declaring that Caltrain shall be extended downtown into a new regional intermodal transit station constructed to replace the former Transbay Terminal. The Transbay Joint Powers Authority (TJPA) was founded in 2001 as the administrative joint powers authority for the project.

The final Environmental Impact Report (EIR) was published in 2004. The project was divided into two phases, with Phase 1 being demolition of the original terminal and construction of the Transbay Transit Center, and Phase 2 being the Downtown Rail Extension (now known as The Portal).

In 2006, developers agreed to a new Mello-Roos tax district in the area surrounding the Transbay Transit Center in order for permits for higher buildings to move forward. San Francisco set the tax rate in 2012 at 0.55 percent of assessed value; due to rising real estate prices, however, the 2014 tax burden had risen by nearly 50% compared to the 2012 tax burden, and the developers threatened to pull their building plans entirely or sue the city. The lawsuits never materialized, however.

On September 20, 2007, the design proposed by César Pelli of Pelli Clarke Pelli Architects was chosen for both the Transit Center and the Transbay Tower, now known as Salesforce Tower.

=== Construction ===
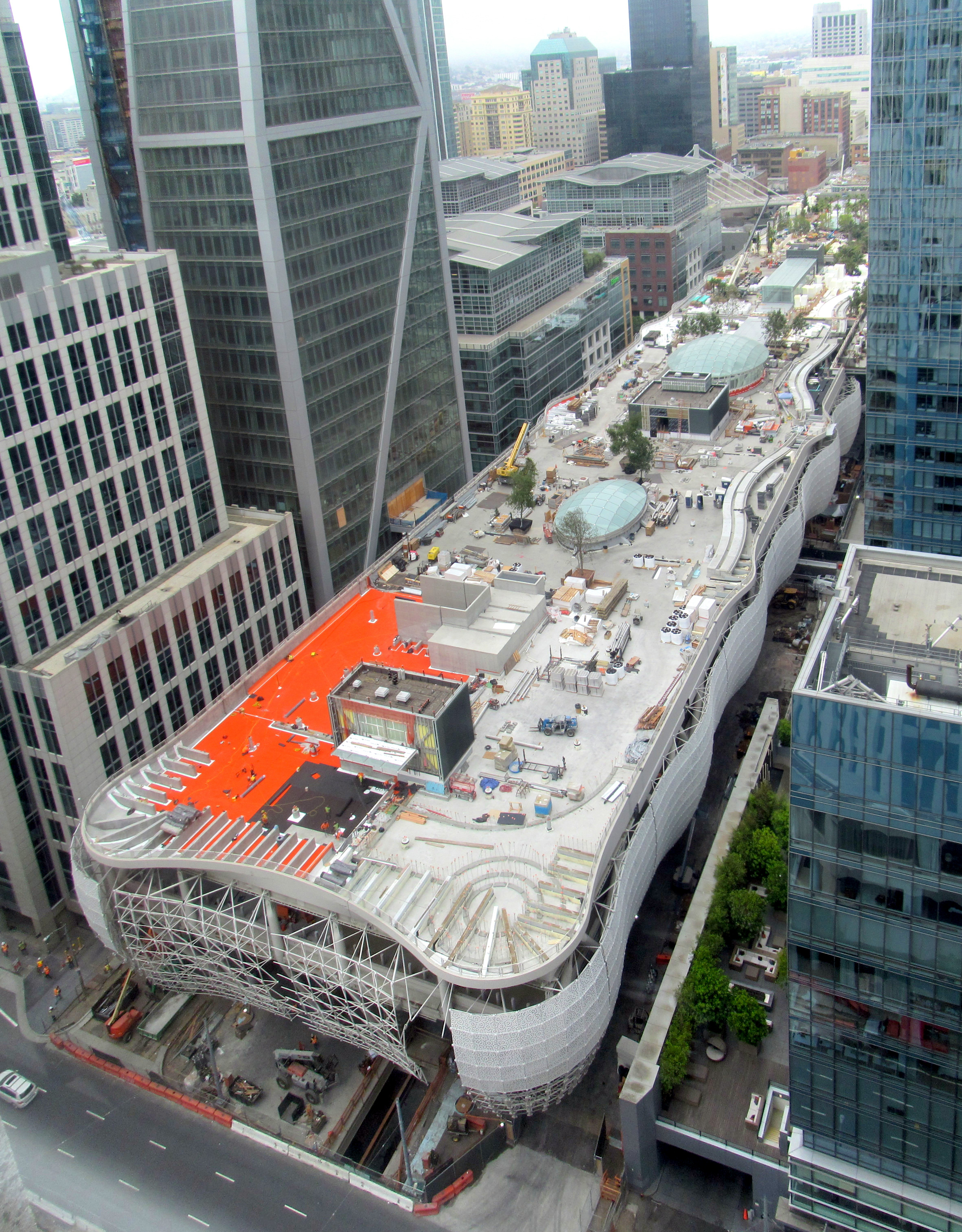
Salesforce Transit Center under construction in August 2017

The first phase of construction consisted of the aboveground bus terminal, including retail spaces and the rooftop park, plus the concrete shell of the underground rail levels. It cost $2.4 billion, of which $500 million was for the underground shell. On August 7, 2010, all bus service was moved to the interim Temporary Transbay Terminal. The $18 million outdoor terminal is located on the block bounded by Folsom, Beale, Howard and Main Streets in the South of Market district, two blocks from the site of the former Transbay Terminal. Ground was broken for the new Transbay Transit Center four days later. Much of the initial construction work was underground, and aboveground evidence of construction did not appear until late 2014. As originally planned, the Transit Center was anticipated to be complete by late 2016, with bus operations expected to commence by August 2017.

Demolition of the former Transbay Terminal and ramps was completed in September 2011. Amtrak Thruway bus service, which connects to Amtrak trains at Emeryville station, moved from the Ferry Station Post Office Building to the Temporary Transbay Terminal on March 2, 2015. Under a naming rights deal announced on July 7, 2017, the transit center was given the official name of Salesforce Transit Center; the adjoined City Park took the official name Salesforce Park.

The first phase of the new Transit Center was originally to be completed by the end of 2017. This was delayed to March 2018 in July 2017, and to June 2018 that December. On December 26, 2017, Muni began operating route 5 buses into the ground level of the terminal in order to meet the federal deadline of some service to the terminal beginning in 2017. On June 16, 2018, Muni began operating all 5, 5R, 7, 38, and 38R buses to the surface level of the terminal.

=== Opening ===
The first phase opened for full bus service on August 12, 2018; the rooftop park opened on the same date. Greyhound and BoltBus service moved from the Temporary Transbay Terminal three days later on August 15, leaving Amtrak Thruway as the sole remaining bus operator using the Temporary Transbay Terminal. Amtrak buses began using a street-level stop at Salesforce Plaza on Mission Street near Fremont Street on October 28, 2019. That stop was temporarily relocated along Mission Street to near 2nd Street on November 9, 2020.

Without the revenue from the 100,000 expected daily rail passengers, the bus-only terminal was expected to lose as much as $20 million annually. Daily AC Transit ridership to/from Transbay Transit Center was 17,436 in February 2020, but just 3,895 in April 2023.

=== Extended closure ===
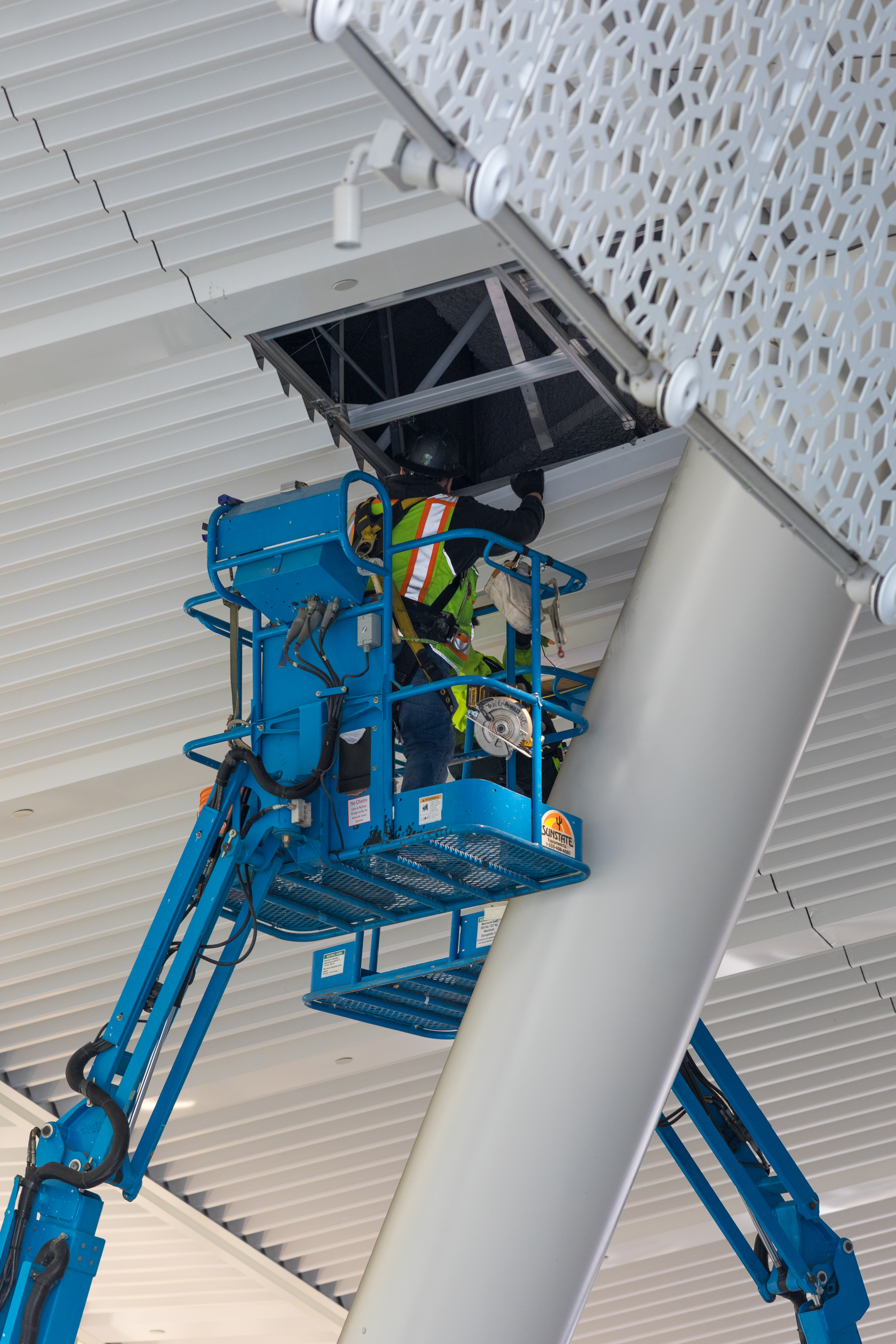
Repairs at the Transbay Transit Center in October 2018

The transit center was abruptly ordered closed on September 25, 2018—six weeks after opening and during Salesforce's annual Dreamforce conference—following the discovery by workers installing the final ceiling panels of a "major crack" in a steel beam supporting the bus deck above Fremont Street. Beale, Fremont, and First Streets were closed beneath and adjacent to the transit center; Beale and First reopened soon after. The Temporary Transbay Terminal, which had been in use during construction of the new transit center, was hastily reopened to serve riders.

The following day, a second, parallel beam was also found to be cracked, causing the transit center and Fremont Street to remain closed at least through the end of the following week. On October 2, 2018, it was reported that the Transit Center would remain closed at least through the end of the month. Fremont Street reopened on October 15.

A Metropolitan Transportation Commission (MTC) peer review panel investigated whether the cracks may have been caused by flaws that developed in the steel during fabrication, plus by stress concentrations arising from weld access holes or weld termination holes cut into the beams, that were added after the shop designs were submitted for approval. Weld access holes have more stringent building code requirements than weld termination holes, and it was not clear which type of holes were added. In February 2019, the TJPA announced that it expected repairs to be completed in June 2019, but cautioned that the center would not reopen until the MTC peer review panel published its final report. In April 2019, it was determined that the cracks were caused when crews welding the beams together skipped a crucial step—mandated by the building code—that led to tiny micro-cracks forming. Multiple inspections failed to notice the skipped step, and those micro-cracks grew into larger ones.

The facility is under warranty for two years "after substantial completion", placing financial responsibility for the issue on contractors, Webcor Builders and Obayashi Corporation, and their subcontractors. The beams were fabricated by Herrick Corporation in Stockton as part of a $189 million contract between Skanska USA Civil West of New York and the TJPA.

The TJPA announced on May 10 that repairs were complete. The rooftop park reopened on July 1, 2019. Muni and Golden Gate Transit buses resumed using the surface bus plaza on July 13, and the full facility reopened on August 11.

=== Other issues and criticism ===
The park has been criticized for allowing a commercial company to own the naming rights, as well as not having enough bike lanes connecting to other major transit routes. Wired criticized the park for its control over access, claiming that there could never be a political demonstration at the park.

In September 2018, just a month after the transit center's opening, the TJPA revealed that the walkway around the rooftop park, made of decomposed granite, had begun to deteriorate much faster than expected. Repairs on the pathway were completed in May 2019, but it is not clear if the costs fall under warranty.

=== New skyscrapers ===
Along with the new transit center, thirteen towers have been built or proposed on adjacent parcels, ranging from 300 feet (91 m) to 1,070 feet (326 m) tall, on land freed by the demolition of the former terminal and bus and freeway ramps. The most prominent of these is the city's new tallest building, Salesforce Tower. Two of the skyscrapers, Salesforce Tower and 181 Fremont, are linked directly to the rooftop park. Salesforce Tower has a dedicated pair of elevators, open to the public and accessible via the rear lobby, which serve as one of the access points to the park.

== Bus services ==
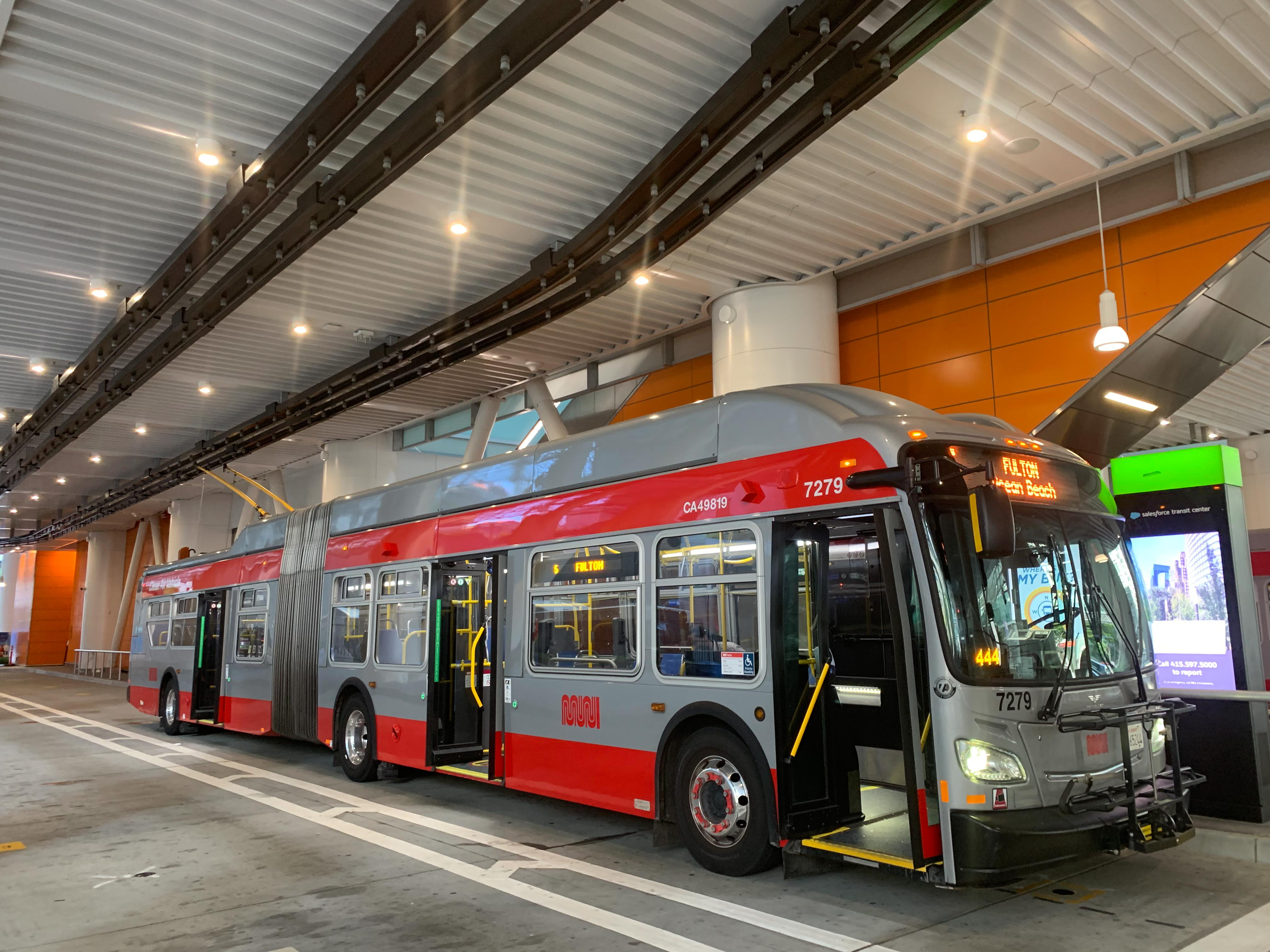
A Muni trolley bus on route 5 at Transbay Transit Center

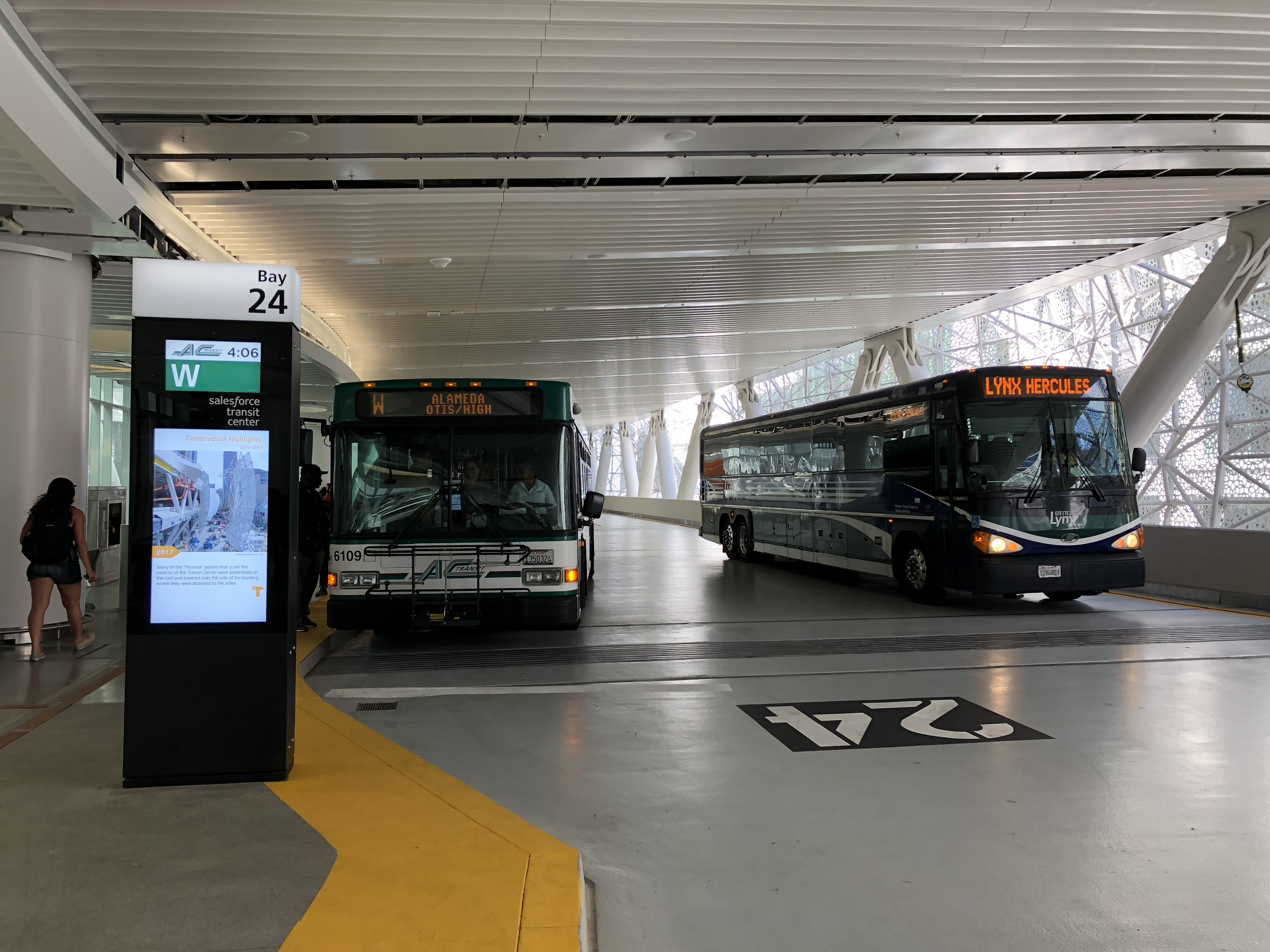
AC Transit (left) and WestCAT buses on the bus deck

The following services use the bus deck:

- AC Transit: E, F, G, J, L, LA, NL, NX1, NX2, O, P, V, W
- Greyhound Lines
- Muni: 25
- SamTrans: EPX, FCX
- WestCAT: LYNX

Several additional services use the street-level transit plaza:

- Muni: 5, 5R, 7, 38, 38R, 714
- Golden Gate Transit: 101, 114, 130, 132, 150, 154, 172

Numerous other transit services converge into downtown San Francisco with stops nearby. These include BART and Muni Metro at Embarcadero station and Montgomery Street station, Golden Gate Transit peak-only routes (with stops on Fremont Street), Muni bus and streetcar routes, SamTrans routes 292 and 397, AC Transit route 800, and the Presidio Go Shuttle. As of January 2020, Amtrak Thruway buses also use a surface stop outside the terminal — despite previous plans to use the bus deck — due to disagreements between the TJPA and other agencies about costs.

== Future rail service ==
The Transbay Transit Center project was designed to include a tunnel (the Downtown Rail Extension, now known as The Portal) extending the terminus of the Caltrain commuter rail line from its current location at Fourth and King Streets; the downtown Caltrain extension is projected to alleviate roadway traffic and Caltrain rider delays, resulting in an estimated $20 million savings per year. The Caltrain extension depends on the electrification of its rolling stock, which was completed in 2024. When this project is completed, Caltrain riders would no longer need to transfer to Muni to reach the downtown financial district. The heavy rail portion of the terminal would be designed to accommodate the planned high speed rail from Los Angeles, which shares the right-of-way (Peninsula Corridor) with Caltrain between San Francisco and San Jose. BART has expressed interest in having their proposed Second Transbay Tube connect to the new terminal and Alameda.

DTX was planned to open for rail service in 2019 at a budgeted cost of US$2,600,000,000 (equivalent to $3,600,000,000 in 2025). The DTX scope also includes moving the existing 4th & King Caltrain station underground. Part of the DTX project also includes building out two below-grade levels below the TTC. One level would serve as the actual train platform, hosting six tracks and three platforms to accommodate Caltrain and HSR service. The other level would be a passenger waiting area, including ticket sales and retail amenities. The waiting area would be connected via tunnel to the BART/Muni Metro Embarcadero Station.

As of May 2024, the extension is projected to cost $8.25 billion and start construction in 2025 with a completion date in 2032. A federal funding pledge covers $3.4 billion of the cost, provided that local officials identify matching funds. The project would include a three-block underground concourse connecting to BART and Muni Metro trains at Embarcadero station.

== Gallery ==
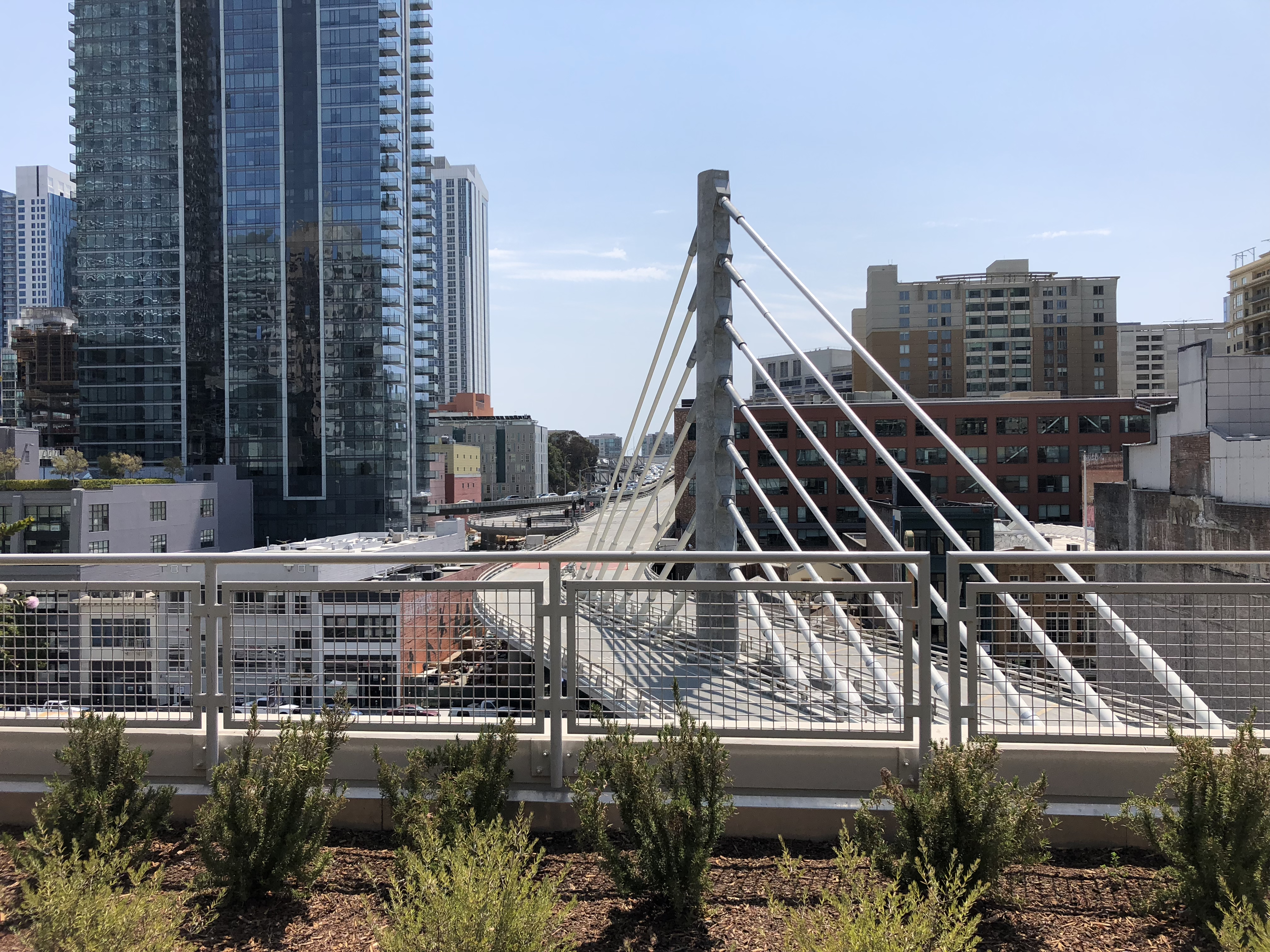
Cable-stayed bus bridge, viewed from the rooftop park

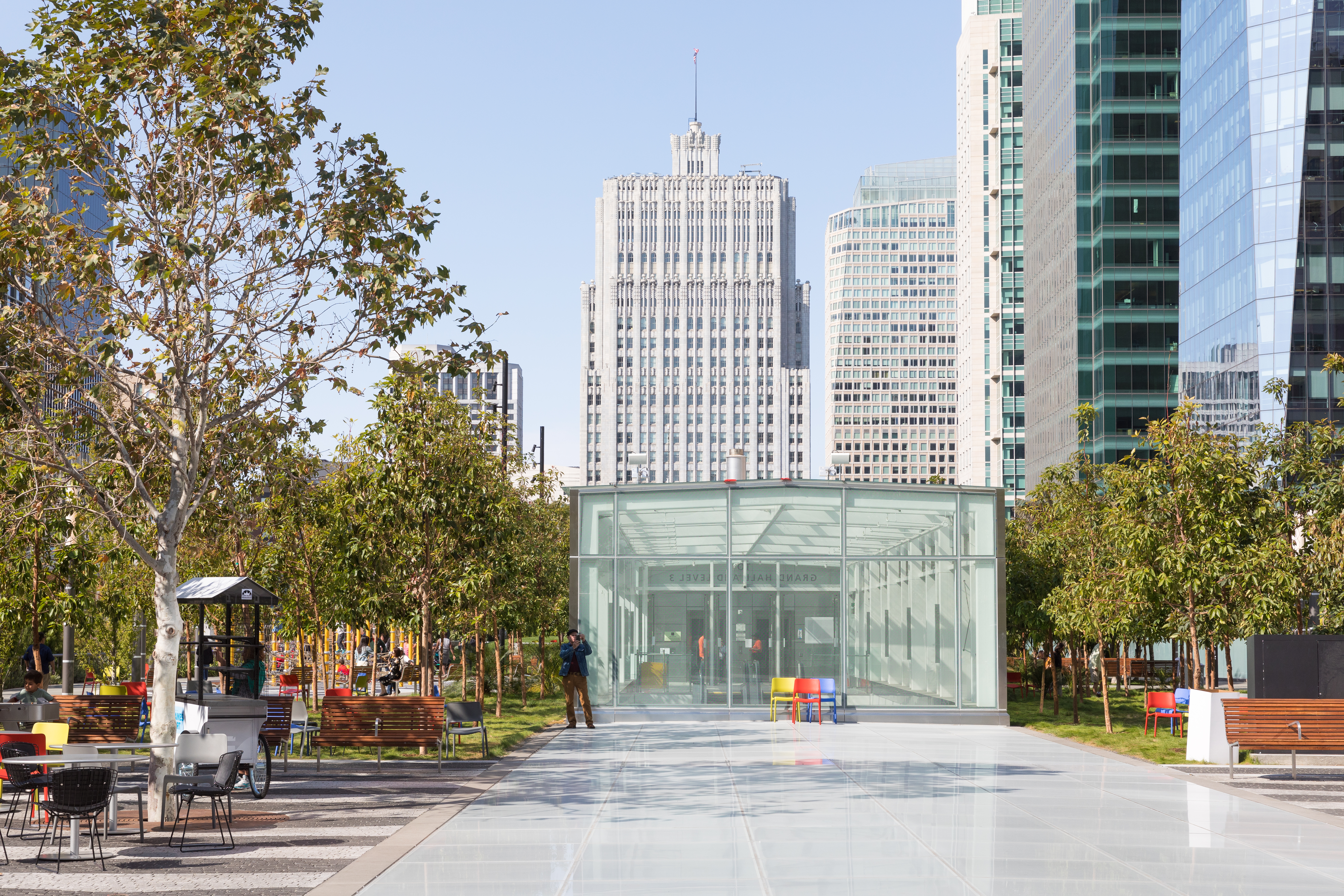
View of Salesforce Park on top of the bus terminal

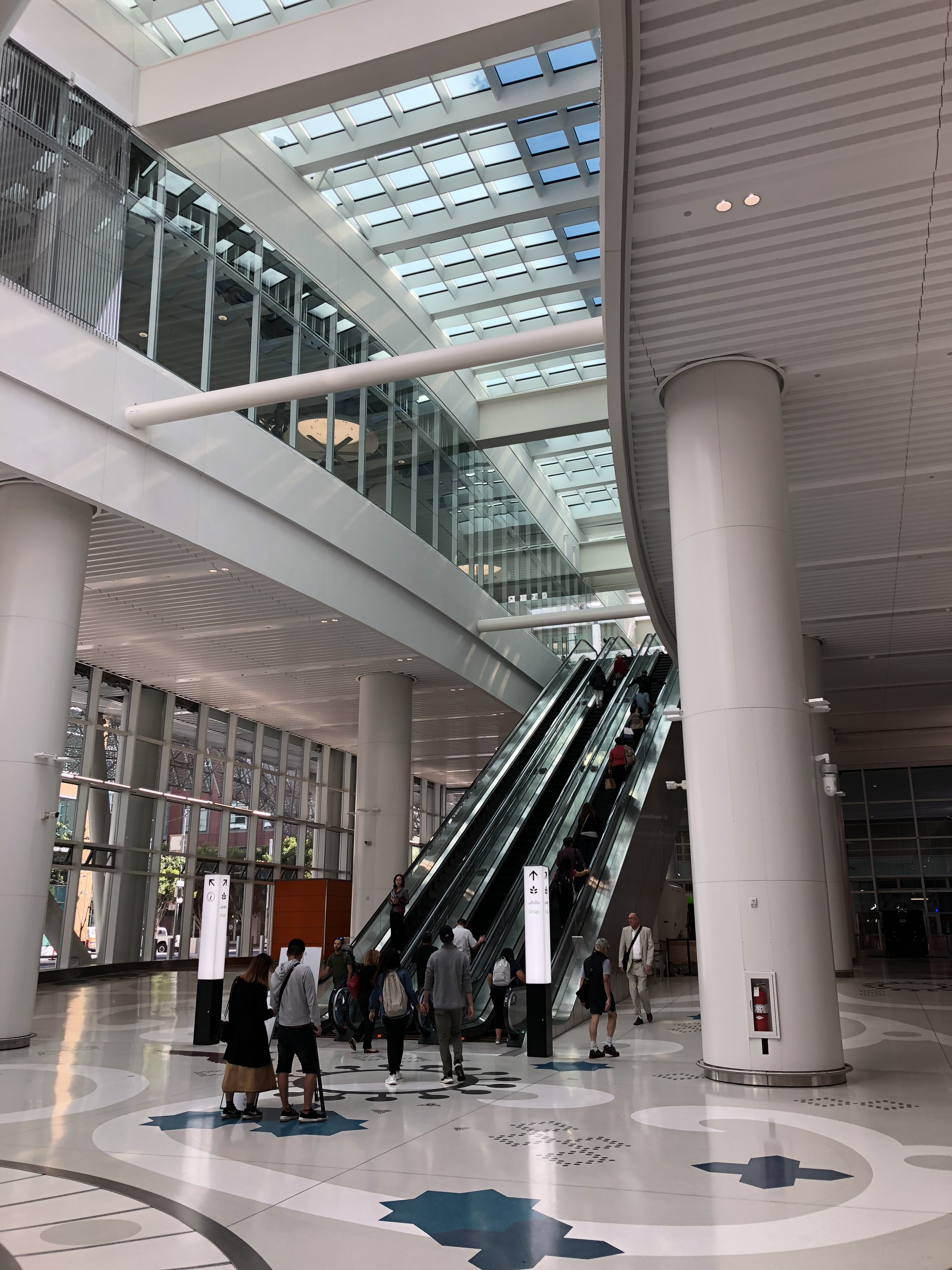
The Grand Hall, with escalators to the 3rd floor bus deck and a portion of Julie Chang's terrazzo floor, titled The Secret Garden

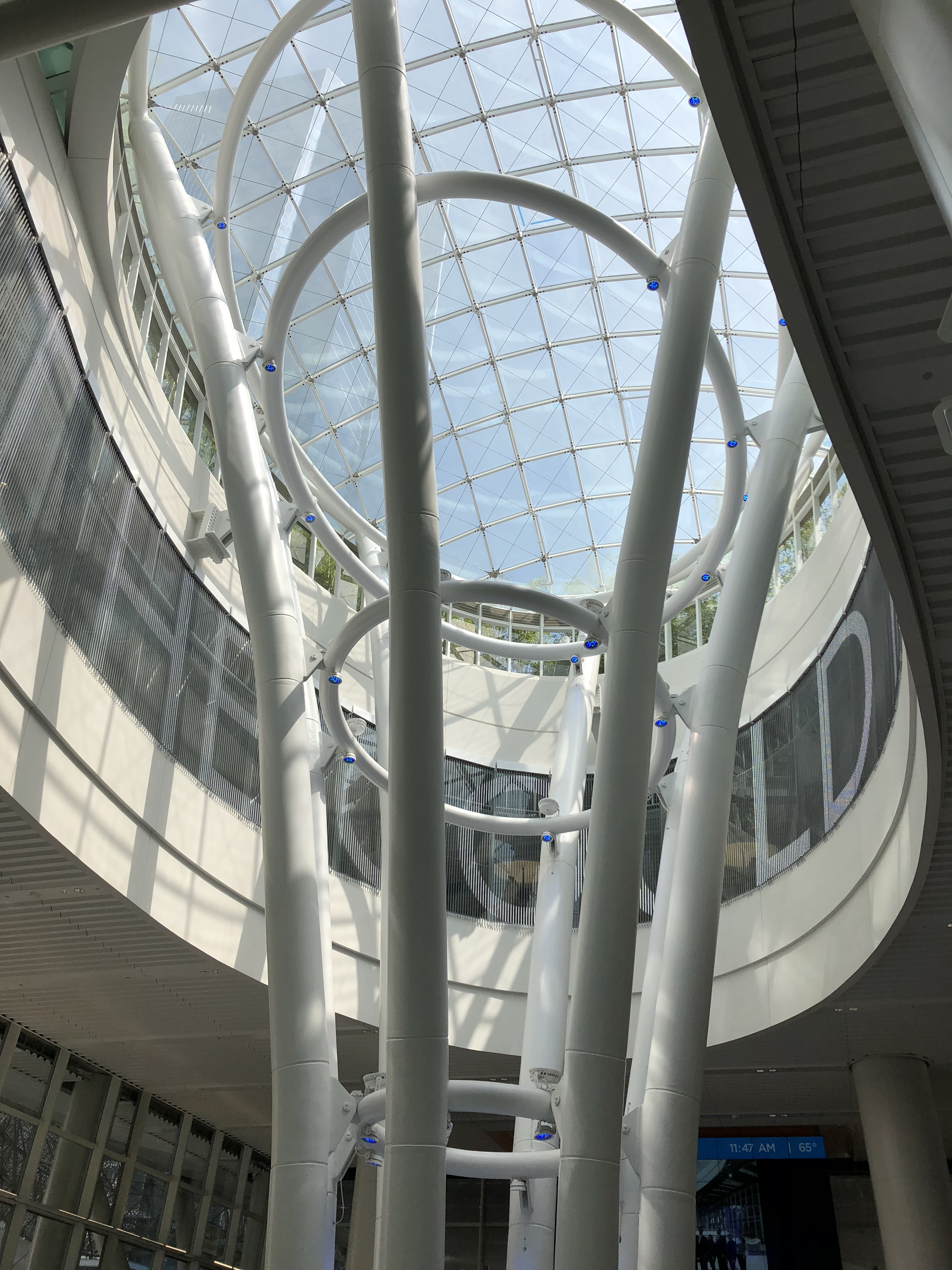
Grand Hall atrium, with Jenny Holzer's work White Light visible behind the central columns

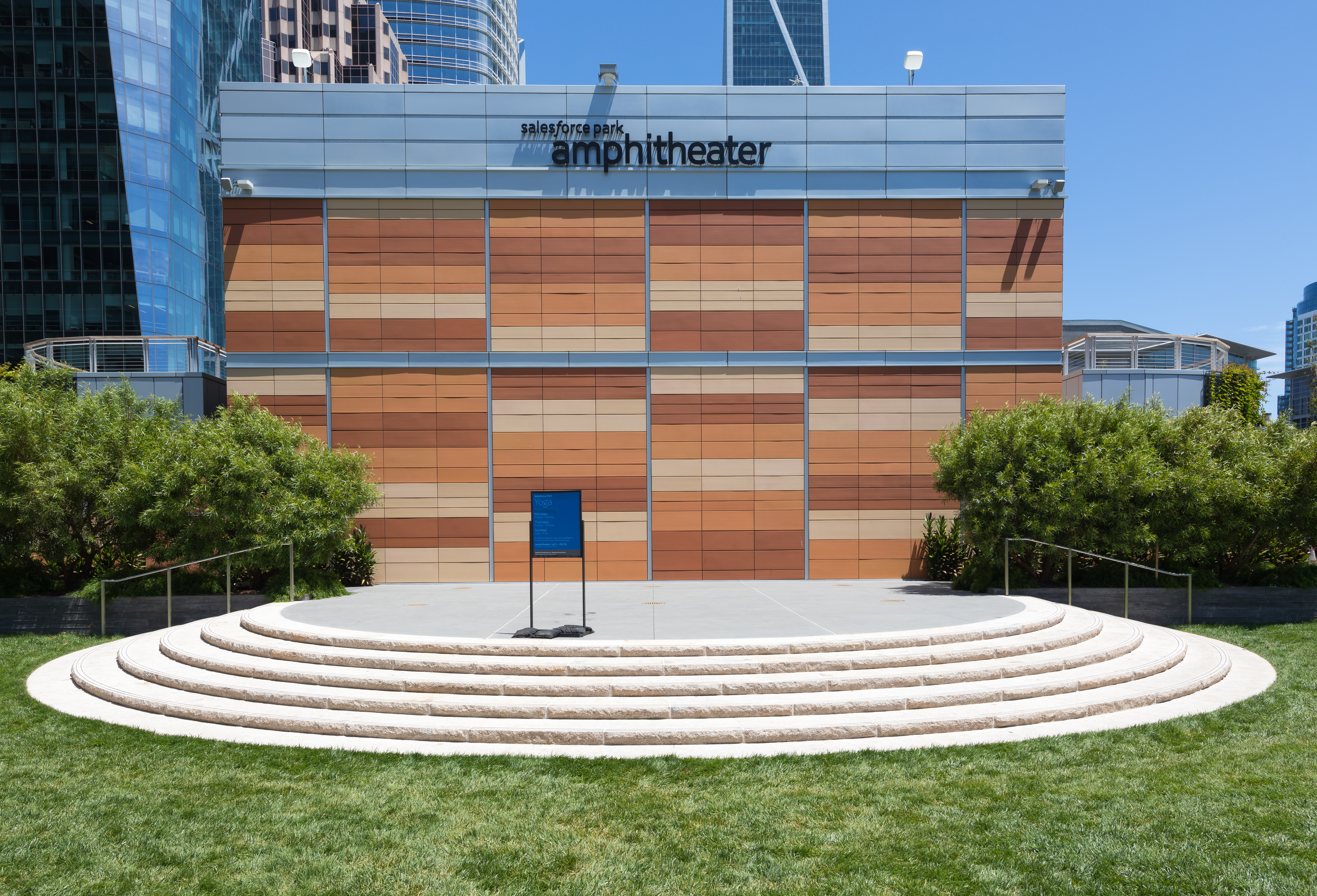
Amphitheater in the rooftop park
