= Lefty O'Doul Bridge =

Bridge in San Francisco

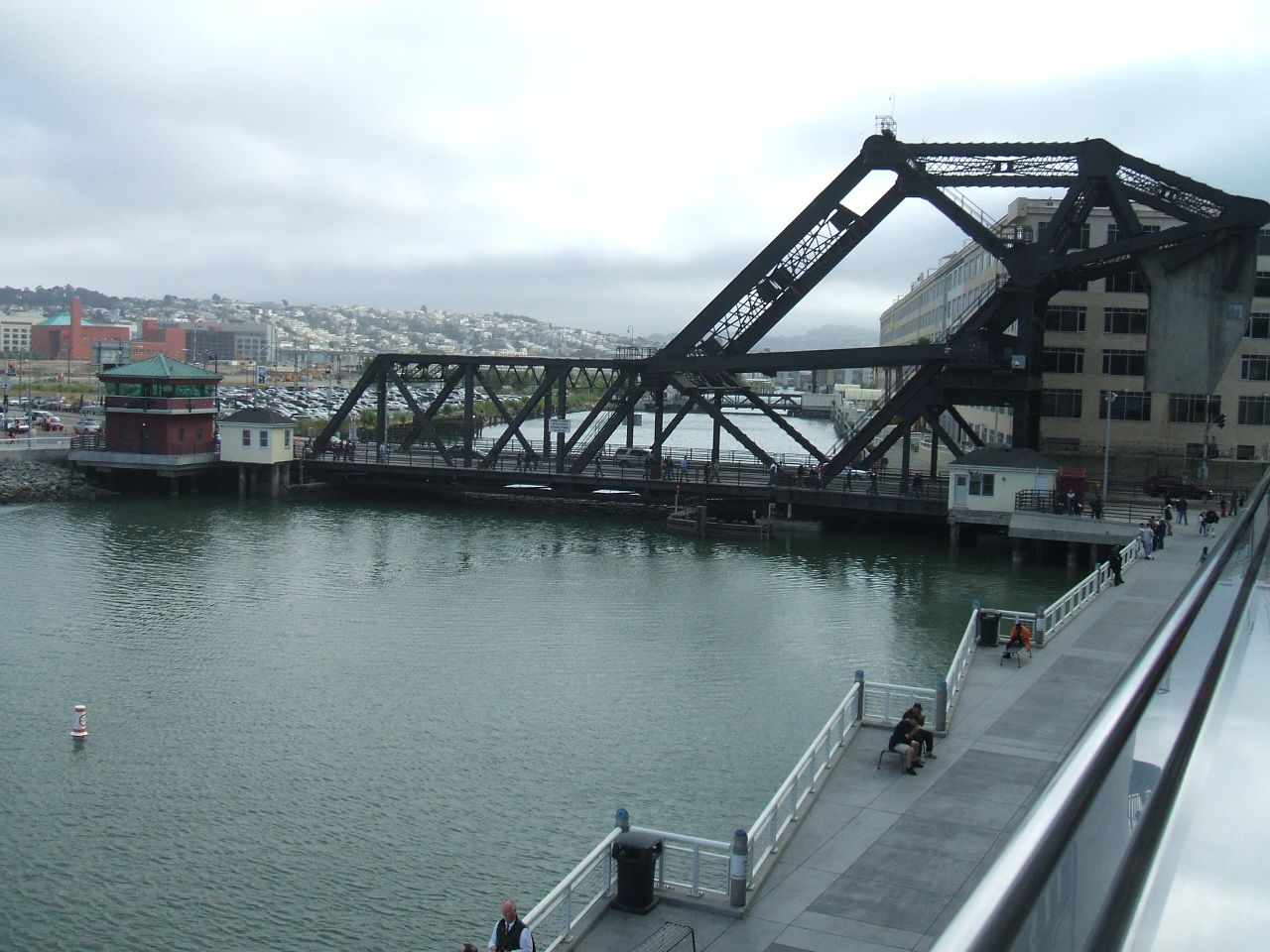
- The bridge as seen from Oracle Park
- Coordinates: 37°46′36″N 122°23′24″W
- Carries: Cars, bicycles, pedestrians
- Crosses: Mission Creek
- Locale: San Francisco, California
- Named for: Lefty O'Doul

Characteristics
- Design: Bascule bridge
- No. of lanes: 5

History
- Designer: Joseph Strauss
- Construction cost: $640,000
- Opened: May 12, 1933

Statistics
- Toll: None

Location
- Interactive map of Lefty O'Doul Bridge

The Lefty O'Doul Bridge (originally the Third Street Bridge and China Basin Bridge) is a bascule bridge connecting the China Basin and Mission Bay neighborhoods of San Francisco, carrying Third Street across the Mission Creek Channel. It is located directly adjacent to Oracle Park.

== History ==
The previous bridge on the site closed to traffic after November 25, 1931. The modern bridge opened on May 12, 1933, at a ceremony attended by Mayor Angelo Joseph Rossi, having been designed by Joseph Strauss, chief engineer of the Golden Gate Bridge. At the time, it carried pedestrians, automobiles, and streetcars along an extension of Third Street. Steam trains of the State Belt Railroad were intended to utilize the span, though laying of tracks to the south were deferred to a later date. The bridge was renamed in 1980 in honor of baseball player Lefty O'Doul. It was retrofitted in 1999, prior to the opening of the adjacent ballpark, originally named Pacific Bell Park.

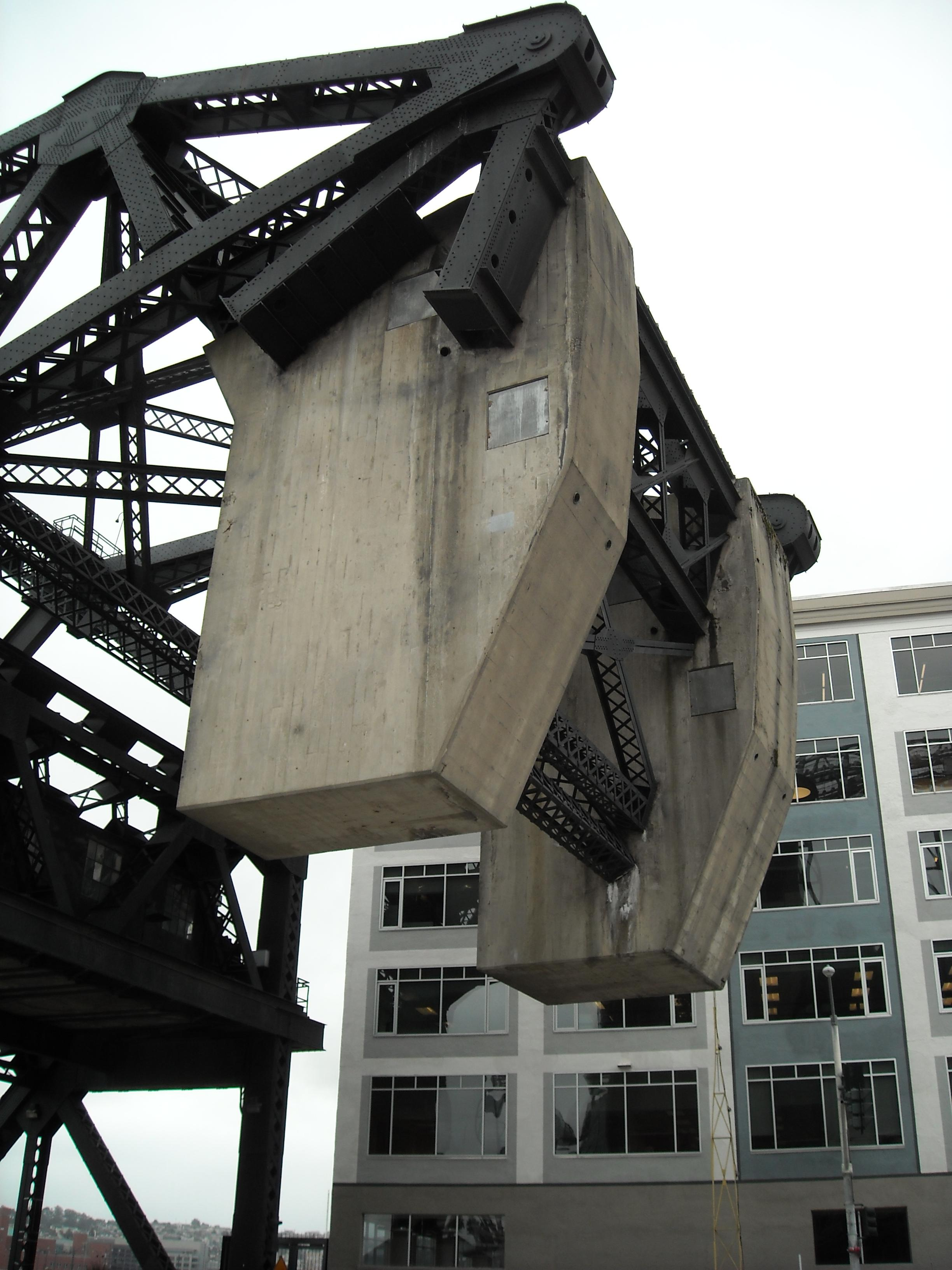
Concrete counterweights for lifting the bridge

=== Usage ===
The bridge carries four lanes of car traffic and a bidirectional, class IV (on-street protected) bike lane.

=== In popular culture ===
The bridge has been featured as a filming location in five films: The Dirty Harry films Magnum Force (1973) The Enforcer (1976) and Sudden Impact (1983), the James Bond movie A View to a Kill (1985) (where Bond drives a fire truck over the opened bridge), and San Andreas (2015).
