= 350 Mission Street =

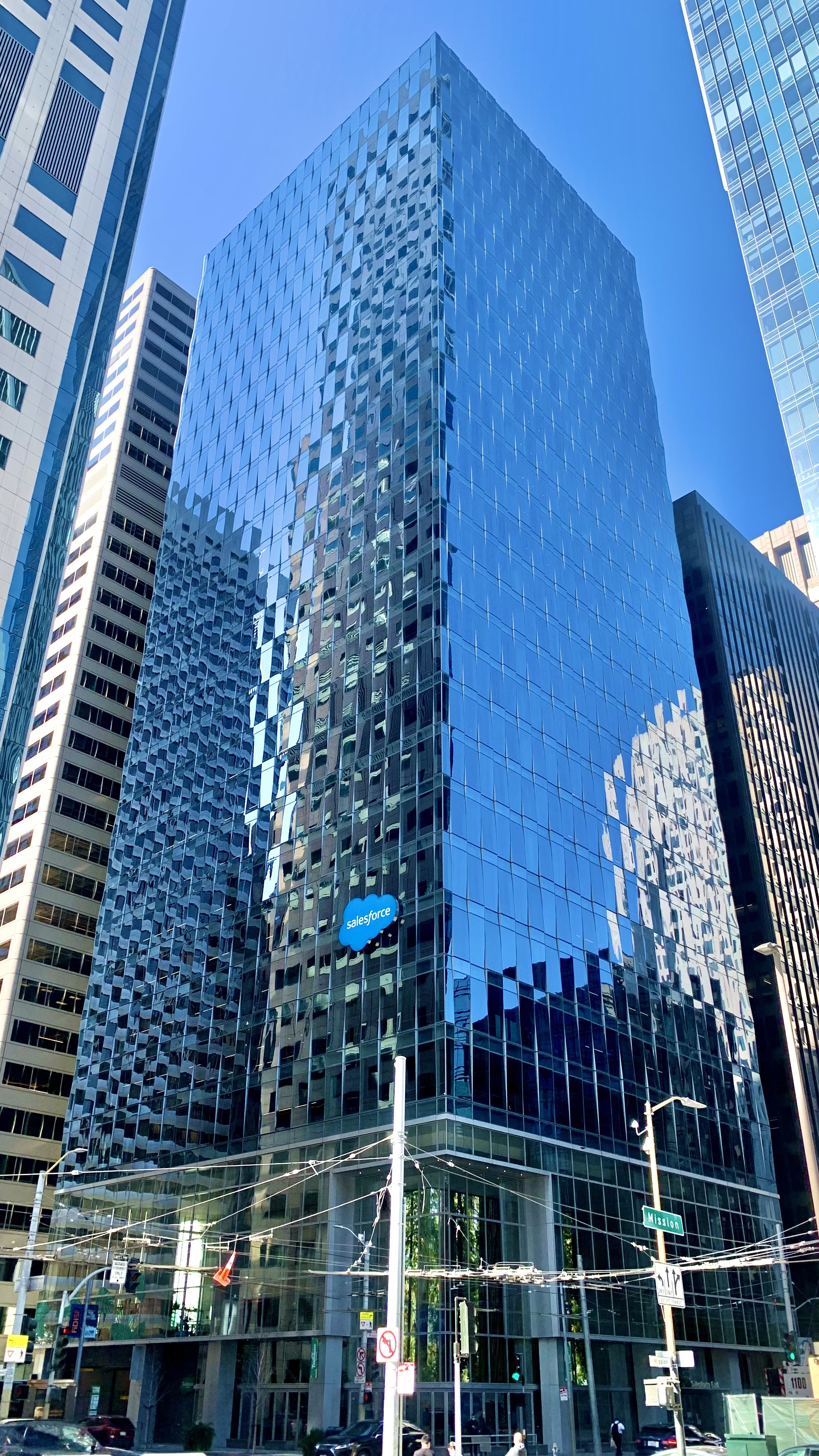
- The building in 2021

- Location within San Francisco 350 Mission Street (California)

General information
- Status: Completed
- Type: Commercial offices
- Architectural style: Modernism
- Location: 350 Mission Street; San Francisco, California
- Coordinates: 37.7908°N 122.3966°W
- Construction started: February 2013
- Completed: 2015
- Cost: US$250 million

Height
- Tip: 455 ft (139 m)
- Roof: 424 ft (129 m)

Technical details
- Floor count: 30
- Floor area: 455,350 sq ft (42,000 m^{2})

Design and construction
- Architect: Skidmore, Owings and Merrill
- Developer: Kilroy Realty Corporation
- Structural engineer: Skidmore, Owings and Merrill
- Main contractor: Webcor Builders

Other information
- Parking: 60 car 64 bicycle

Salesforce East is a 30-story skyscraper in the South of Market district of San Francisco, California.

== Location and architecture ==
350 Mission Street is located at the northeast corner of Fremont Street and Mission Street in a part of the South of Market district typically considered an extension of the Financial District. It is located near several other downtown skyscrapers, including the adjacent Blue Shield of California Building and 45 Fremont Street. Across Fremont Street to the west is Salesforce West, and across Mission Street to the east is Millennium Tower. To the south, at the opposite corner of the intersection is the site of the Transbay Tower. It is located a block from Market Street and a half block from the new Transbay Transit Center.

The building has attained LEED Platinum status.

== History ==
The first version of the project was initially proposed at 850 ft (259 m) with 1 million sq ft (93,000 m^{2}) of office space, but the developer reduced the project height by 300 ft (91 m) and the floor area by over 600,000 sq ft (55,700 m^{2}). This was because the first version of the project exceeded the local height limit by 300 ft (91 m).

The second version of the project was compliant with the local 550 ft (168 m) height restriction. Even though the city of San Francisco released a zoning plan that allowed the tower to rise as high as 700 ft (213 m) on May 1, 2008, the developer the reduced size of the project to 375 ft (114 m) about two months later. The third version stood significantly shorter than the proposed height limit because the developer stated that it was uneconomical to build any taller on a 19,000 sq ft (1,800 m^{2})-sized lot. The square footage of the building increased slightly to 350,000 sq ft (33,000 m^{2}), up from 340,000 sq ft (32,000 m^{2}).

In October 2012, GLL Development & Management sold the project to Kilroy Realty for US$52 million. In December 2012, Salesforce.com agreed to lease the entirety of the proposed tower, and Kilroy sought to add an additional six stories to the proposed 24-story tower, increasing the office space to 420,000 square feet (39,000 m^{2}). In February 2013, demolition started on the site's existing four-story building, formerly the home of Heald College. On August 15, 2013, the S.F. Planning Commission officially approved the height increase to 30 stories. Kilroy completed the project in 2015.

In 2021, Internet company Yelp subleased 53,596 sq ft from Salesforce, as part of downsizing its offices and giving up its former headquarters at nearby 140 New Montgomery Street due to the rise of remote work in the COVID-19 pandemic. In April 2023, Salesforce listed the remainder of its office space in the Salesforce East building for sublease as part of its ongoing downsizing efforts.

As of May 2023, during what the San Francisco Chronicle described as "Downtown San Francisco['s] worst office vacancy crisis on record," the building had a vacancy rate of 21.1%.

On September 6, 2024, a pane of glass fell from the roof level of the building and damaged ground floor windows of the neighboring Millennium Tower.

== See also ==
- List of tallest buildings in San Francisco
