= Blue Shield =

Blue Shield may refer to:

- Blue Shield emblem, a distinctive symbol marking cultural property defined by the 1954 Hague Convention
- Blue Shield International, an international organization named after the Blue Shield emblem that protects cultural property in emergencies
- Blue Cross and Blue Shield Association, an American health insurance group
- Blue Shield of California, health plan based in San Francisco, California
- Blue Shield of California Building
- Blue Shield (character), a Marvel Comics Superhero
- Blue Code of Silence, also known as blue shield, an informal code of silence among police officers in the US
