= Apple Campus (disambiguation) =

Apple Campus may refer to one of three Silicon Valley building complexes owned by Apple, Inc.:

- Apple Infinite Loop, Apple's old Cupertino headquarters and sometimes referred to as "Apple Campus"
- Apple Park, Apple's present Cupertino headquarters and formerly known as "Apple Campus 2"
- Apple Campus 3, Apple offices located in Sunnyvale, California
