= 45 Fremont Street =

Skyscraper in San Francisco

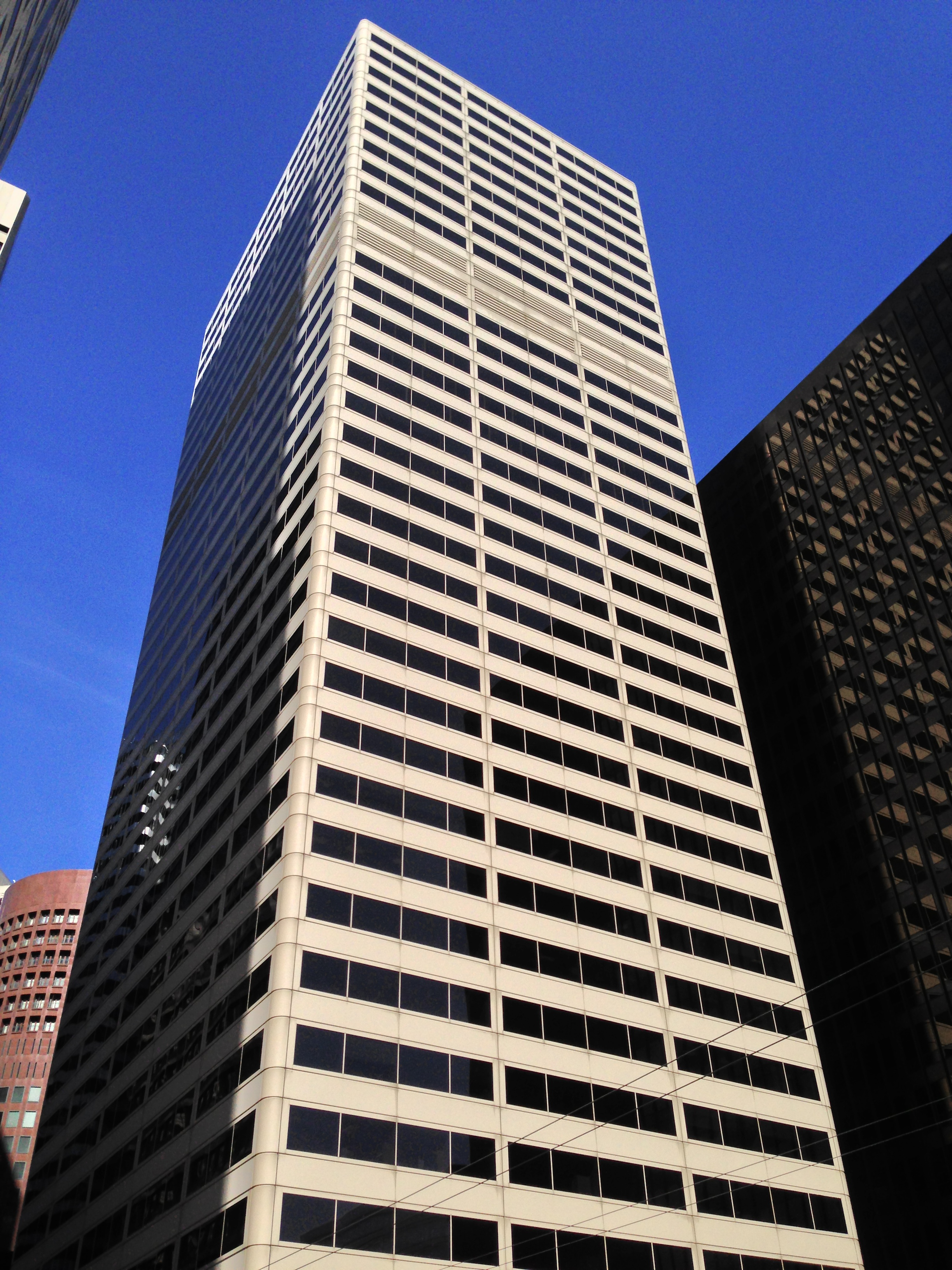

- Location within San Francisco 45 Fremont Street (California) 45 Fremont Street (the United States)
- Alternative names: Bechtel Building

General information
- Type: Commercial offices
- Location: 45 Fremont Street; San Francisco, California
- Coordinates: 37.7912°N 122.3971°W
- Completed: 1978
- Owner: Shorenstein Properties

Height
- Roof: 476 ft (145 m)

Technical details
- Floor count: 34
- Floor area: 596,059 ft^{2} (55,375.7 m^{2})
- Lifts/elevators: 19 passenger

Design and construction
- Architect: Skidmore, Owings & Merrill
- Main contractor: Cahill Contractors

45 Fremont Street is a 34-story, 476 ft (145 m) office skyscraper in the Financial District of San Francisco, California between Market Street and Mission Street. Completed in 1978, the tower is often referenced as the Bechtel Building because of the spillover of offices from the Bechtel Corporation world headquarters next door at 50 Beale Street.

In 2017, Blackstone obtained a 49.6% stake in the building for reportedly over $230 million, but wrote its investment down to zero in 2023 due to "the well-known headwinds facing U.S. traditional office buildings at the time".

== Major tenants ==
- Gensler
- Wells Fargo Securities/ Investment Banking
- L.E.K. Consulting
- Birst
- ClearSlide
- KPFF Consulting Engineers
- Lambda AI
- Dechert LLP

== See also ==
- San Francisco's tallest buildings
