= Palace Hotel Residential Tower =

Proposed residential skyscraper in San Francisco

- Location within San Francisco Palace Hotel Residential Tower (California) Palace Hotel Residential Tower (the United States)

General information
- Type: Residential
- Location: Jessie & Annie Streets; San Francisco, California
- Coordinates: 37.787269°N 122.401526°W

Height
- Roof: 204 m (669 ft)

Technical details
- Floor count: 60

Design and construction
- Architect: Skidmore, Owings & Merrill

The Palace Hotel Residential Tower was a residential skyscraper proposed in 2006, which was to have been built at the corner of Jessie & Annie Streets in the South of Market district of San Francisco, California. At 204 m (669 ft) and 60 stories, it would have been the tallest residential building in the city, and the tallest South of Market. Had it been constructed, prior to the 2008 financial crisis, the tower would have replaced an annex of the Palace Hotel.

The project would have been limited by zoning laws released by the San Francisco Planning Department on May 1, 2008, permitting a maximum height of 400 ft (120 m). However, in 2012, the height limit was raised to 600 feet (180 m) as part of the broader Transit Center District Plan that raised building heights in the area.

== See also ==
- San Francisco's tallest buildings
- San Francisco Transbay development
