= Park Tower at Transbay =

43-story, 605-foot office skyscraper in San Francisco

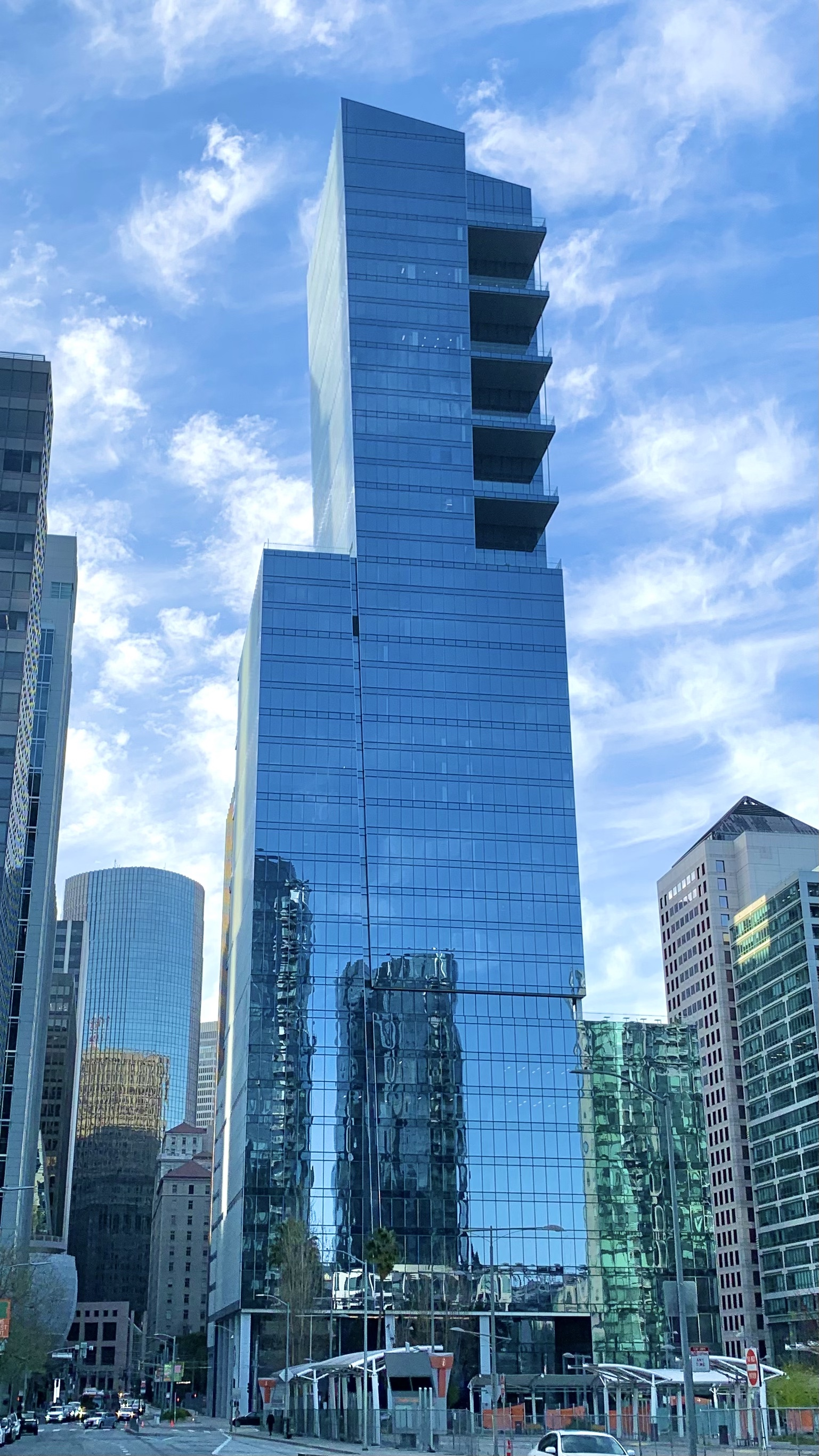
- In March 2021

- Location within San Francisco Park Tower at Transbay (California) Park Tower at Transbay (the United States)

General information
- Status: Completed
- Type: Commercial offices
- Location: 250 Howard Street; San Francisco, California
- Coordinates: 37.7903°N 122.3943°W
- Construction started: October 2015
- Completed: 2018

Height
- Architectural: 605 ft (184 m)
- Roof: 550 ft (170 m)

Technical details
- Floor count: 43
- Floor area: 743,000 sq ft (69,000 m^{2})

Design and construction
- Architects: Goettsch Partners; Solomon Coldwell Buenz
- Developer: MetLife Inc. John Buck Co. Golub Real Estate Development

Park Tower at Transbay is a 43-story, 605-foot (184 m) office skyscraper in San Francisco, California. The tower is located on Block 5 of the San Francisco Transbay development plan at the corner of Beale and Howard Streets, near the Salesforce Transit Center. The tower contains 743,000 square feet (69,000 m^{2}) of office space. The entire office space has been leased by Facebook.

== History ==
Block 5, an area bounded by Howard, Main, Beale and Natoma Streets, was formerly a state-owned parcel used for ramps leading to the since-demolished Transbay Terminal and Embarcadero Freeway. The block is bisected by a driveway for the neighboring Providian Financial Building. Although zoned for residential development, the San Francisco Office of Community Investment and Infrastructure issued a request for proposal for a 550-foot (170 m) tower with 700,000 square feet (65,000 m^{2}) of office space.

Four development teams submitted proposals for the site: Boston Properties with Kohn Pedersen Fox; Golub Real Estate and The John Buck Company with Goettsch Partners and Solomon Cordwell Buenz; Jay Paul Company with Skidmore, Owings & Merrill; and Kilroy Realty with Pelli Clarke Pelli. The proposal from Golub Real Estate and The John Buck Company was ultimately selected, featuring a number of large, outdoor terraces on both the northwest and southeast corners of the building. The development group paid US$172.5 million to acquire the property in September 2015. Ceremonial groundbreaking took place on October 6, 2015, with MetLife taking a majority stake in the project, reportedly worth US$345 million for a 95% ownership stake. The lobby was designed by Interior Architects.

== Images ==
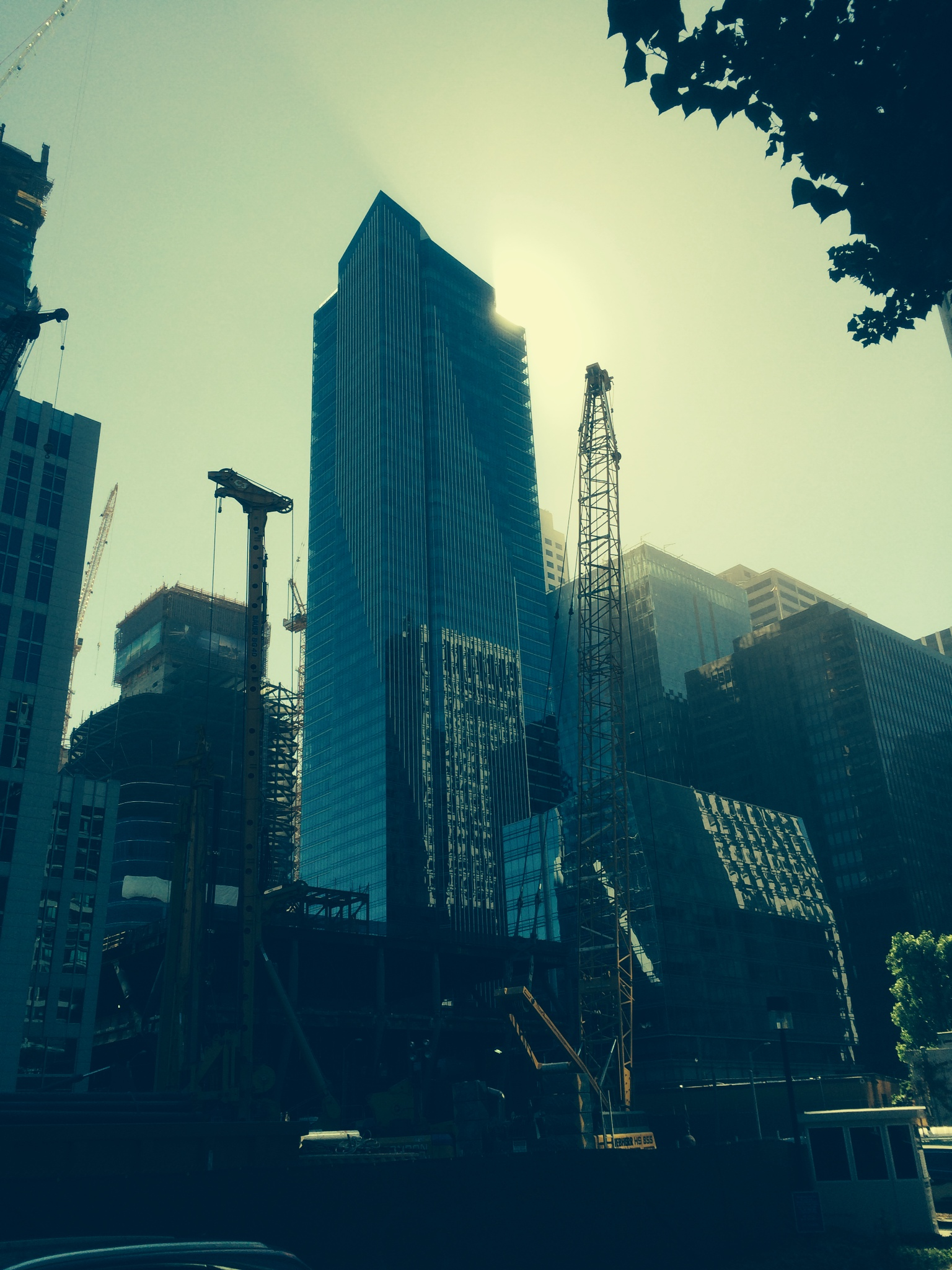
The cranes constructing the foundation, in front of the Millennium Tower and Transbay Terminal, and in the distance the Salesforce Tower and 181 Fremont Tower under construction.

The excavation and foundation construction on Nov 3, 2016.

Basement construction nears ground level and crossbracing being removed on Jan 31, 2017.

== See also ==
- List of tallest buildings in San Francisco
