= San Francisco Transbay development =

Salesforce Transit Center & Tower
- Interactive map of the Salesforce Transit Center & Tower area

General information
- Status: Completed
- Type: Commercial offices
- Location: Mission Street; San Francisco, California
- Coordinates: 37.7899°N 122.3969°W
- Opening: 2017–19

Height
- Antenna spire: 1,070 ft (326 m)
- Roof: 920 ft (280 m)

Technical details
- Floor count: 61
- Floor area: 1,300,000 sq ft (120,000 m^{2})

Design and construction
- Architect: Cesar Pelli
- Developer: Boston Properties; Hines Interests Limited Partnership
- Engineer: Magnusson Klemencic Associates

The San Francisco Transbay development is a completed redevelopment plan for the neighborhood surrounding the Salesforce Transit Center site, South of Market near the Financial District in San Francisco, California. The new transit center replaced the since-demolished San Francisco Transbay Terminal, and new skyscrapers, such as Salesforce Tower, took advantage of the height increases allowed through the San Francisco Transit Center District Plan. The sale of several land parcels formerly owned by the state and given to the managing Transbay Joint Powers Authority helped finance the construction of the transit center.

== History ==
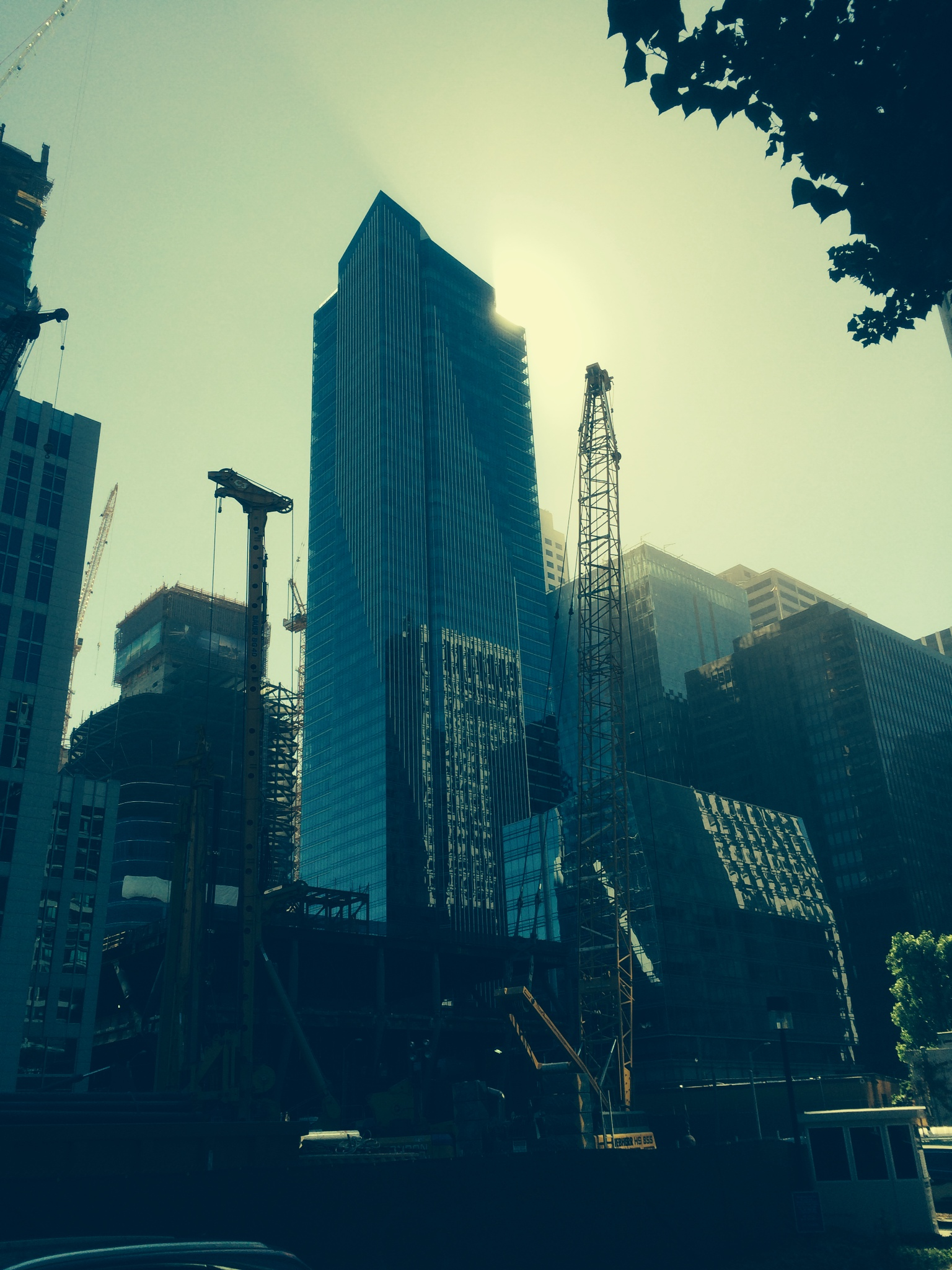
Downtown San Francisco, showing Millennium Tower (301 Mission St) center, behind it left the Salesforce Tower (under construction), far left top the 181 Fremont Street Tower (under construction), and foreground the cranes for the Park Tower (under construction) in front of the bare structure of the Transbay Terminal (under construction). From the parking lot of the Providian Financial Building / 201 Mission St, on Howard between Beale and Main.

The original Transbay Terminal opened in 1939 as the San Francisco terminus for the Key System and other commuter trains that travelled across the new San Francisco–Oakland Bay Bridge to the East Bay. Train service to San Francisco was discontinued in 1958 and the Transbay Terminal was reconfigured for buses. Transbay train service would resume in 1974 with the opening of BART and the Transbay Tube, but the BART tracks were routed under Market Street, bypassing the Transbay Terminal. By the end of the 20th century, the Transbay Terminal was underused and rundown, handling an average of about 20,000 commuters per day.

In 1985, San Francisco adopted the Downtown Plan, which slowed development in the Financial District north of Market Street and directed it to the area South of Market around the Transbay Terminal. In the early 1990s, the Embarcadero Freeway was demolished following the 1989 Loma Prieta earthquake, freeing up numerous city blocks for development south of the Transbay Terminal. In 1995, Caltrain agreed to study extending its commuter rail service from its 4th and King terminus closer to the Financial District, including whether the obsolete Transbay Terminal should be removed, remodeled, or rebuilt.

Ultimately, it was decided that the Transbay Terminal should be rebuilt, with the rail extension entering the Terminal under Second Street. In 1996, then-San Francisco Mayor Willie Brown issued the idea of redeveloping the earthquake-damaged Transbay Transit Center. To that end, Brown tapped his then-new deputy Mayor Maria Ayerdi Kaplan to head the project. Kaplan created, and then became executive director of, the Transbay Joint Powers Authority in 2008.

To finance the projects and promote development in the area, the Transbay Redevelopment Plan was adopted by the City of San Francisco in June 2005. By raising a number of building height limits and selling former freeway parcels, the plan envisions the development of over 2,500 new homes, 3 million square feet of new office and commercial space, and 100,000 square feet of retail.

== Developments ==
=== Salesforce Transit Center ===
Designed by Pelli Clarke Pelli, the new Salesforce Transit Center replaced the former Transbay Terminal at a cost of roughly $2 billion USD and has been dubbed the "Grand Central Station of the West" by proponents. The new center is planned to eventually include an extension of the Caltrain commuter rail service into the station from its current northern terminus at 4th and King Streets in Mission Bay via tunnels which would also carry the Bay Area segment of the future California High-Speed Rail (CAHSR) and terminate at the station, as mandated by California voters in Proposition 1A, the ballot measure authorizing CAHSR construction. This extension would cost an additional $2–4 billion and is currently unfunded.

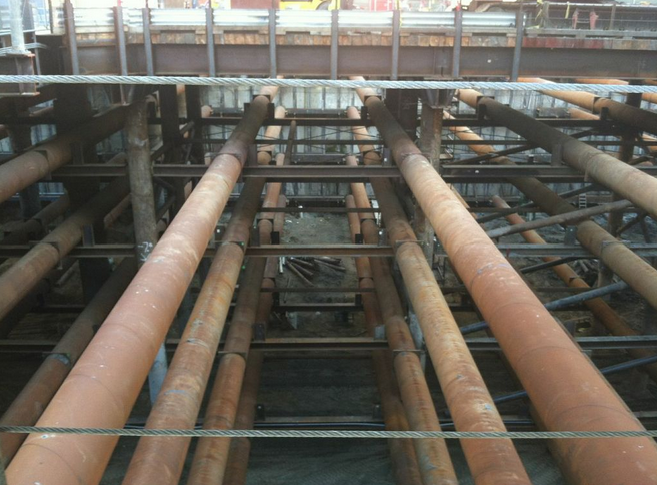
Salesforce Transit Center construction site.

The Transit Center currently has three levels plus a 5.4-acre (2.2 ha) public rooftop park. The ground level is the street entrance to the Transit Center. Above that are administrative offices, retail shops, restaurants, and the Amtrak/Greyhound waiting room. The final indoors level services Transbay buses from San Francisco's Muni, the East Bay's AC Transit, and WestCAT, as well as long-distance buses operated by Greyhound and Amtrak Thruway. Future Caltrain and HSR service would utilize two underground levels, the lower of which would house the tracks and platforms, and the upper of which would house a retail concourse and waiting areas.

=== Salesforce Tower ===
Adjacent to the Transit Center and at the center of the redevelopment effort is a signature skyscraper at First and Mission Streets. The proposal featured plans from several major architecture firms including Skidmore, Owings & Merrill, Richard Rogers Partnership, and Pelli Clarke Pelli Architects. Eventually the plan from Pelli Clarke Pelli Architects was picked. The original plans from Pelli Clark Pelli Architects called for a 1,200-foot (370 m) tower as the main tower and a massive three-block-long Transbay Center. However, due to considerations about how the tower would cast a shadow over some of the city's parks, the height was eventually reduced to 1,070 feet (330 m).

The designs to the supertall tower changed during its planning phase, its final design eventually incorporates slits at each side of its angular top along with an altered terminal station design. However some of the original design cues were later restored and reincorporated due to complaints about the design modifications. The tower and the new terminal had their groundbreaking ceremonies on March 27, 2013. The office tower opened in early 2018, followed by the Transit Center in August of that same year.

=== Increased height limits ===
With the adoption of the Transit Center District Plan in 2012, height limits were raised for several parcels in the vicinity of the Transit Center. Among the parcels zoned for taller buildings are 50 First Street, 181 Fremont Street, 350 Mission Street, Golden Gate University's campus at 536 Mission Street, the proposed Palace Hotel Residential Tower, and the Salesforce Tower site.

=== Former freeway parcels and bus ramps ===
Following the 1989 Loma Prieta earthquake, the Embarcadero Freeway was torn down, opening up a number of blocks for development. Several other parcels, near Beale and Howard streets, were used for the East Loop Ramp of the Transbay Terminal and are not needed for the new Transit Center. In 2007, the state of California officially agreed to transfer the state-owned parcels to the City and County of San Francisco.

The former freeway parcels are located mostly along the north side of Folsom Street between Essex and Spear and have been zoned for residential use. Other lots, called Parcel F, Parcel M, and Parcel T, have been zoned for office buildings. Parcel T is the site of Salesforce Tower. As of 2013, Transbay Joint Powers Authority has accepted proposals for Blocks 6/7 and Block 9. The first parcel developed was Block 11, also known as the Rene Cazenave Apartments, an affordable housing project located at 25 Essex Street.

Parcel	Zoning	Sold	Price	Use	Location	Reference
Block 1	Residential	2016	$50.18 million	400-foot Folsom Bay Tower with 391 units, including 156 affordable-rate	37.79°N 122.39167°W	
Block 2	Residential			Temporary Transbay Terminal	37.789271°N 122.392612°W	
Block 3	Park	—	—	Temporary Transbay Terminal; Slated to become Transbay Park	37.789688°N 122.393132°W	
Block 4	Residential			Temporary Transbay Terminal	37.790097°N 122.393618°W	
Block 5	Residential	2015	$172.5 million	Although zoned for residential, will become Park Tower at Transbay office building	250 Howard Street	
Block 6	Residential	2013	$30 million	300-foot tower with 409 market-rate units and 70 affordable units	299 Fremont Street	
Block 7	Residential	2013	—	77 units to be built by Mercy Housing	37.788948°N 122.393939°W	
Block 8	Residential	2014	$72 million	550-foot, 740-unit residential tower	37.787941°N 122.394358°W	
Block 9	Residential	2013	$43.32 million	400-foot, 537-unit residential tower	500 Folsom Street	
Block 10	Park	—	—	Planned Transbay Terminal Under Ramp Park	37.786657°N 122.395924°W	
Block 11	Residential	2011	—	120-unit Rene Cazenave Apartments	25 Essex Street	
Block 12	Residential				37.784363°N 122.394771°W	
Parcel F	Commercial Office	2016	$160 million	61-story, 800-foot tower, with 16 floors of offices, a 220-room hotel, and 175 condos	37.787636°N 122.397695°W	
Parcel M	Commercial Office				37.791324°N 122.394637°W	
Parcel T	Commercial Office	2013	$191.8 million	Salesforce Tower	415 Mission Street	

== Transbay Joint Powers Authority ==
The Transbay Joint Powers Authority (TJPA) oversees the design, construction, operation, and maintenance of the Salesforce Transit Center. The charter of the TJPA includes three initiatives:

- Replacing the San Francisco Transbay Terminal
- Extending the Caltrain rail line
- Redeveloping the area surrounding the Salesforce Transit Center

The TJPA was created in 2001 as a collaboration of several Bay Area government and transportation agencies. It coordinates the efforts of 11 local, regional, and statewide transit systems.

== See also ==
- List of tallest buildings in San Francisco
