= Apple Wolfe campus =

Office complex in California owned by Apple

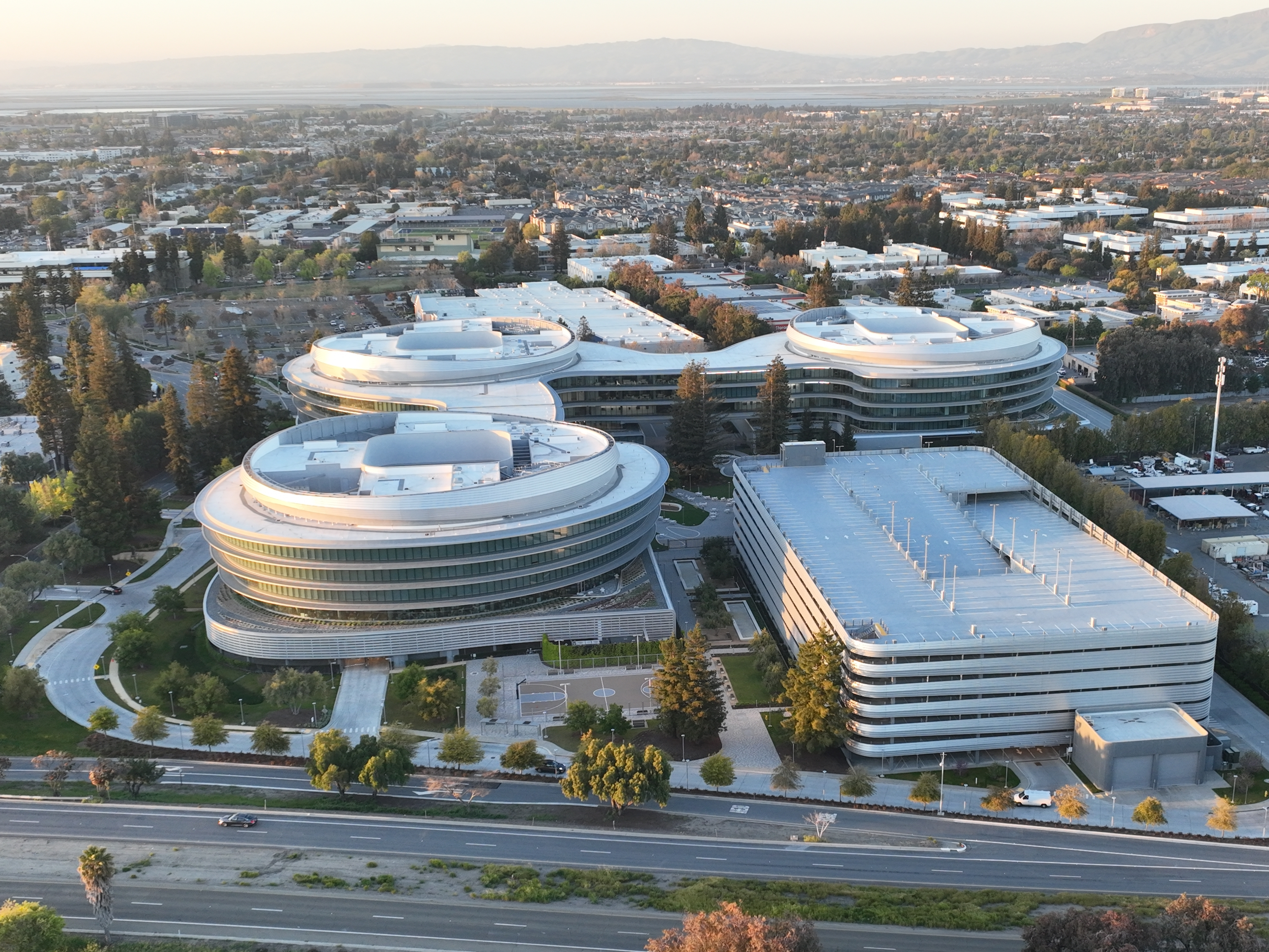
- Overhead view, April 2023

- Location within San Francisco Bay Area Location within California Location within the United States
- Alternative names: Apple Campus 3 (AC3), Central & Wolfe

General information
- Status: Completed
- Location: 280 North Wolfe Road, Sunnyvale, California, United States
- Coordinates: 37.3797°N 122.0107°W
- Completed: 2018
- Client: Apple and Jay Paul Company
- Owner: Apple

Technical details
- Floor count: 5 + 2 parking
- Floor area: 882,000 sq ft (81,900 m^{2})
- Grounds: 18 acres (7.3 ha; 73,000 m^{2})

Design and construction
- Architect: Paul Woolford
- Architecture firm: HOK
- Developer: Landbank
- Other designers: Korth Sunseri Hagey
- Main contractor: Level 10 Construction
- Awards: 2019 American Architecture Award
- Designations: LEED Platinum

The Apple Wolfe campus (known as Apple Campus 3/AC3 and Central & Wolfe during development), is an office complex owned and occupied by Apple in Sunnyvale, California. The campus was completed in 2018 and is one of Apple's office facilities in Silicon Valley. The project was originally designed by HOK and constructed by the HOK-owned Level 10 Construction. The campus was developed speculatively by the Jay Paul Company and Landbank before Apple acquired the project during construction.

== Location and transportation access ==
The complex is in Sunnyvale, California, next to the Central Expressway at Wolfe Road, about 4 miles (6 km) north of Apple's current headquarters at Apple Park and former headquarters on Infinite Loop (both in Cupertino). The site is closer to Caltrain stations (the Sunnyvale and Lawrence stations) than the other two campuses, and is thus more conveniently located for workers to use Caltrain for transportation, although it is still further than usual walking distance, so commuting by Caltrain typically also involves a company shuttle bus. Transit between the site and Apple Park takes about 10 minutes by car or an hour by city bus, and Apple provides shuttle buses for employees.

== Design ==
The land area of the site is 17.84 acres (7.22 ha; 72,200 m^{2}). The multi-story office buildings have 882,857 square feet (82,020 m^{2}) of occupiable floor space across three buildings, supplemented by a 1,010,000-square-foot (94,000 m^{2}) multi-level parking garage, and a 34,000-square-foot (3,200 m^{2}) amenities building, bringing the campus' total building square footage to nearly 1,927,000 square feet (179,000 m^{2}). The complex is dominated by three office buildings which are interconnected with two 60-foot-wide (18 m) connecting regions, each building having four stories of office space atop a ground floor that houses entry lobbies and amenity areas and two levels of underground parking. Landscaped open space covers 53% of the total area. The smaller amenities building features a Caffè Macs corporate cafeteria. Each floor of every office building has about 62,000 square feet (5,800 m^{2}) of floor space and a ceiling height of 13.5 feet (4.1 m). The three main buildings have platinum-level LEED 2009 Commercial Interiors as certified by the U.S. Green Building Council.
