= 181 Fremont =

Skyscraper in California, United States

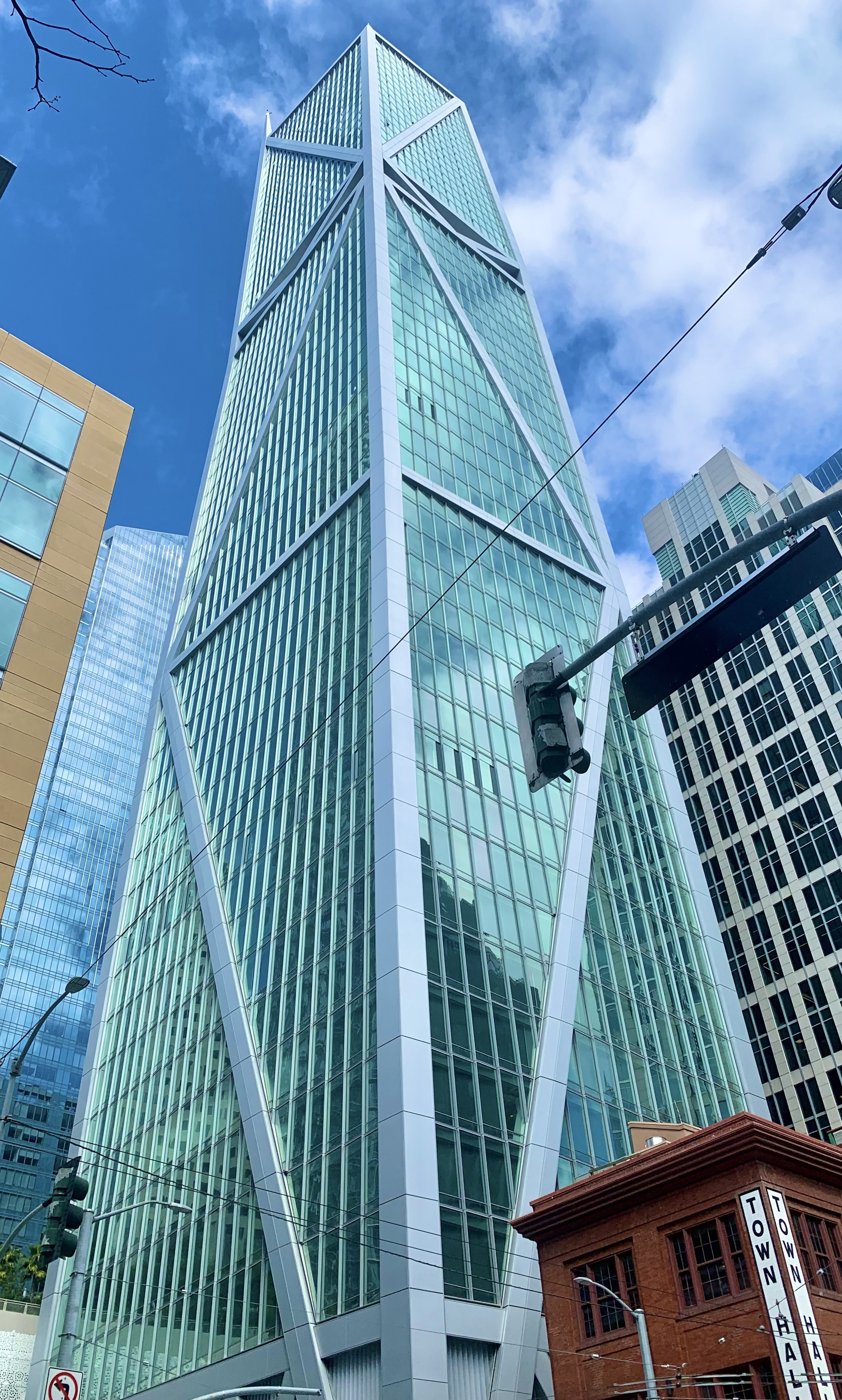
- 181 Fremont in March 2021

- Location within San Francisco 181 Fremont (California) 181 Fremont (the United States)
- Alternative names: 181 Fremont Street

General information
- Status: Completed
- Type: Commercial offices Residential condominiums
- Architectural style: Modernism
- Location: 181 Fremont Street; San Francisco, California
- Coordinates: 37.78970°N 122.39535°W
- Construction started: 2013
- Completed: May 2018
- Cost: US$500 million
- Owner: Jay Paul Company

Height
- Antenna spire: 802.5 ft (244.6 m)
- Roof: 700 ft (210 m)
- Top floor: 673 ft (205 m)

Technical details
- Floor count: 57
- Floor area: 684,000 ft^{2} (63,500 m^{2})
- Lifts/elevators: 17

Design and construction
- Architect: Heller Manus Architects
- Developer: Jay Paul Company
- Structural engineer: Arup
- Main contractor: Level 10 Construction

Other information
- Number of units: 67

Website
- 181fremont.com

181 Fremont is an 803-foot (245 m) mixed-use skyscraper in the South of Market District of San Francisco, California. The building, designed by Heller Manus Architects, is located adjacent to the Transbay Transit Center and 199 Fremont Street developments. 181 Fremont is owned and operated by Jay Paul Company, which was the sole developer of the project. In 2025, Strava moved into a new headquarters office on four levels originally leased to Meta Platforms.

== Design ==
The slender mixed-use tower, developed initially by SKS Investments, rises 700 ft (210 m) to the roof with 55 floors of offices and residential condominiums. A parapet/mechanical screen reaches to 745 ft (227 m), and a spire brings the total height to 802.5 ft (244.6 m).

The tower contains 432,000 ft^{2} (40,100 m^{2}) of office space on the lower 35 floors (from 3 to 38), and 67 condominiums on the upper 16 floors (from 41 to 57). The 39th floor contains residential amenities and a two-story open air terrace. Mechanical spaces are on floors two and 40. The building has a direct connection to the rooftop park atop the adjacent Salesforce Transit Center from the 7th floor.

Upon completion, the tower was the tallest mixed-use building in San Francisco, surpassing the nearby Millennium Tower, and the 2nd-tallest in the Western United States. It was also the third tallest building in the city after the Transamerica Pyramid and the Salesforce Tower. 181 Fremont joins several other buildings designed to catalyze the San Francisco Transbay development area.

== History ==
In 2007, SKS proposed 181 Fremont Street as a 66 floor, 900-foot (274 m) tall mixed-use skyscraper, with 140 residential units and 500,000 square feet (46,452 m^{2}) of office space. The developers reduced the height of the project to comply with the parcel's 700-foot (213 m) height limit, as detailed in the Transbay Center District Plan approved in 2012. This height limit was twice as high as the previous restriction. The tower's design was approved in December 2012, and the development site was subsequently put on the market by SKS Investments.

On March 29, 2013, Jay Paul Company announced that it acquired the development from SKS Investments and planned "to immediately commence construction" with completion expected in the second quarter of 2015. According to Bloomberg, the building would cost US$375 million to construct, including land acquisition costs. Demolition of the existing structures began in August 2013, with tower construction expected to begin in November. Official groundbreaking ceremonies took place on November 12, 2013, and the luxury residences were officially named Park 181. The name was later changed to simply 181 Fremont Residences. Jay Paul Company announced that the building would cost US$500 million to construct and was scheduled to open in early 2017. On September 20, 2017, it was reported that Meta Platforms would lease the entire office portion of the building to form a new San Francisco office that included the Instagram division.

As of May 2023, during what the San Francisco Chronicle described as "Downtown San Francisco['s] worst office vacancy crisis on record," 181 Fremont had a vacancy rate of 100%, with Meta (formerly Facebook) putting up its entire 435,000 square feet for sublease. Zendesk moved its headquarters to the building in 2024. On March 5, 2025, Strava moved into a new headquarters office on four levels of the space made available by Meta for sublease.

Images of 181 Fremont
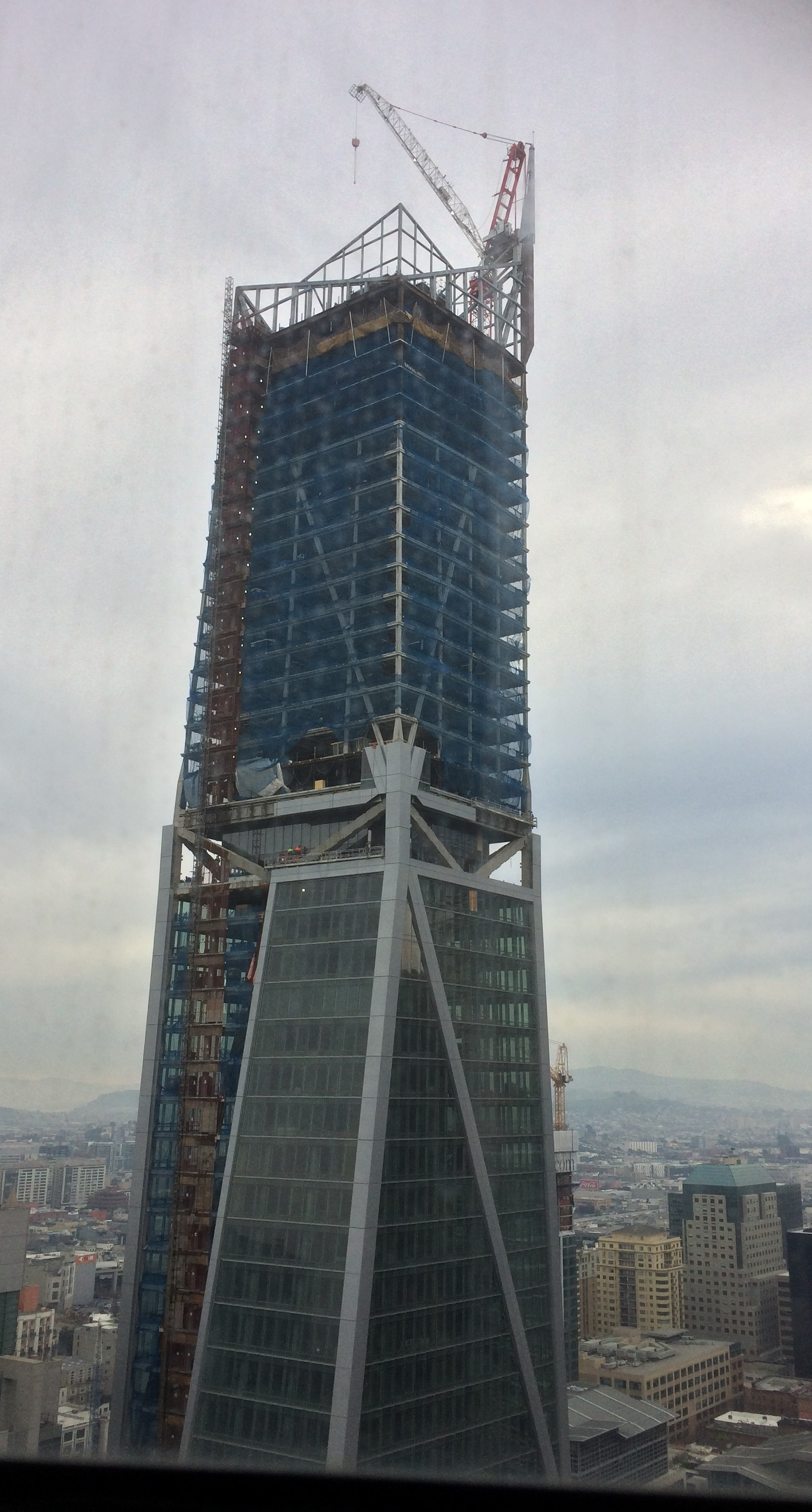
February 1, 2017. Installation of roof decorative structure in progress, window glass significantly complete on office floors.

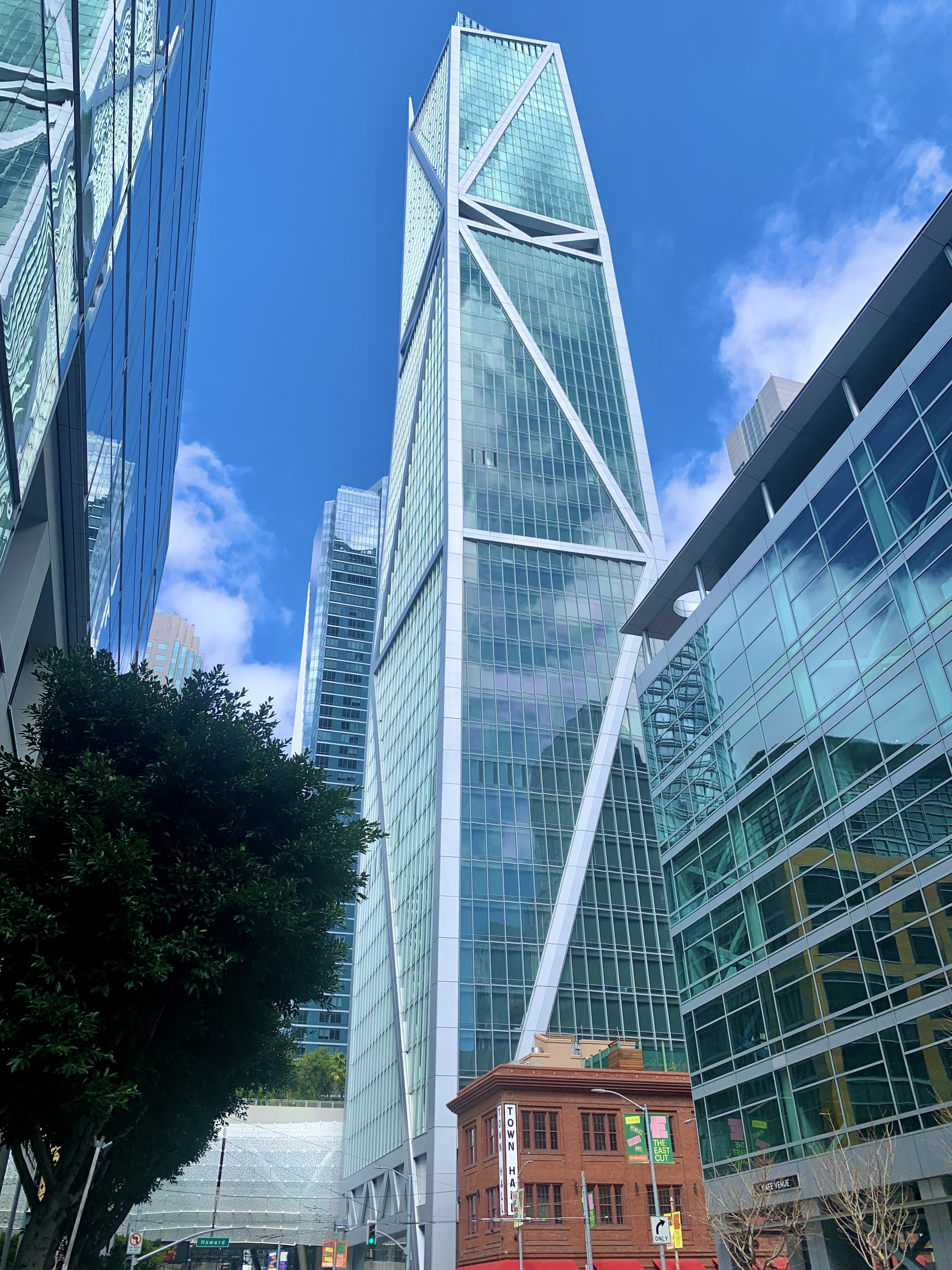
March 15, 2021

== See also ==
- San Francisco's tallest buildings
