= Jay Paul =

American real estate developer

- Born: Joseph Paul; 1947 or 1948 (age 78–79)
- Education: Boston University
- Occupation: Real estate developer
- Known for: Founder of Jay Paul Company
- Spouse: Married

Joseph "Jay" Paul (born 1947/1948) is an American billionaire real estate developer, based in San Francisco.

== Early life ==
Jay Paul was born in 1947 or 1948 and is a native of Rhode Island. He has a bachelor's degree from Boston University. In the 1970s, Paul moved to Southern California to help save his father's troubled investments, a savings-and-loan business. As a result of saving the investments, he formed and founded Jay Paul Company in 1975.

== Career ==
Jay Paul Company, a privately held real estate development company based in San Francisco, and focused on California. In the early years of Jay Paul Co., he invested in purchasing inexpensive office spaces. Since then, he primarily leases 11 million square feet of office spaces to tech firms, spanning Hewlett-Packard, Amazon, and Apple. There are plans to add 6 million more, primarily in Sunnyvale, California.

On June 16, 2020, San Jose council has approved Jay Paul's redevelopment project of a 3.79-million-square-foot office space in downtown San Jose.

As of July 2020, Paul's net worth is estimated at $3.5 billion, ranking him 1001 on Forbes Billionaires List of 2020.

== Personal life ==
Paul is married, has no children, lives in the Pacific Heights neighborhood of San Francisco, California, and owns two yachts. In 2012, he bought his Pacific Heights home for about $28 million, which underwent a large remodel for many years.

Paul is known as a very private person and does not give many interviews.
