= Jay Paul Company =

- Type: Privately held
- Industry: Real estate
- Founded: 1975; 51 years ago
- Founder: Jay Paul
- Headquarters: Silicon Valley
- Area served: San Francisco

Jay Paul Company is a privately held real estate development company, working primarily in Silicon Valley and based in San Francisco. The company holds more than 11 million square feet of office space in Silicon Valley, and growing.

== History ==
Jay Paul Company was founded in 1975, as a result of the founder, Jay Paul, saving his father's savings-and-loan business in Southern California. In the early 1980s, the company started building office spaces in Silicon Valley. In the late 1990s, Jay Paul Co. bought up part of Moffett Field for development, since then it has grown into five business complexes in a 1,156-acre business district known as Moffett Park within Sunnyvale, California.

Jay Paul Company's first project in the city of San Francisco was 181 Fremont, a skyscraper with a 70-story tower with offices and 67 luxury condos up top. 181 Fremont was completed in 2016, and at the time was the second-tallest building in San Francisco. It replaced a four-story building.

In 2018, Jay Paul Co. purchased Cityview Plaza in San Jose, California which will be an 11-acre, mixed-use development project and includes office, retail, a public plaza, and parking stalls.

It has been speculated that the success of the company has been due to investing in higher quality construction, with consideration of special features uncommonly found in traditional office spaces (such as volleyball courts, basketball gyms, onsite cafes, etc), and investing in spaces along major highways in order to encourage companies that want to display signs.
