= VerticalResponse =

VerticalResponse LLC.
- Industry: Email marketing, Email service provider (marketing), Social Media Marketing, SaaS
- Founded: St Petersburg, Florida, U.S. (2001)
- Founder: Janine Popick
- Headquarters: 111 2nd Ave Ne - Suite 1500; St Petersburg, Florida, U.S.
- Area served: Worldwide
- Key people: Andy Mentges (Entrepreneur, CEO); Jason Beyke(COO)
- Website: VerticalResponse.com

VerticalResponse, Inc. is an American company providing software for sending email marketing, online surveys and direct mail for direct marketing campaigns. VerticalResponse's market research has been quoted by multiple media outlets, including the Miami Herald, Associated Press, Bloomberg Businessweek and Forbes.

== History ==
Janine Popick launched Vertical Response in 2001 after spearheading direct and Internet marketing programs for brands including NBC Internet; XOOM.com; Claris Corp., a wholly owned subsidiary of Apple Inc.; and Symantec Corporation. The company secured $1.4 million from 18 angel investors in its first four years of existence. It turned its first profit in 2005.

In late 2011, VerticalResponse acquired privately held Roost, a social media marketing technology company which provides an online tool for managing social networking marketing campaigns.

In 2013, VerticalResponse was acquired by Deluxe Corporation.

== Awards ==
- About.com 2012 Reader's Choice Award Winner: Best Email Marketing Service
- Ranked #66 on the 2011 San Francisco Business Times Fast 100 List of Fastest-Growing Private Companies
- Ranked #343 Fastest Growing Company in North America on Deloitte's 2011 Technology Fast 500
- 2011 U.S. Chamber of Commerce Small Business Blue Ribbon Award
- 2010 San Francisco Chamber of Commerce "Ebbies" Award for Emerging Growth

== See also ==
- Email marketing
- Social Media Marketing
