= Blue Shield of California =

American mutual benefit corporation

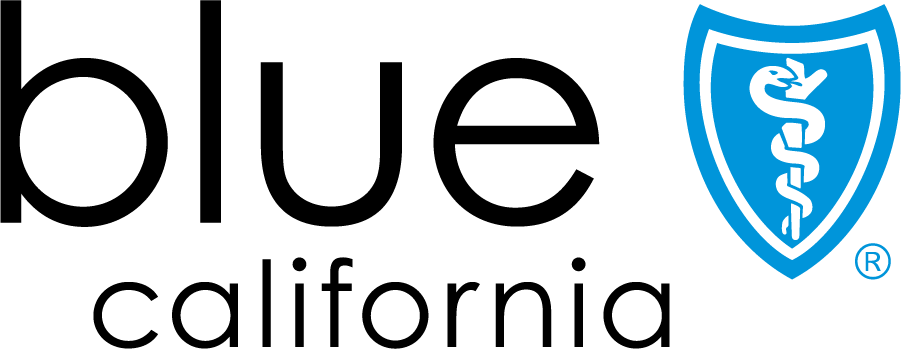
- Company type: Non-profit health plan (tax exempt status removed in 2014)
- Industry: Healthcare
- Founded: 1938 (created); 1939 (incorporated)
- Founder: California Medical Association
- Headquarters: 601 12th Street; Oakland, California
- Key people: Mike Stuart; Interim President and chief executive
- Revenue: ▲$21.8 billion USD (2020)
- Net income: ▲$680 million USD (2020)
- Members: ▲4.5 million (2021)
- Number of employees: 7,500 (2021)
- Website: blueshieldca.com

Blue Shield of California is a mutual benefit corporation and health plan, founded in 1939 by the California Medical Association. It is based in Oakland, California, and serves 4.5 million health plan members and more than 65,000 physicians across the state. Blue Shield of California was founded as a not-for-profit organization. As of 2014, it is no longer tax-exempt in California and has been paying federal taxes for years before that.

== History ==
Blue Shield of California, then known as California Physicians' Service, was created by the California Medical Association in 1938. The organization was incorporated in 1939 and began offering coverage on March 6 of that same year. In 1946, the organization was among the founders of the National Association of Blue Shield Plans, which later became the Blue Cross and Blue Shield Association. In 1950, the Blue Shield of California health plan began offering catastrophic coverage. By 1961, it had one million subscribers of its health plan. From 1966 to 2018, the organization was headquartered at 50 Beale Street in San Francisco.

In 1984, it began covering heart transplantations offered at Stanford University Medical Center.

The Blue Cross of California, which traditionally covered the hospital portion of insurance as a separate entity, went public in 1992 under the name Wellpoint, with the name later changing to Anthem. Blue Shield began offering information on benefits and enrollment on the Internet in 1996, and offering an online enrollment system for agents in 1998. In 1997, Blue Shield acquired the managed care company CareAmerica.

In 2006, Blue Shield agreed to a $6.5 million settlement relating to allegedly modifying the risk tier structure of its individual and family health care plans. In 2008, the organization settled for $3 million with the California Department of Managed Health Care to resolve allegations of improper rescission of individual health plan coverage. Further, the organization reinstated coverage to 450 members whose plans had been canceled and agreed to provide compensation for any medical debts incurred by these policyholders due to the rescission.

In 2010, Blue Shield of California, Dignity Health, and Hill Physicians Medical Group formed an Accountable Care Organization that covers 41,000 individuals in the California Public Employees Retirement System (CalPERS). During its first 2 years, this program reduced inpatient use and health care costs significantly.

In 2015, Blue Shield entered the Medicaid market by acquiring Care1st Health Plan. Blue Shield sold Care1st Arizona to WellCare in 2017. Care1st California was renamed Blue Shield of California Promise Health Plan in 2019.

In 2019, Blue Shield of California launched the healthcare company Altais. In 2020, Altais acquired the San Francisco practice Brown & Tolland. In 2021, Altais acquired the Los Angeles County practice Family Care Specialists.

== Network ==
Blue Shield of California's provider network currently includes 65,000 physicians and more than 340 hospitals statewide.

In the California Healthcare Quality Report Card 2009 Edition, Blue Shield of California received 3 out of 4 stars in Meeting National Standards of Care and 2 out of 4 stars in How Members Rate Their HMO.

== Financial ==
In 2011, Blue Shield announced that it would cap its net income at no more than 2% of revenue, contingent on approval from the board of directors. As of 2019, more than $600 million has been returned to customers and the community as a result of the pledge.

In 2014, Blue Shield of California lost its exemption from California state corporate income tax. This information became public in March 2015. A claimed recent application of the duck test resulted in the denial of Blue Shield's tax-exempt status. This was after "a lengthy state audit that looked at the justification for Blue Shield's taxpayer subsidy." Blue Shield holds billions in cash reserves and spends millions in executive pay. The organization defended its tax-exempt status, but failed to provide sufficient evidence to California Franchise Tax Board that its actions align with such obligations. As a result, Blue Shield became a tax-paying nonprofit.

In 2020, Blue Shield of California reported $21.8 billion in revenue and $680 million in net income.

== Controversies ==
In April 2025, Blue Shield of California notified members that it had shared private health data with Google Ads affecting 4,700,000 individuals.
