= Salesforce Tower =

Tallest building in San Francisco, US

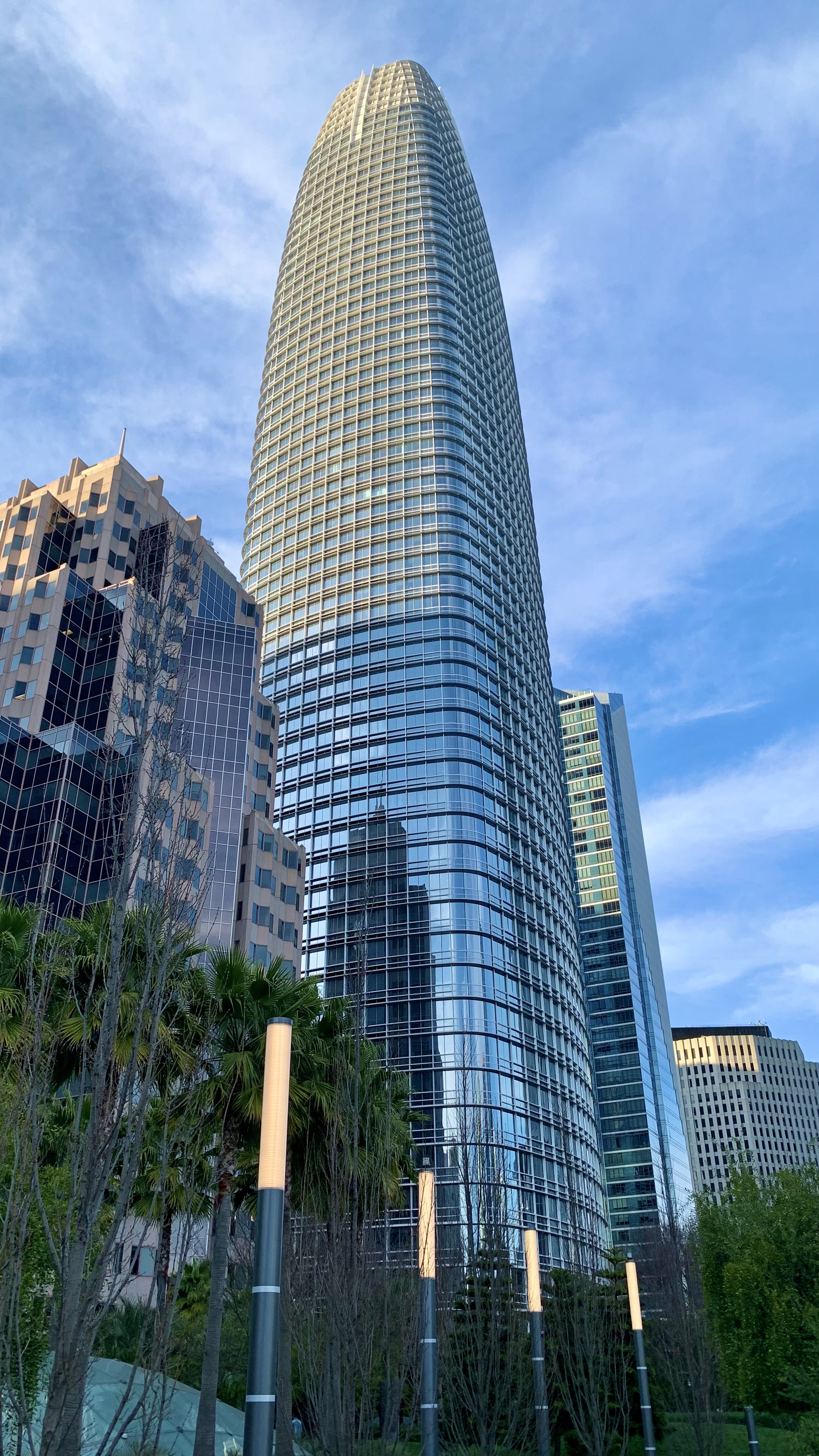
- View of Salesforce Tower from the Salesforce Park
- Former names: Transbay Tower

Record height
- Tallest in San Francisco since 2018^{[I]}
- Preceded by: Transamerica Pyramid

General information
- Type: Commercial offices, retail
- Location: 415 Mission Street; San Francisco, California
- Coordinates: 37.7899°N 122.3969°W
- Construction started: 2013
- Completed: 2018
- Opening: January 8, 2018
- Cost: US$1.1 billion
- Owner: Boston Properties

Height
- Architectural: 1,070 ft (326 m)
- Roof: 970 ft (296 m)

Technical details
- Floor count: 61
- Floor area: 1,400,000 sq ft (130,000 m^{2})
- Lifts/elevators: 34

Design and construction
- Architect: Pelli Clarke Pelli Architects
- Developer: Hines Interests Limited Partnership, Boston Properties
- Engineer: Magnusson Klemencic Associates
- Main contractor: Clark Construction Group Hathaway Dinwiddie

Other information
- Public transit: 5/5R, 7, 14/14R, 25, 38/38R; Montgomery, Embarcadero; Montgomery, Embarcadero; Other connections via Salesforce Transit Center

Website
- salesforcetower.com

Salesforce Tower, formerly known as Transbay Tower, is a 61-story supertall skyscraper at 415 Mission Street, between First and Fremont Street, in the South of Market district of downtown San Francisco. Its main tenant is Salesforce, a cloud-based software company. The building is 1,070 feet (326 m) tall, with a top roof height of 970 feet (296 m). Designed by César Pelli and developed by Hines Interests Limited Partnership and Boston Properties, it was the last building designed by Pelli to be completed in his lifetime. As of 2024, Salesforce Tower is the tallest building in San Francisco and the second-tallest building both in California and west of the Mississippi River after the 1,100-foot (335 m) Wilshire Grand Center in Los Angeles.

Salesforce Tower is obelisk-shaped, with a grid of metal fins running from the base of the building to the roof. The building sits on reclaimed land, and multiple load-bearing pillars reach below the foundation and into bedrock. The exterior of the building consists of a glass and steel curtain wall with a steel frame and a concrete core. Each floor of the building uses brises soleil to deflect sunlight. Salesforce Tower is designed to be a green building, with the building employing water conservation measures and air intake systems. A public art light sculpture at the top of the building, consisting of 11,000 LEDs, displays video animations every evening that can be seen from up to 30 miles (50 kilometers) away.

What is now the Salesforce Tower was planned as part of the San Francisco Transbay development, a redevelopment plan for the area surrounding the Salesforce Transit Center. The plan was adopted by the city in 2005. In 2011, the San Francisco Transbay Terminal was completely demolished, beginning the plan, and in 2013, construction on the building began. Salesforce Tower was completed in 2018 for over $1.1 billion. By 2019, Boston Properties had acquired a 100% stake in the property.

== Site ==
Salesforce Tower is located at 415 Mission Street, at the intersection of First and Fremont Street, south of Market Street and within the Financial District of San Francisco. The building's land lot is rectangular and covers 50,514 ft^{2} (4,692.9 m^{2}), while its frontage is 75.21 ft (22.92 m).

Salesforce Tower is adjacent to the Salesforce Transit Center, a 1,430 feet (440 m) transit station that replaced the San Francisco Transbay Terminal, which had been severely damaged as a result of the 1989 Loma Prieta earthquake and served as the central focus of the San Francisco redevelopment plan. The building is located near Millennium Tower.

== Architecture ==
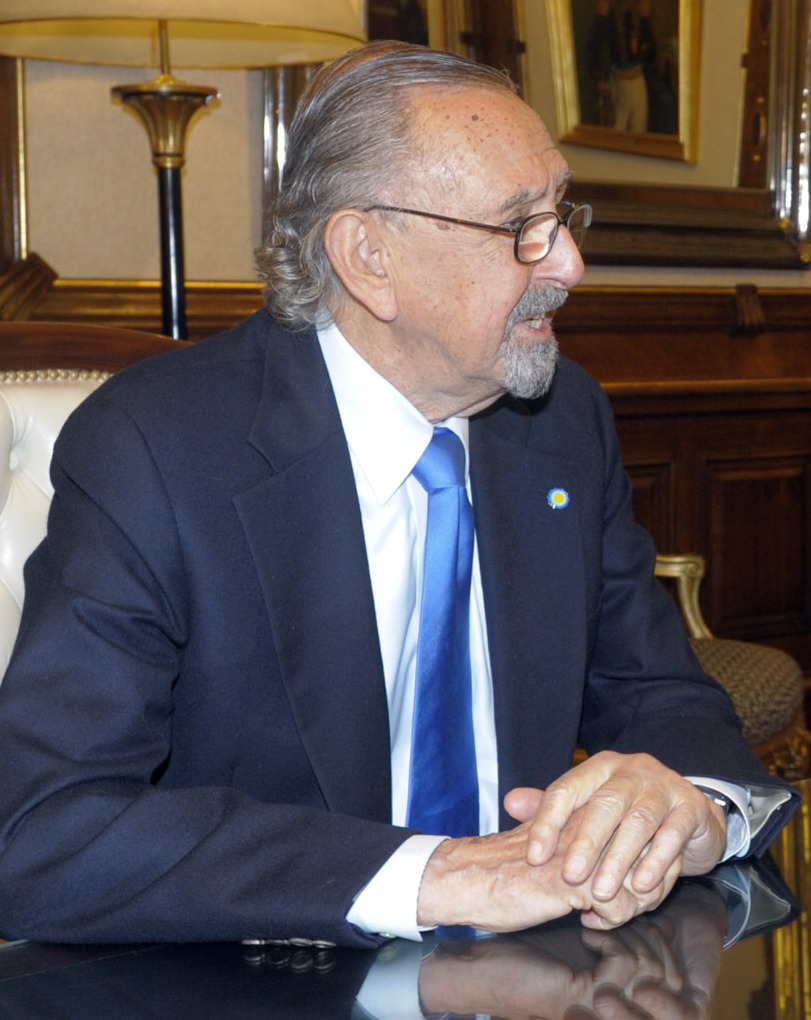
Argentine-American architect César Pelli designed Salesforce Tower.

Salesforce Tower was designed by Argentine-American architect César Pelli and developed by Hines Interests Limited Partnership and Boston Properties. In 2017, Pelli stated that the aim had been something "very tall, very big, but still polite and appropriate." It was one of Pelli's last finished works before his death in 2019.

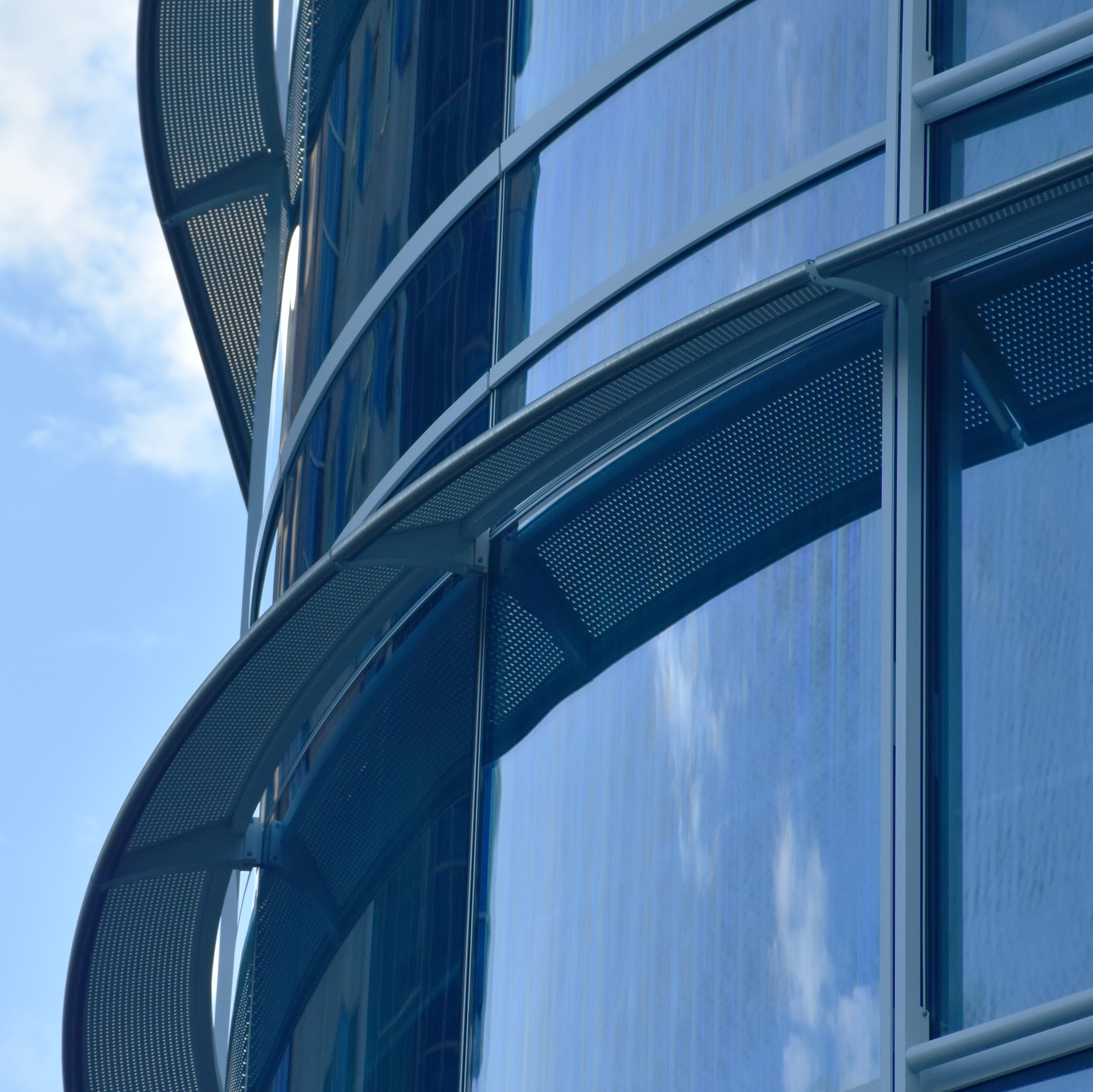
Detail of the curtain wall façade

The Salesforce Tower consists of a glass and steel curtain wall, surrounding a structural steel frame, which surrounds a reinforced concrete core. The building is enclosed in a lattice consisting of white aluminum fins and perforated sunshades, which reach out as much as two feet beyond the glass skin. The tower's silhouette is smoothly tapering off toward the top. Salesforce Tower is 61 stories tall, and covers 1,400,000 sq ft (130,000 m^{2}) of floorspace. The building's top 150 feet (46 m) above the 61st floor have been described as "largely ornamental".

The 61st floor is known as the Ohana Floor and serves as an observation deck and lounge for Salesforce employees and guests. It is made available for use by nonprofits on evenings and weekends. In 2019, the company opened public tours of the Ohana Floor once every month.

Companies involved with the project include glass manufacturer Guardian Industries, plumbing manufacturer Kohler Co., elevator manufacturer Schindler Group, engineering consultant Morrison Hershfield, and structural engineering firm Magnusson Klemencic Associates.

The footprint of Salesforce Tower rests on land fill near San Francisco's original waterfront, an area prone to soil liquefaction during earthquakes. To account for this seismic risk, the tower uses a design that is modeled to withstand the strongest earthquakes expected in the region. Its foundation includes 42 piles driven down nearly 300 feet (91 m) to bedrock and a 14-foot (4.3 m) thick foundation mat.

The Salesforce Transit Center is located directly adjacent to the building, and is connected to the park level by a bridge on the 5th floor.

=== "Day for Night" light sculpture ===
The crown of the tower features a nine-story electronic light sculpture, "Day for Night", by artist Jim Campbell. At its activation on May 21, 2018, it was considered the tallest public art piece in the world, visible from up to 30 miles away. At the time, its daily schedule began at dusk with a display of the sunset's colors, followed by low resolution videos derived from footage filmed during the day by 12 cameras in various San Francisco locations (including the Ferry Building and the Cliff House), and concluded with displaying a star constellation from midnight to sunrise. The installation went toward fulfilling the requirement of San Francisco's "Downtown Plan" that one percent of construction costs have to be set aside for public art. The animations are generated by 11,000 inward-facing LED lights on the top six floors (which are unoccupied), supported by color lighting on the three floors below them (which house building infrastructure).

By 2022, "Day for Night" was also featuring monthly "Midnight Artist Series" by other artists, and sometimes themed content for occasions such as Lunar New Year or Pride. For Halloween 2018, in response to a petition that gathered 11,000 signatures, the light installation was made to look like the Eye of Sauron. As of 2021, this has happened on every subsequent Halloween, too.

== History ==
Developer Hines Interests Limited Partnership, with a proposal by architect César Pelli of Pelli Clarke Pelli Architects, was selected as the winner of a global competition in 2007 to entitle and purchase the site. A seven-member jury of development experts assembled by the Transbay Joint Powers Authority (TJPA) selected Hines over proposals from Forest City Enterprises and architect Richard Rogers; and from Rockefeller Development Group Corp. and Skidmore, Owings & Merrill. In 2012, Boston Properties acquired a 50% stake in the project and in 2013 acquired most of Hines' remaining interest to become 95% owners of the project.

The site of the tower was in a dilapidated area, formerly used as a ground-level entrance to the San Francisco Transbay Terminal, which was demolished in 2011. The TJPA sold the parcel to Boston Properties and Hines for US$192 million, and ceremonial groundbreaking for the new tower occurred on March 27, 2013, with below-grade construction work starting in late 2013. The project is a joint venture between general contractors Clark Construction and Hathaway Dinwiddie Construction.

The development was originally contracted on spec, as Hines did not have a major tenant lease secured beforehand. On April 11, 2014, Salesforce.com announced that it signed a lease for 714,000 square feet (66,300 m^{2}) to become the building's anchor tenant. Previously known as the Transbay Tower, the building was renamed Salesforce Tower. The lease was valued at US$560 million over 15 1/2 years starting in 2017.

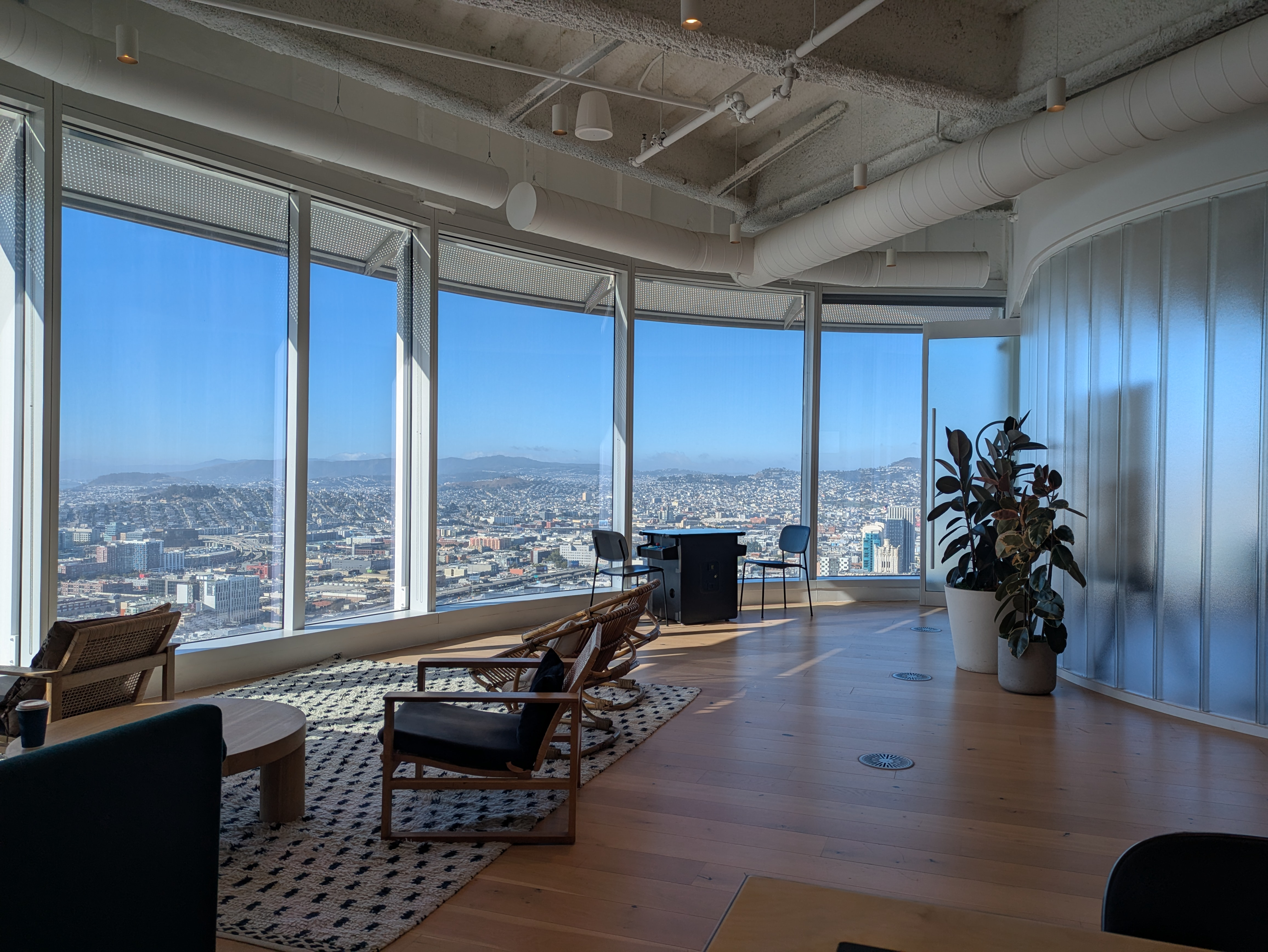
WeWork coworking space in the Salesforce Tower

The tower opened in 2018 and has 61 floors, with a decorative crown reaching 1,070 ft (326 m). The original proposal called for a 1,200-foot (370 m) tower, but the height was later reduced. The building's first tenants began moving in on January 8, 2018. Upon opening, the building was 97% leased to tenants including Salesforce, Covington & Burling, WeWork, Bain & Company, Accenture, McDermott Will & Emery and Hellman & Friedman.

In May 2019, Boston Properties bought out Hines' remaining 5% stake in the building to become the sole owner and operator.

== Critical reception and recognition ==
At the time of the building's opening in January 2018, the San Francisco Chronicle's architecture critic John King characterized it as "Immense but understated. Overwhelming yet refined. A study in thick-walled minimalism that seems to hover more than soar. All of which makes for a nuanced tower, conscientious and self-assured even as it reorients the skyline and redefines San Francisco's visual image." King also reported that "[a]rchitecture buffs already dismiss Salesforce Tower as old hat, another Clarke Pelli shaft with a tapered silhouette — just like the International Finance Centre in Hong Kong or Torre Costanera in Santiago, Chile" (the tallest building in South America). However, he defended it against such criticism, pointing out differences like the Salesforce Tower's "smooth ascent".

The Council on Tall Buildings and Urban Habitat named Salesforce Tower the "Best Tall Building Worldwide" for 2019.

In 2025, Salesforce Tower was awarded the BOMA International The Outstanding Building of the Year (TOBY) Award in the “Over 1 Million Square Feet” category, recognizing excellence in building management, operations, and sustainability.

== Gallery ==
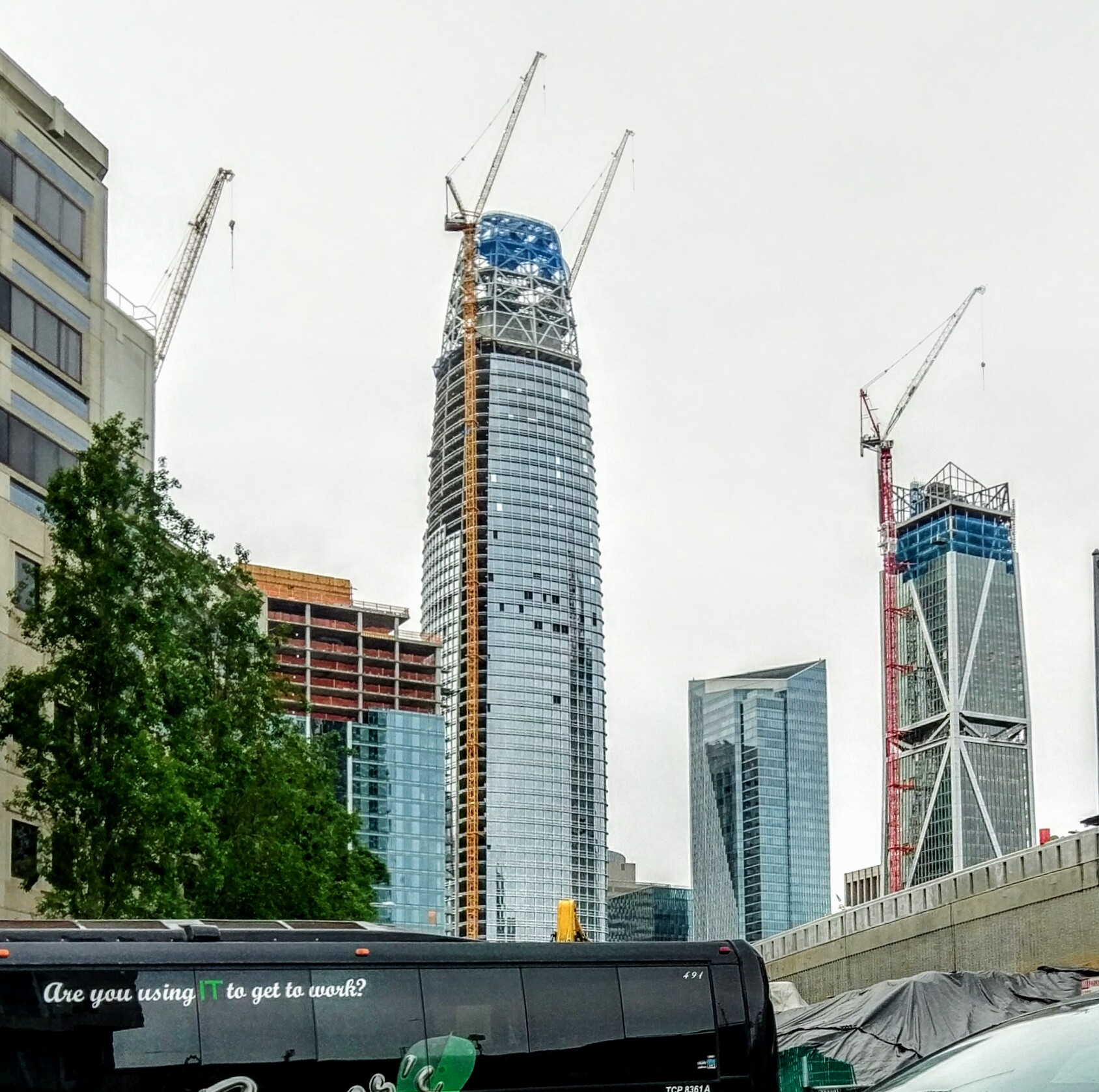
Salesforce Tower in April 2017, the day before its topping-out ceremony with 181 Fremont under construction on the right

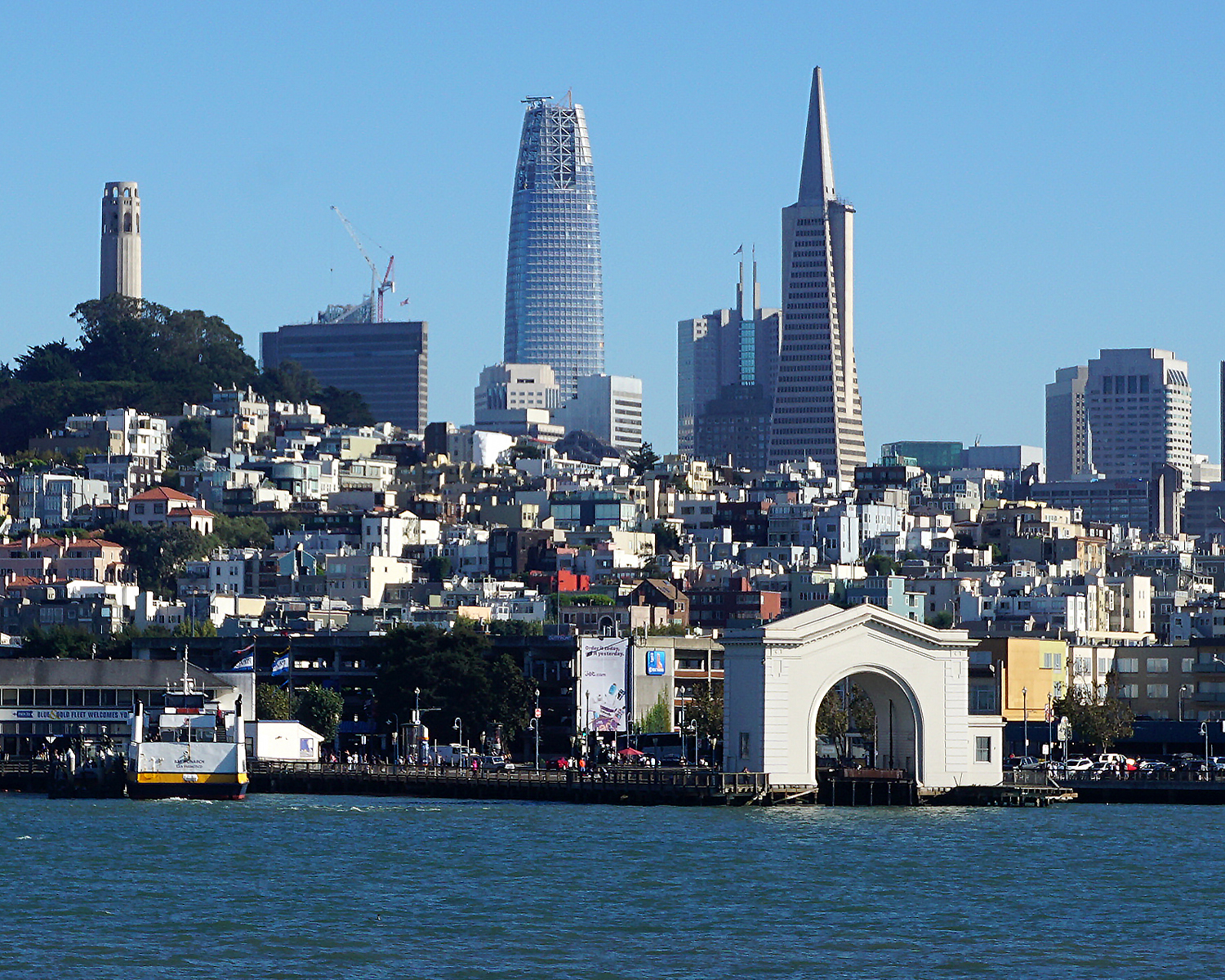
The Salesforce Tower (center-left) and the Transamerica Pyramid (center-right) with Coit Tower (left) and the Pier 43 Ferry Arch (foreground)

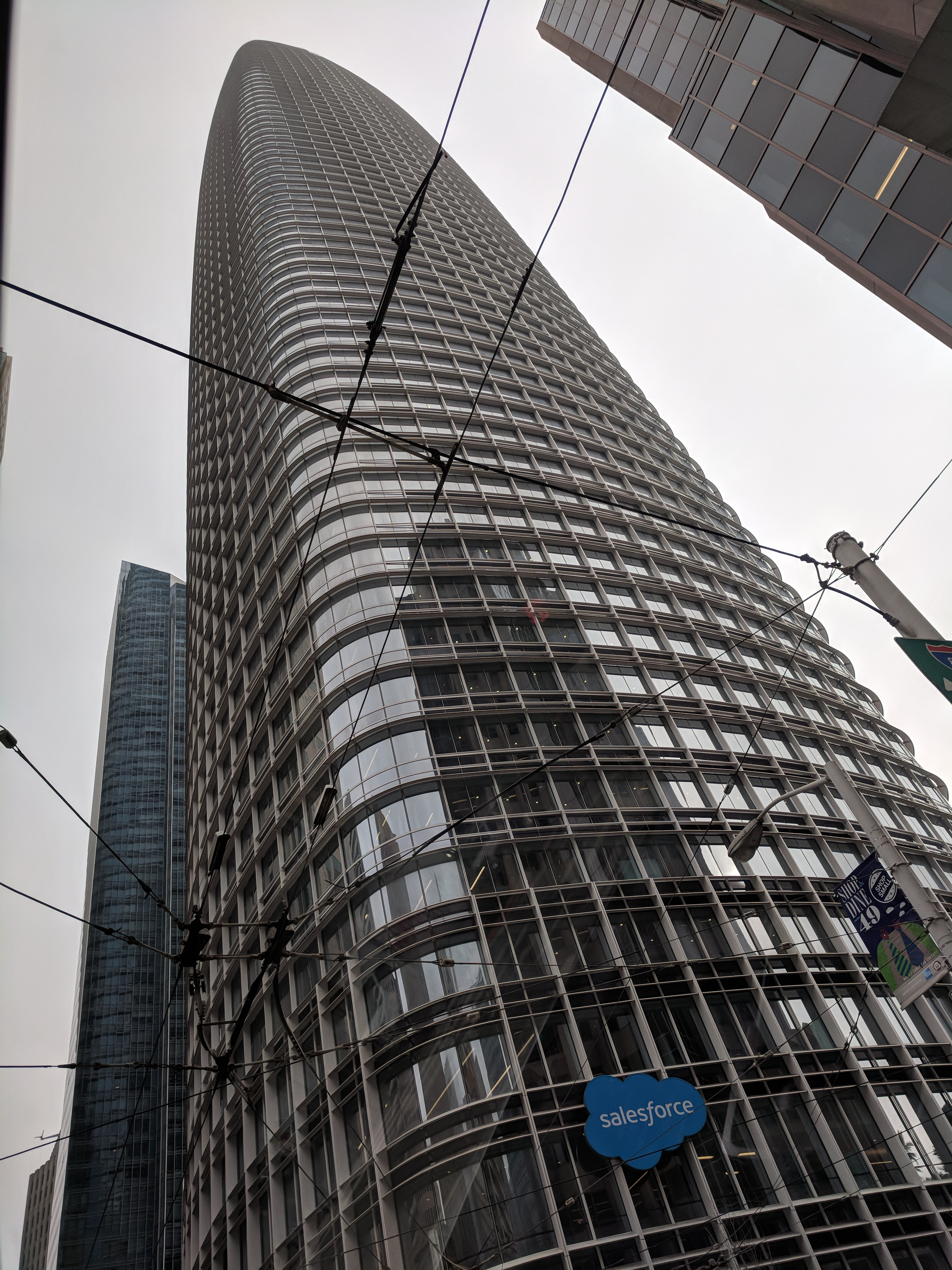
A ground-level view in late 2018 after construction was completed

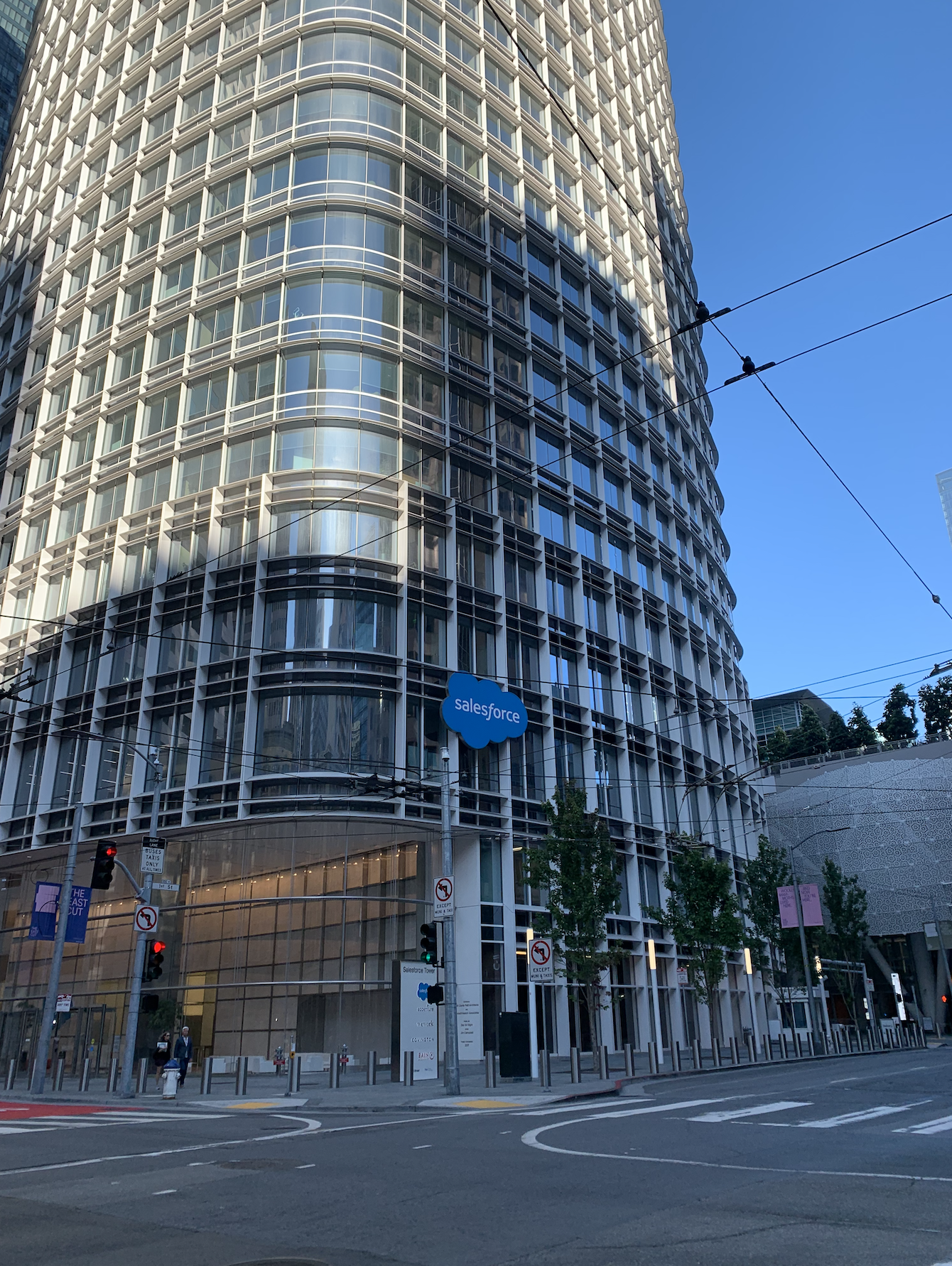
Salesforce Tower Street Level View from August 2019

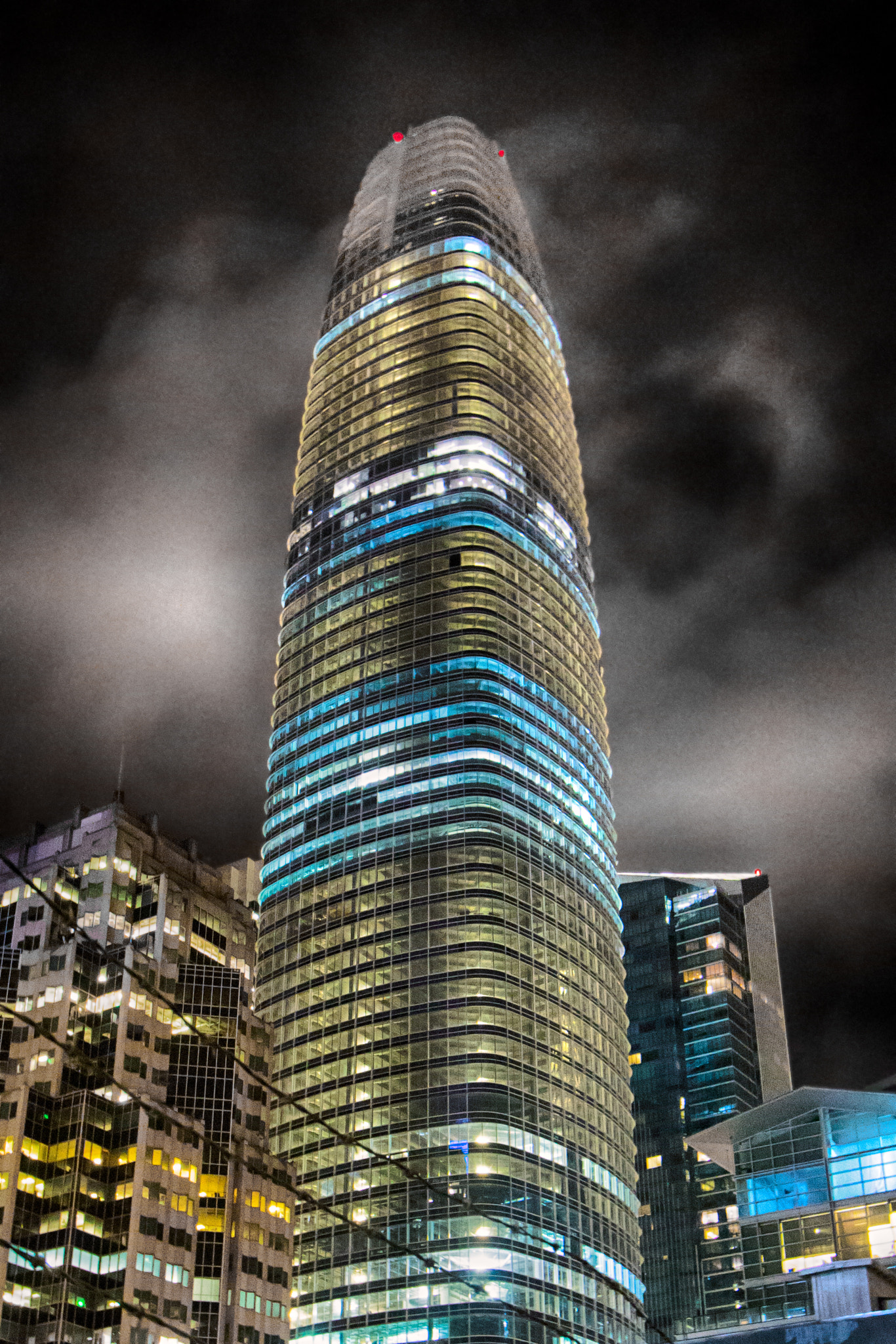
Night-time view from Salesforce Park

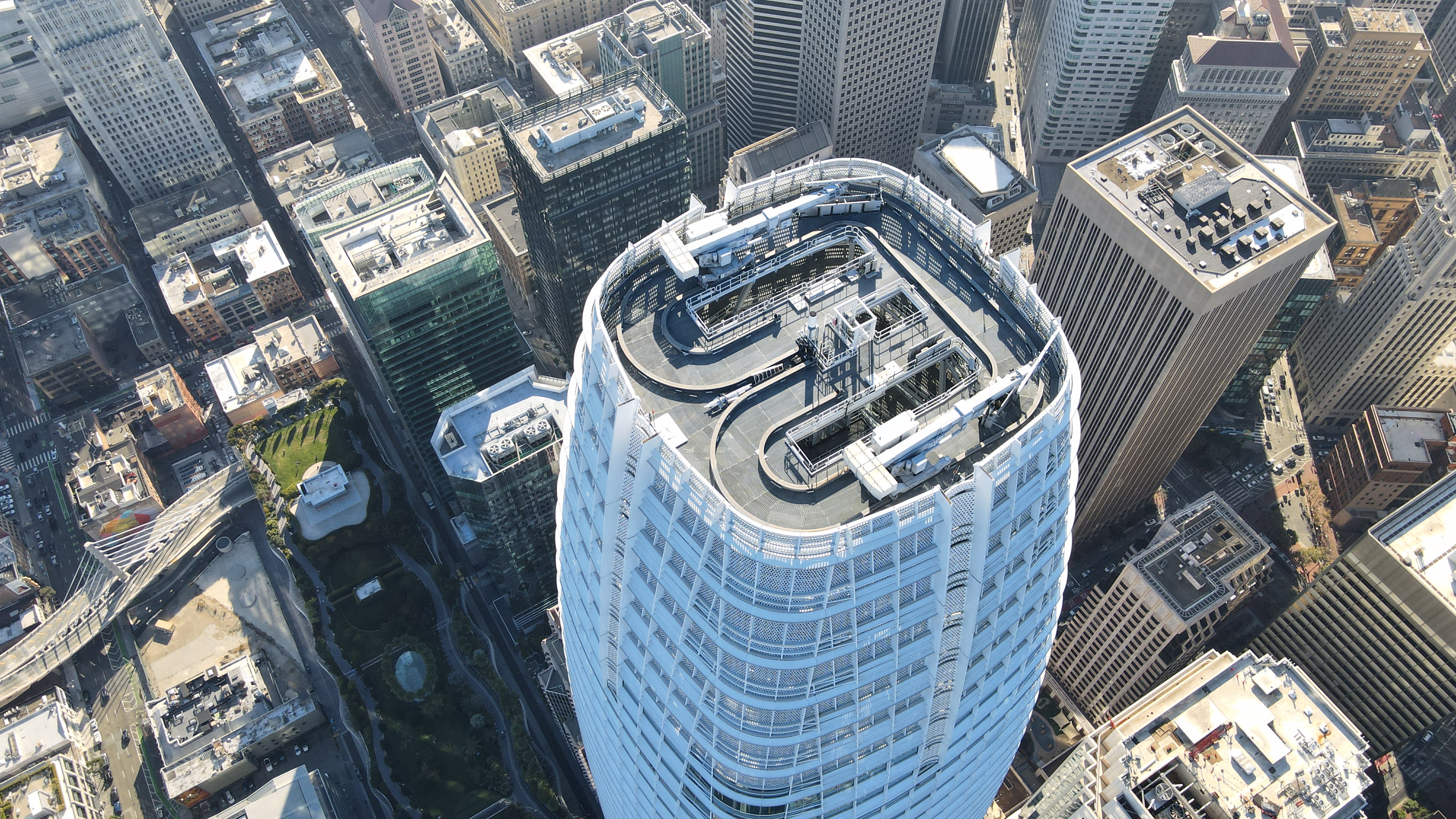
The roof of Salesforce Tower

== See also ==
- List of tallest buildings in San Francisco
- List of tallest buildings in California
- List of tallest buildings in the United States
