= 50 Beale Street =

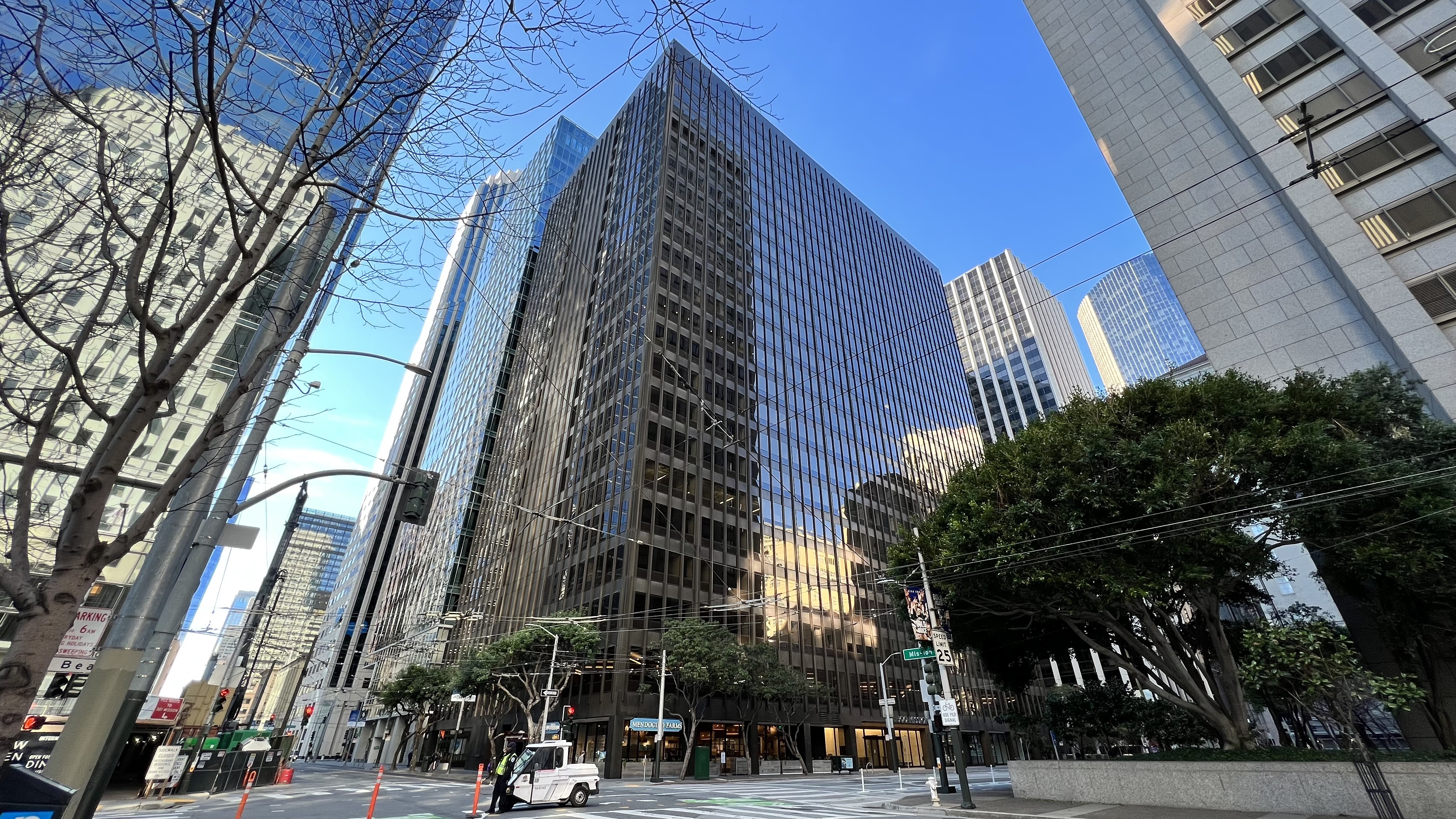
- Corner view (2022)

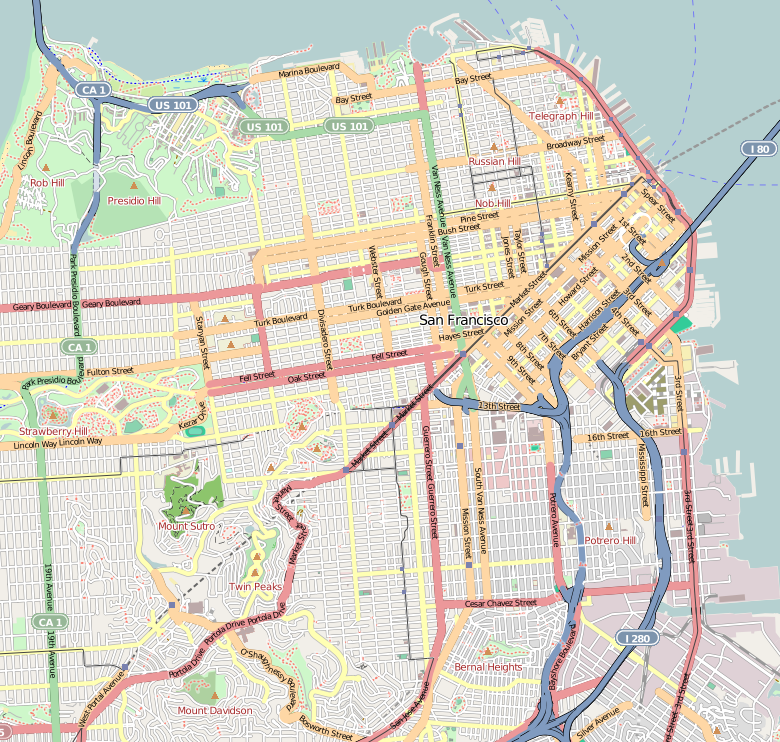
- Location within San Francisco 50 Beale Street (California) 50 Beale Street (the United States)
- Former names: Bechtel Building; Blue Shield of California Building

General information
- Type: Commercial offices
- Location: 50 Beale Street; San Francisco, California
- Coordinates: 37.7912°N 122.3965°W
- Completed: 1967
- Owner: Paramount Group, Inc.

Height
- Roof: 328 ft (100 m)

Technical details
- Floor count: 23
- Floor area: 730,136 sq ft (67,831.9 m^{2})

Design and construction
- Architect(s): Skidmore, Owings & Merrill

50 Beale Street is a 328 ft (100 m), 23-floor high-rise office building in the Financial District, San Francisco between Market Street and Mission Street. It is on the list of tallest buildings in San Francisco.

Completed in 1967, the building served as the world headquarters for Bechtel before the company moved to Reston, Virginia. The building has also served as headquarters for Blue Shield of California between 1996 and 2018. In 2006, Blue Shield renewed its lease and acquired naming rights to the building. The building has formerly been known as the Bechtel Building and subsequently the Blue Shield of California Building.

Broadway Partners acquired the building in 2007. A joint venture of The Rockefeller Group and Mitsubishi Estate New York acquired the building in September 2012. The building was sold to Paramount Group, Inc. for approximately US$395 million in September 2014.

The building features a 1920 railcar used by Steve Bechtel. The private railcar was the Bechtel family home in the 1920s and was the living quarters of the Bechtels when constructing the Hoover Dam.

== Tenants ==
- Bechtel
- Blue Shield of California
- Glassdoor
- Instacart
- VerticalResponse
- Zenefits
- San Francisco Health Authority/San Francisco Health Plan
