= 820 Olive =

825 S Hill
- Location within the Los Angeles metropolitan area
- Alternative names: 825 South Hill

General information
- Type: Retail, Residential
- Architectural style: Modern
- Location: 820 S. Olive St. Los Angeles, California
- Coordinates: 34.0445°N 118.2565°W
- Construction started: 2016
- Completed: 2019
- Cost: $500 Million
- Owner: Onni Group
- Operator: Onni Group

Height
- Architectural: 563 ft (171.6 m)
- Tip: 563 ft (171.6 m)

Technical details
- Material: Concrete
- Floor count: 49; 4 below ground
- Floor area: 529,083 sq ft (49,153.4 m^{2})

Design and construction
- Architect: Chris Dikeakos Architects
- Developer: Onni Group
- Main contractor: Onni Group

Website
- https://www.825southhilldtla.com/

820 Olive or 825 South Hill, is a residential and retail tower in downtown Los Angeles, California that is located within walking distance from Staples Center, L.A. Live, and the Broadway. It was developed by Onni Group and designed by Chris Dikeakos Architects. Construction of the building was started in July 2016 and completed in February 2019 with an overall height of 563 ft (171.6 m). It has 49 floors. At the time of its completion, it became the tallest residential tower in California. It was then surpassed by the 56 floors, 647 ft (197.2 m) tall Metropolis Tower D in December 2019.

== History ==
The building site was previously used as a parking lot.

Part of the site, at the southwest corner of Eighth and Hill was the location of the RKO Hillstreet Theatre, 801 S. Hill St., opened 1922, architect G. Albert Lansburgh, closed 1963, demolished 1965.

In 2014, Onni Group announced that they would build a residential skyscraper on the site. On 12 January 2016, the developer obtained grading and shoring permits from the City of Los Angeles Department of Building and Safety to build the building on the site. The project later groundbroke in February 2016. It then followed by foundation works in July of that year. The building topped out in 2018. Following the completion of its interior works, 820 Olive opened on 15 February 2019. It has a total of 516 residential units and more than 5,000 sq ft (460 m^{2}) of retail.

== See also ==
- List of tallest buildings in Los Angeles
- List of tallest buildings in California
