= Olympic and Hill =

Olympic + Hill
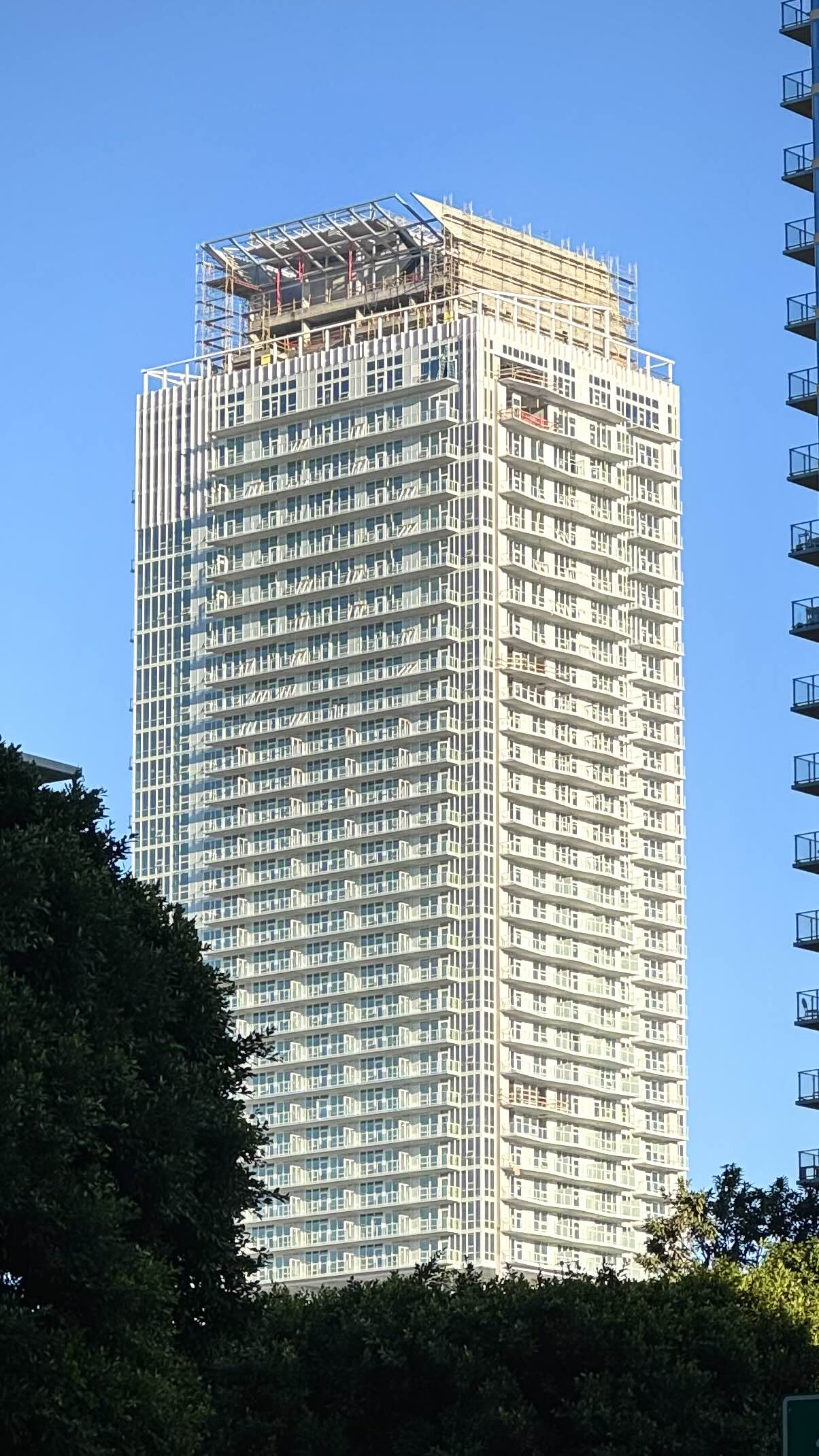
- The tower under construction in November 2024
- Interactive map of the Olympic + Hill area
- Alternative names: 230 W. Olympic Boulevard, 1000 S. Hill Street

General information
- Type: Retail, Residential
- Architectural style: Modern
- Location: 1000 S. Hill St. Los Angeles, California
- Coordinates: 34.0410°N 118.2585°W
- Construction started: June 2022
- Completed: 2025
- Owner: Onni Group
- Management: Onni Group

Height
- Architectural: 590 ft (179.8 m)
- Tip: 590 ft (179.8 m)

Technical details
- Material: Glass and Steel
- Floor count: 54; 7 below ground
- Floor area: 657,943 square feet (61,124.9 m^{2})

Design and construction
- Architect: Chris Dikeakos Architects / IBI Group
- Developer: IBI Group
- Main contractor: Onni Group

Olympic + Hill is a residential and retail tower under construction in downtown Los Angeles, California that is located within walking distance from Crypto.com Arena, L.A. Live, and Broadway district. It is being developed by Onni Group and designed by IBI Group.

== History ==
Construction of the building was started in June 2022. Overall 54 floor count designed height of 590 ft (179.8 m). The building site on the southwest corner of S. Hill Street and W. Olympic Boulevard was previously used as a parking lot. A thirty-month construction timeline. Completion by 2025. Shortly after construction began it was revealed the original building height was shortened from 760 ft (231.6 m) to 590 ft (179.8 m). Along with the building getting shortened from 60 stories to 54 stories.

== See also ==
- List of tallest buildings in Los Angeles
- List of tallest buildings in California
