= ARCO Tower (Los Angeles) =

Skyscraper in Los Angeles

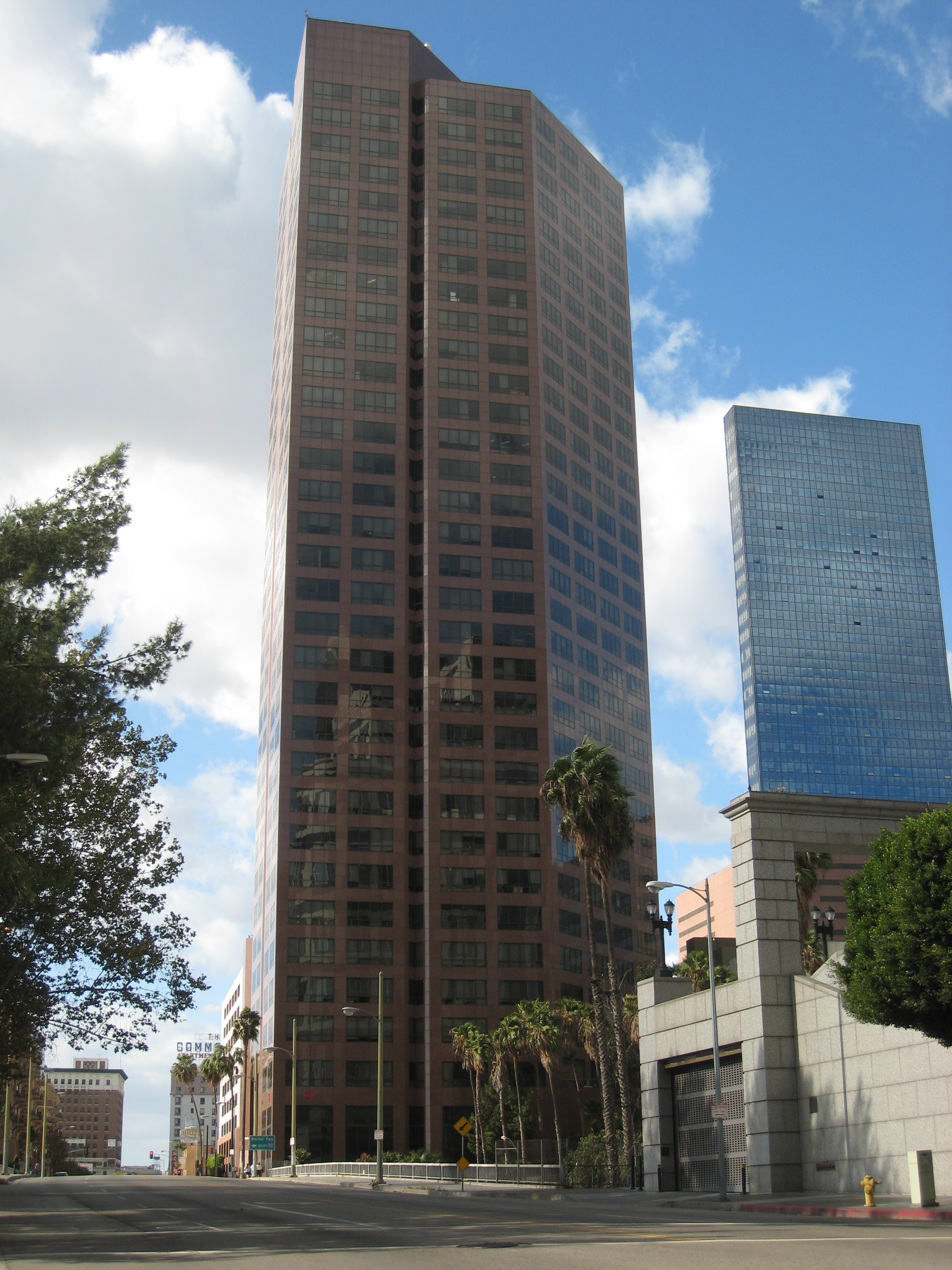
- Interactive map of the ARCO Tower area
- Alternative names: 1055 West Seventh

General information
- Type: Commercial offices
- Location: 1055 West Seventh Street; Los Angeles, California
- Coordinates: 34.0507°N 118.2632°W
- Construction started: 1988
- Completed: 1989
- Owner: Jose Varela

Height
- Roof: 140.82 m (462.0 ft)

Technical details
- Floor count: 33
- Floor area: 672,744 sq ft (62,500.0 m^{2})

Design and construction
- Architect: Gin Wong Associates
- Developer: Transpacific Development Company
- Structural engineer: John A. Martin & Associates
- Main contractor: Turner Construction

ARCO Tower (currently known as 1055 West Seventh) is a high-rise office building located at 1055 West Seventh Street in Los Angeles, California.

It has 33 stories and stands at a height of 141 m (463 ft), making it the 32nd tallest building in Los Angeles. Located in Central City West, It has a prominent position in the local skyline, as it is across the 110 (Harbor) Freeway from the majority of the skyscrapers in downtown Los Angeles and the only other nearby building taller than it is 1100 Wilshire. The building has a floor area of 205,054 m^{2} and was designed by Gin Wong Associates. Construction of the building began in 1988 and was completed in 1989. The building was one of three ARCO Towers within blocks of each other in Los Angeles when constructed. It changed its name to 1055 West Seventh in 1998, due to ARCO relocating. By 2013, healthcare provider LA Care had its headquarters in the building.

In 2023, it was announced that the tower would be redeveloped as 691 apartments, due to the struggling office market in downtown Los Angeles.

== See also ==
- List of tallest buildings in Los Angeles
