= City House and the Olympic =

- Interactive map of the City House and the Olympic area

General information
- Status: Never built
- Type: Residential condominium
- Architectural style: Modernism
- Location: South Grand Avenue & West Olympic Boulevard; Los Angeles, California
- Coordinates: 34.04265°N 118.26066°W

Height
- Height: The Olympic 173 m (568 ft); City House 229 m (751 ft)

Technical details
- Floor count: The Olympic 49; City House 60

Design and construction
- Architect: Robertson Partners
- Developer: The Titan Organization

Other information
- Number of units: The Olympic 149; City House 182

City House and The Olympic is a cancelled residential skyscraper complex proposed for the southeast corner of South Grand Avenue and West Olympic Boulevard in Los Angeles, California. It was designed by Robertson Partners, and developed by The Titan Organization. City House would have had 60 floors and been 229 m (751 ft) in height, and the Olympic would have had 50 floors and been 173 m (568 ft) tall.

== See also ==
- List of tallest buildings in Los Angeles
