= Central City West, Los Angeles =

Central City West
- Neighborhood of Los Angeles
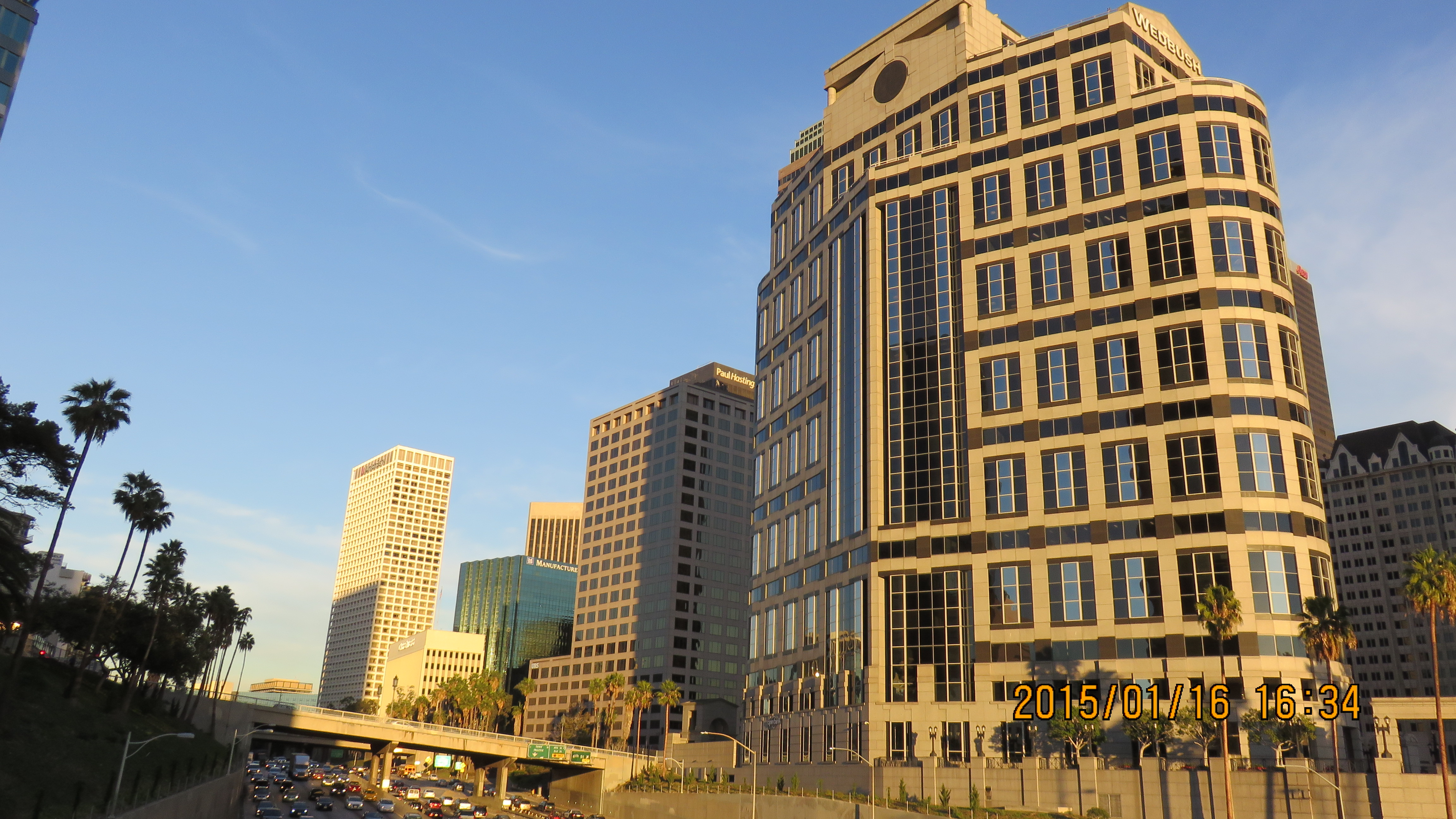
- Central City West

- Location within Central Los Angeles
- Coordinates: 34°02′47″N 118°16′21″W
- Country: United States
- State: California
- County: Los Angeles
- City: Los Angeles
- Time zone: Pacific
- Zip Code: 90017
- Area code: 213

Central City West, sometimes known as City West or The West Bank, is a neighborhood in Downtown Los Angeles.

== History ==
One of the earliest uses of the name "Central City West" was in 1986, when the city exempted the area from a slow-growth initiative. In 1987, the Los Angeles Times reported that the "bet on the wrong side of the Harbor Freeway" was paying off with the construction of new office towers, including the $170 million Transpacific Center. The area was now being referred "The West Bank" and the Los Angeles Times noted that Asian financing was behind the highrise construction in the neighborhood. In October 1988, consultants were hired to develop a strategy to create an identifiable community out of a "confused no-man's land between the Harbor Freeway and the Westlake District". Consultants stated that the area was a "twin" to downtown, rather than a "challenge".

In 2007, developer Geoff Palmer was attracting criticism for his apartment complexes because they did not include a low-income housing component. In 2006, he had applied for the Piero II, and requested that the City waive the affordable housing requirements. The City denied the waiver and Palmer sued the city (Palmer/Sixth Street Properties LP v. City of Los Angeles), claiming the affordable housing zoning requirements in the Central City West specific plan violated the Costa-Hawkins Act. In 2009, Palmer won his case when the California Court of Appeal ruled that "as applied to Palmer's proposed project, the affordable housing ordinance conflicts with and is preempted by the vacancy decontrol provisions of the Costa-Hawkins Rental Housing Act."

In 2006, the Los Angeles Times reported that with Dreamgirls and Numb3rs filming at Los Angeles Center Studios, the city’s decades-old vision for City West was finally being fulfilled. In 2007, an economic downturn halted construction in the area, but by 2011, construction of apartment buildings in the neighborhood resumed.

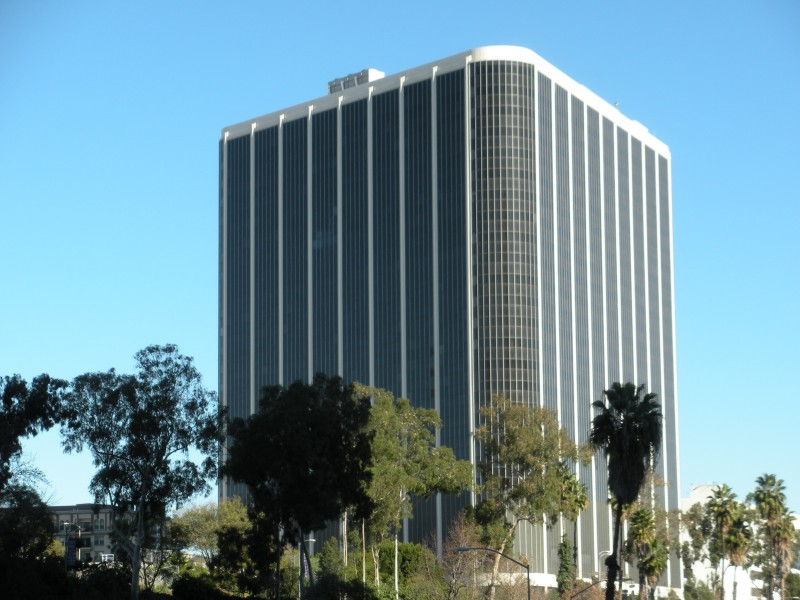
Beaudry Center 333 S. Beaudry

== Geography ==
According to the Los Angeles Times, Central City West is a 465-acre area downtown designed as a "self-contained urban village." It is bounded by the Harbor Freeway on the east, the Hollywood Freeway on the north and Olympic Boulevard on the south. The western border consists of Glendale Boulevard, Whitmer Street, Union Street, and Albany Street.

== Notable Buildings ==
- Beaudry Center - 333 S. Beaudry. LAUSD headquarters
- Arco Tower - 1055 W. 7th Street
- 1100 Wilshire - 2nd tallest residential building in Southern California.
- Los Angeles Center Studios - a 20-acre film production facility.
