= Olympia Towers (Los Angeles) =

Retail and residential development in Los Angeles, California

- Location within the Los Angeles metropolitan area

General information
- Type: Retail, Hotels and Residential
- Location: 1025 W. Olympic Blvd. Los Angeles, California
- Coordinates: 34°04′44″N 118°26′00″W
- Cost: $1 billion
- Owner: City Century
- Management: Sheng Long Group

Technical details
- Floor count: 65 below ground
- Floor area: 155,000 Sq/ft

Design and construction
- Architect: Skidmore, Owings & Merrill Patterns
- Developer: Sheng Long Group

Olympia Towers, is a proposed development consisting of a three-tower residential and retail complex in Downtown Los Angeles, California, immediately north of Crypto.com Arena, L.A. Live and the Los Angeles Convention Center.

The Olympia Towers development is currently proposed as three towers. Olympia Tower I is currently proposed as 65 floors of residential, Olympia Tower II as 53 and Olympia Tower III as 43. The site bordering the 110 Harbor Freeway is currently a parking lot.

== See also ==
- List of tallest buildings in Los Angeles
