= 1999 Avenue of the Stars =

39-story, 534-foot skyscraper in Century City, Los Angeles, California

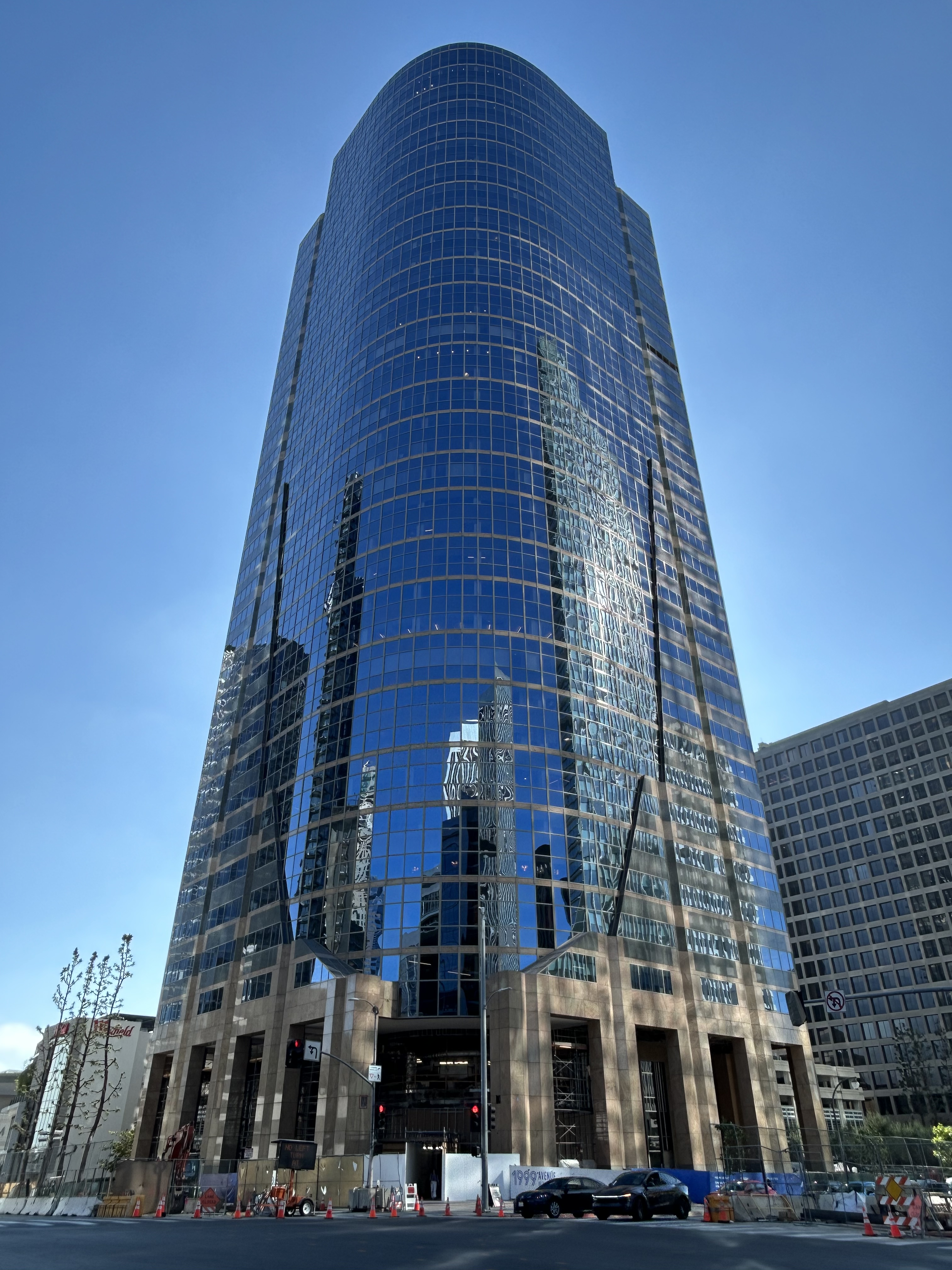
- 1999 Avenue of the Stars, 2026.
- Interactive map of the 1999 Avenue of the Stars area

General information
- Status: Completed
- Type: Commercial offices
- Architectural style: Postmodern
- Location: 1999 Avenue of the Stars; Century City, Los Angeles, California
- Coordinates: 34.0587°N 118.4169°W
- Construction started: 1989
- Completed: 1990
- Operator: EQ Office

Height
- Roof: 163 m (535 ft)

Technical details
- Floor count: 39
- Floor area: 824,106 sq ft (76,562.0 m^{2})
- Lifts/elevators: 20

Design and construction
- Architect: Johnson Fain
- Structural engineer: Nabih Youssef Associates
- Main contractor: Hathaway Dinwiddie Construction Company

1999 Avenue of the Stars, formerly SunAmerica Center, and before that, AIG–SunAmerica Center, is a 39-story, 534-foot (163 m) skyscraper in Century City, Los Angeles, California. The tower was completed in 1990. Designed by Johnson Fain, It is the twenty sixth-tallest building in Los Angeles and the fifth-tallest building in Century City. On-site parking is available in an eight-level attached garage.

SunAmerica Center received the BOMA International 2001/2002 Office Building of the Year Award.

In late March 2009, all visible AIG logos were removed from the building

== Tenants ==
- Darko Entertainment
- Moelis & Company
- Goldman Sachs
- Morgan Stanley
- Credit Suisse
- Bain & Company
- Lazard
- Bloomberg L.P.
- Consulate General of the United Arab Emirates
- AECOM
- Simpson Thacher & Bartlett
- UBS

== Gallery ==
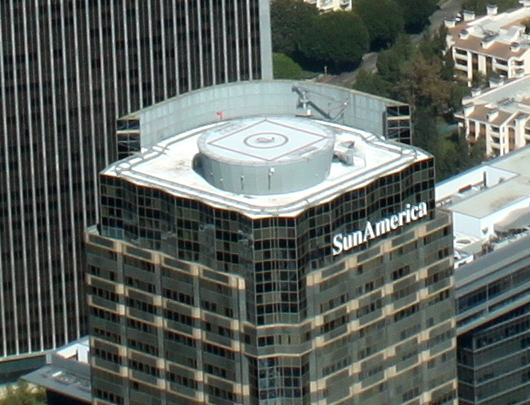
Rooftop helipad

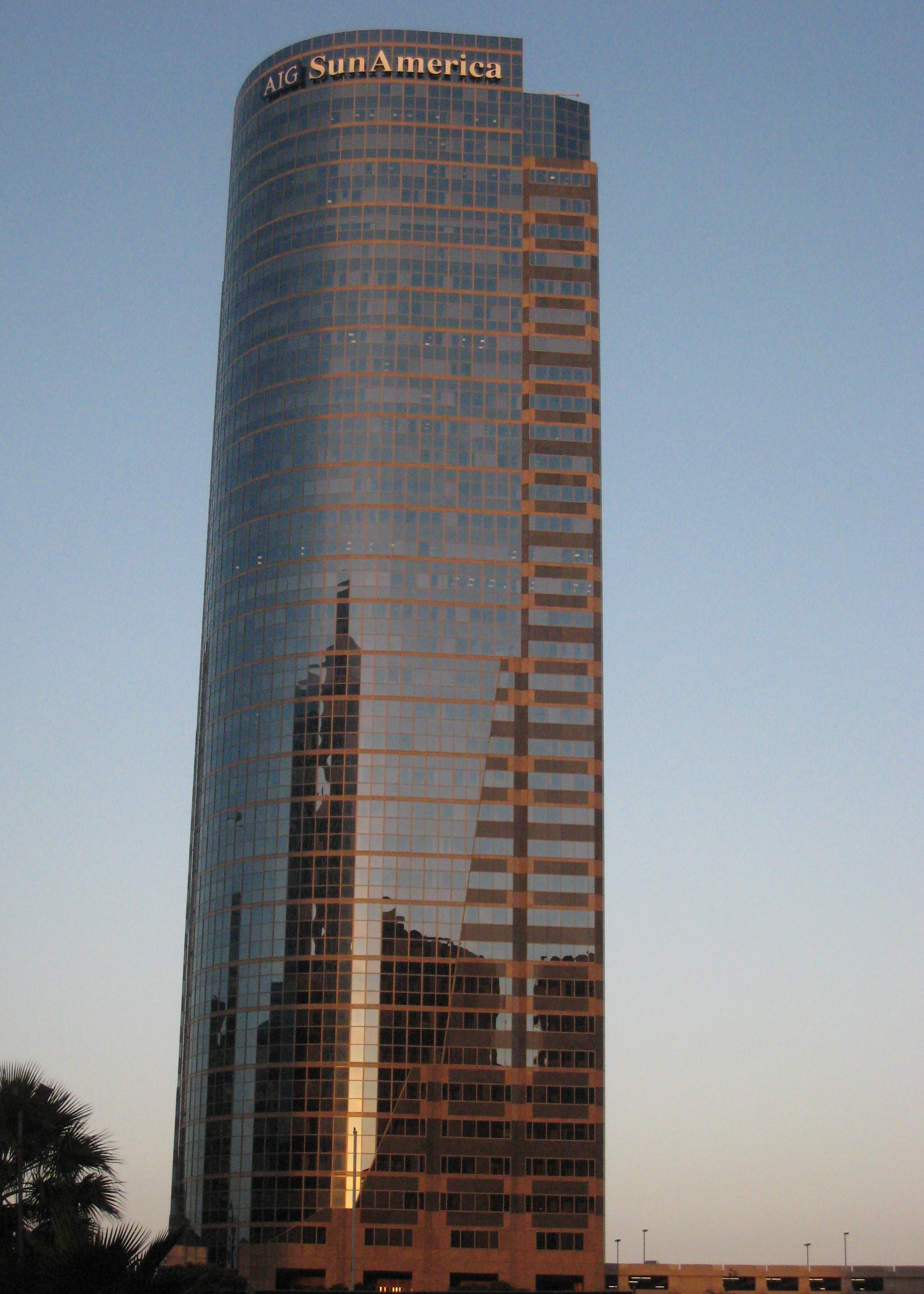
1999 Avenue of the Stars in 2008.

== See also ==
- List of tallest buildings in Los Angeles
- List of tallest buildings in California
