= Circa Complex =

Circa
- Location within Los Angeles
- Former names: Circa LA; Circa Twin Towers; Circa Complex

General information
- Type: Retail and Residential
- Location: 1200 S. Figueroa St. Los Angeles, California
- Coordinates: 34°02′35″N 118°16′02″W
- Construction started: 2016
- Completed: 2018
- Cost: $500 Million

Height
- Architectural: 121.9 m (400 ft)
- Top floor: 121.9 m (400 ft)

Technical details
- Floor count: 35; 2 below ground
- Floor area: 2 Million Sq/ft
- Lifts/elevators: 35

Design and construction
- Architects: Harley Ellis Deveraux; Hanson LA
- Developer: Jamison Services; Hankey Capitol
- Main contractor: Wilshire Construction Group

Other information
- Public transit access: Pico

Circa, formerly 1200 Figueroa, is a twin tower 400-foot (121.9 m) skyscraper complex at 1200 Figueroa Street in downtown Los Angeles, California.

== Ownership ==
The developer is Hankey Investment Group. The complex is adjacent to the Pico/Chick Hearn Station of LA's Metro rail public transit station.

== History ==
The site was a vacant parking lot used by Staples Center patrons in the South Park neighborhood of Downtown Los Angeles. Construction began in 2015.

The west facing front of the building features large LED screens facing Staples Center and LA Live entertainment district. Circa has added 48,000 sq ft of retail space. The development is part of a trio of buildings currently under construction allowed to add giant video advert screens facing Figueroa Ave. Along with Oceanwide Plaza Towers and the Luxe Development.

In 2018, the 648 apartment complex topped off and move ins began October 2018.

== See also ==
- List of tallest buildings in Los Angeles
