= AT&T Madison Complex Tandem Office =

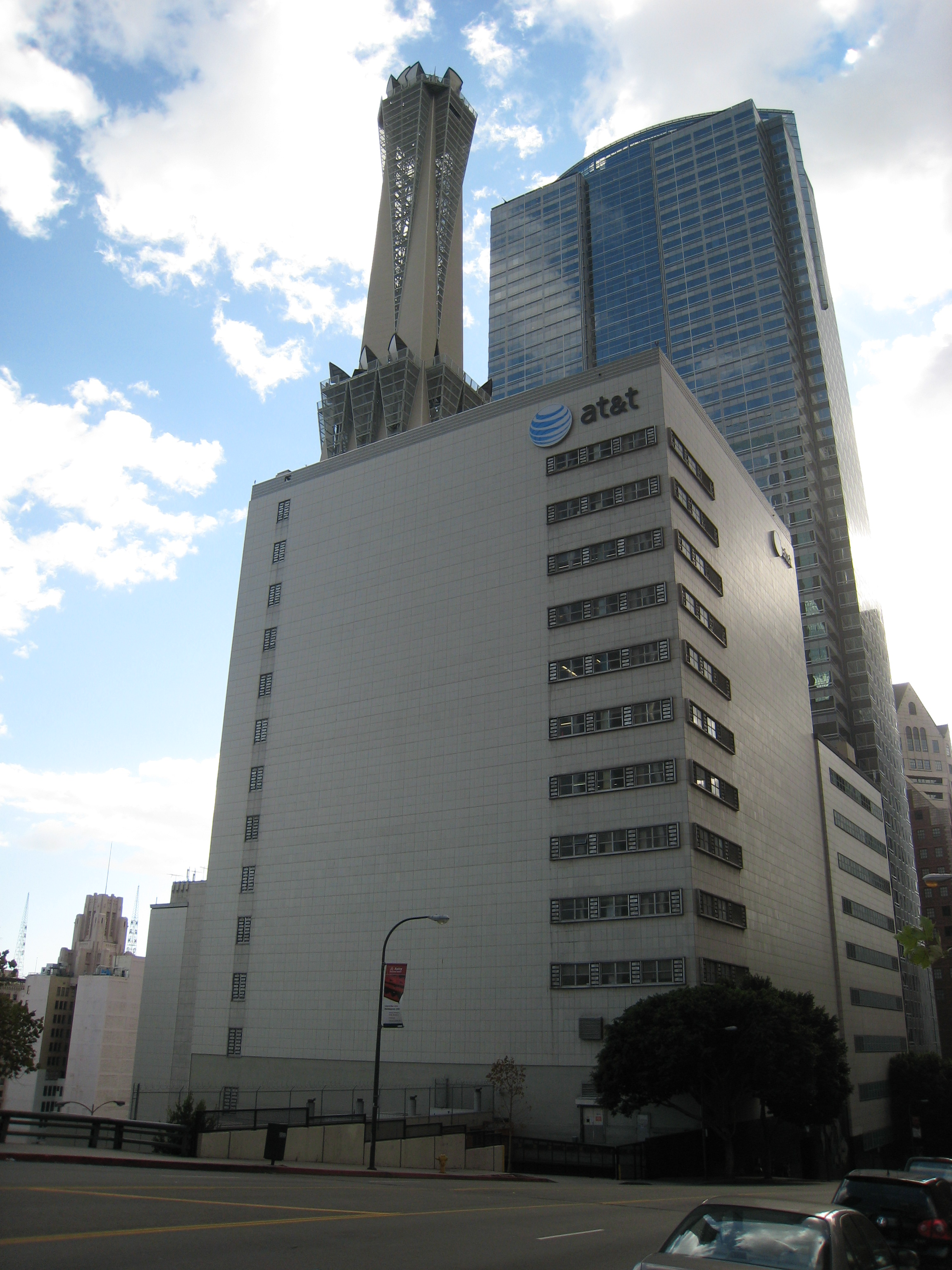
- Interactive map of the AT&T Madison Complex Tandem Office area
- Alternative names: AT&T Switching Center; PacBell Tower; Pacific Telephone Tower; SBC Building; SBC Communications Switching Station

General information
- Type: Commercial offices Switching station
- Location: 420 South Grand Avenue; Los Angeles, California
- Coordinates: 34.050750°N 118.252614°W
- Completed: 1961
- Owner: AT&T

Height
- Antenna spire: 136.55 m (448.0 ft)
- Roof: 79 m (259 ft)

Technical details
- Floor count: 17

Design and construction
- Architects: John B. Parkinson; Donald D. Parkinson

The AT&T Madison Complex Tandem Office is a 17-story, 79 m (259 ft) building in Los Angeles, California, completed in 1961. With its microwave tower, used through 1993, bringing the overall height to 137 m (449 ft), it is the 47th tallest building in Los Angeles. The building serves 1.3 million phone lines in area code 213, and other Los Angeles area codes, for foreign long-distance calling.

The site plays host to technology used in the NSA's Fairview surveillance program.

== See also ==
- List of tallest buildings in Los Angeles
