= Figueroa Eight =

Residential skyscraper in Los Angeles

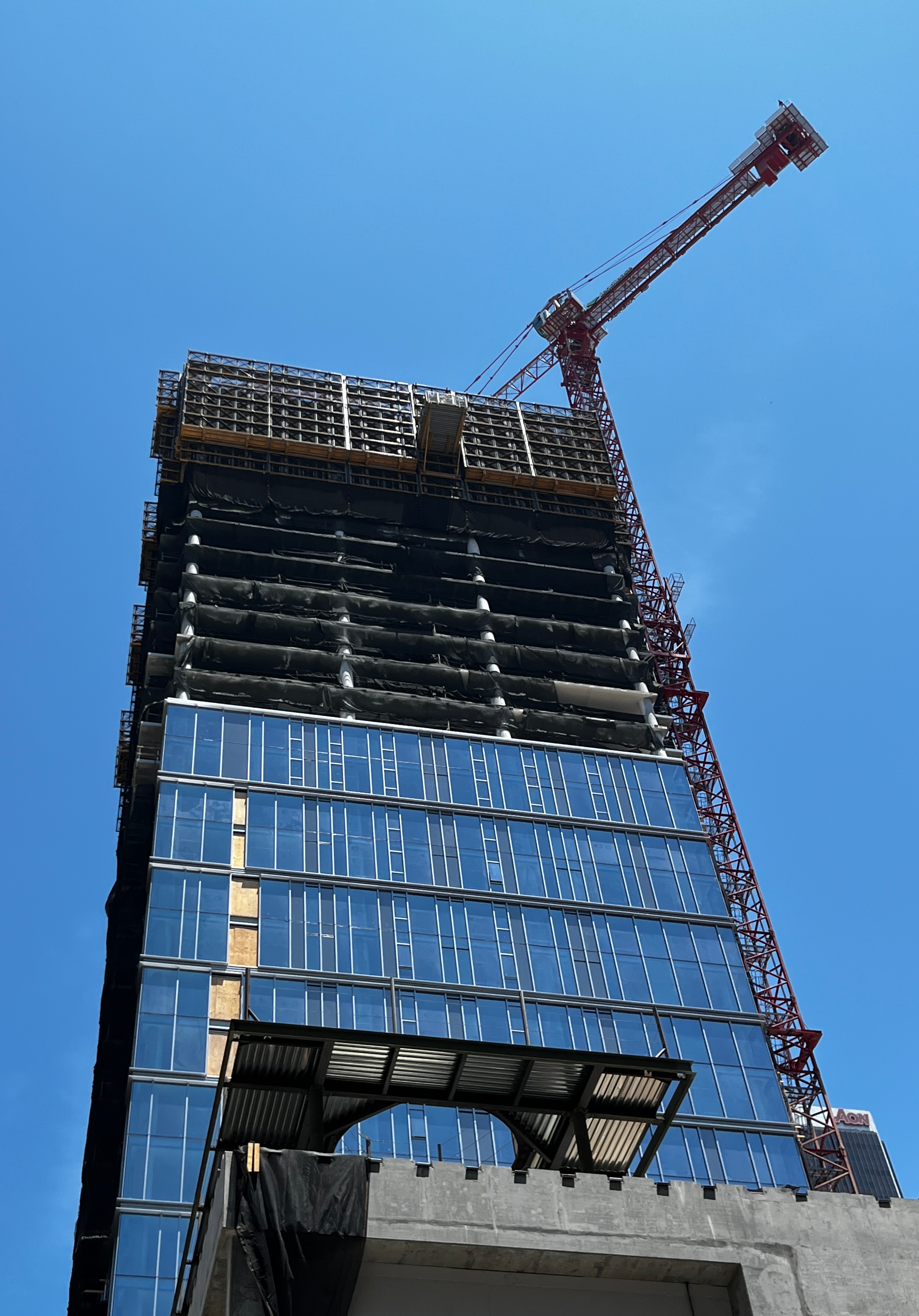
- Figueroa Eight under construction in July 2022

General information
- Status: Completed
- Architectural style: Contemporary modern
- Location: 744 S Figueroa Street; Los Angeles, California; United States
- Coordinates: 34°02′53″N 118°15′38″W
- Year built: 2020–2024
- Groundbreaking: February 2020
- Topped-out: October 7, 2022
- Opened: March 14, 2024
- Owner: Mitsui Fudosan

Height
- Height: 530 feet (160 m)

Technical details
- Floor count: 42
- Floor area: 424,489 square feet (39,436.3 m^{2})

Design and construction
- Architecture firm: Johnson Fain
- Developer: Mitsui Fudosan
- Main contractor: Lendlease

Figueroa Eight is a 530 foot (160 m)-tall residential skyscraper in Downtown Los Angeles, California. Figueroa Eight is owned by Japanese real estate developer Mitsui Fudosan. The building broke ground in February 2020 and topped out in October 2022. Figueroa Eight is one of the tallest buildings in Los Angeles.

== History ==
Mitsui Fudosan, a Japanese real estate development firm, acquired a parking lot at 744 S Figueroa Street in the 1980s. In the 1990s, the company planned to construct an office tower at the site but did not go through with its plans. In 2016, Mitsui announced plans to build a residential high-rise on the plot; the project was initially titled Eighth & Figueroa. The proposal called for 436 residential units and 11,000 square feet (1,000 m^{2}) of retail space. In 2018, a city environmental impact assessment caused the proposed building's size to be scaled back 12%. New plans called for 7,493 square feet (696.1 m^{2}) of retail space and 438 residential units. The building's height was increased from 501 feet (153 m) to 530 feet (160 m) for mechanical space at the top of the building.

In February 2020, officials broke ground on the project. Crews cleared the site of its parking lot before beginning construction at a later date. Australian multinational construction company Lendlease was selected as the project's contractor. In March 2021, a crane arrived on the site and vertical construction began. On October 7, 2022, officials announced the topping out of the building. In November 2023, Mitsui began leasing units with an expected move-in date in early 2024. Mitsui marked the building's completion with a dedication ceremony on March 14, 2024.

== Architecture ==
Los Angeles-based architecture firm Johnson Fain designed Figueroa Eight in the contemporary modern style. The residential tower sits atop a podium that includes retail space on the first floor and a parking garage. Both the podium and the tower are covered with glass curtain walls. The building's top-floor crown is illuminated with LED lights. Houston-based firm Rottet Studio oversaw Figueroa Eight's interior design.

At 530 feet (160 m) tall, Figueroa Eight is one of the tallest buildings in Los Angeles. Its floor space totals 424,489 square feet (39,436.3 m^{2}) with 7,500 square feet (700 m^{2}) dedicated to retail.
