= The Beaudry =

- Location within the Los Angeles metropolitan area

General information
- Type: Residential
- Architectural style: Modern
- Location: 960 W. 7th Street. Los Angeles, California
- Coordinates: 34.049067°N 118.261843°W
- Construction started: 2020
- Completed: 2023
- Owner: Brookfield Properties
- Operator: Brookfield Properties

Height
- Architectural: 695 ft (211.8 m)
- Tip: 695 ft (211.8 m)

Technical details
- Material: Glass and Steel
- Floor count: 64; 7 below ground
- Floor area: 791,843 square feet (73,564.6 m^{2})

Design and construction
- Architect: Marmol Radziner LARGE Architecture
- Developer: Brookfield Properties
- Structural engineer: Magnusson Klemencic Associates
- Main contractor: Brookfield Properties

Website
- beaudrydtla.com

The Beaudry is a residential tower in downtown Los Angeles, California that is located within FIGat7th shopping mall. It was developed by Brookfield Properties and designed by architects Marmol Radziner and LARGE Architecture. The tower is named after former 19th century Los Angeles mayor, Prudent Beaudry.

== History ==
Construction of the building started in 2020 with an overall height of 695 ft (211.8 m) and a 64-floor count. When completed in 2023, it became the tallest residential tower in Los Angeles and the tallest residential tower in California. It surpassed the 58 floors 647 ft (197.2 m) Millennium Tower in San Francisco and 820 Olive Tower 637 ft (194.2 m) in Los Angeles. The building site was previously a vacant lot. The tower has 785 apartment units.

== Key information ==
- It connects directly underground to the nearby 7th Street/Metro Center station
- It is currently the 12th tallest building in Los Angeles and the 16th tallest building in California, tied with the 345 California Center in San Francisco

== See also ==
- List of tallest buildings in Los Angeles
- List of tallest buildings in California
