= TCW Tower =

37-story (517.0 ft) skyscraper in Los Angeles, California

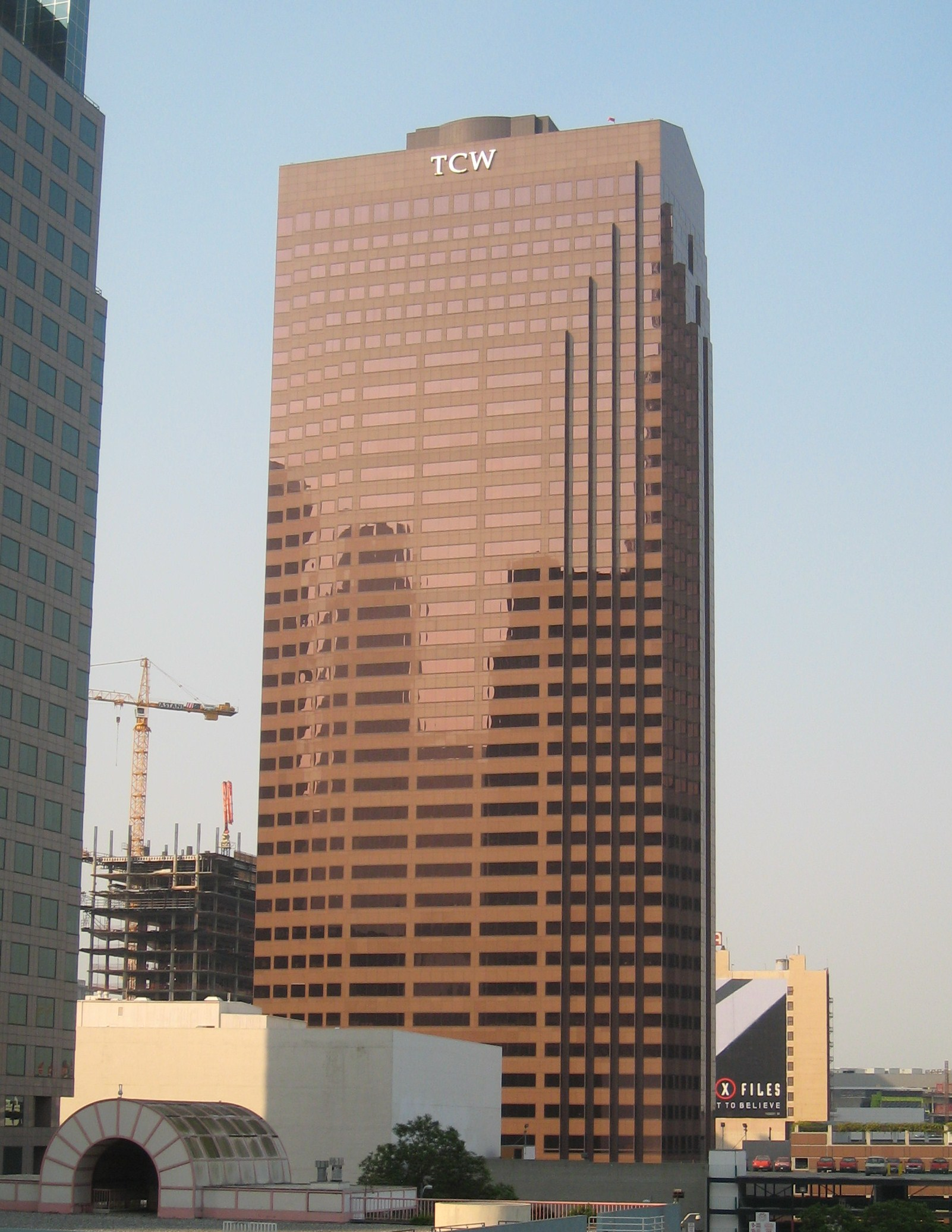
- TCW Tower in Los Angeles, California
- Interactive map of the TCW Tower area
- Alternative names: Trust Company of the West Tower

General information
- Status: Completed
- Type: Commercial Offices
- Location: 865 South Figueroa Street; Los Angeles, California
- Coordinates: 34.04667°N 118.263056°W
- Completed: 1990

Height
- Roof: 157.58 m (517.0 ft)

Technical details
- Floor count: 37
- Floor area: 63,754 m^{2} (686,240 sq ft)

Design and construction
- Architect: Albert C. Martin & Associates
- Structural engineer: Nabih Youssef Associates

The TCW Tower is a 37-story, 157.58 m (517.0 ft) skyscraper in Los Angeles, California. It is the 34th tallest building in the city. The building was completed in 1990 when it and its designer, Albert C. Martin & Associates, were awarded the Outstanding Structural Design Award by the Los Angeles Tall Building Structural Design Council.

The building is adjacent to the Original Pantry Cafe, a city landmark from which developers Manufacturers Life Insurance acquired air rights from in 1985. It is named after the TCW Group, which had its headquarters in the tower until its move to City National Plaza in 2024. Banc of California leased 40,000 square feet (3,700 m^{2}) in 2025 with the right to put its name on the building.

== Tenants ==
- Law Offices of Harris & Associates
- Quinn Emanuel Urquhart & Sullivan
- Los Angeles Department of Water and Power

== Gallery ==
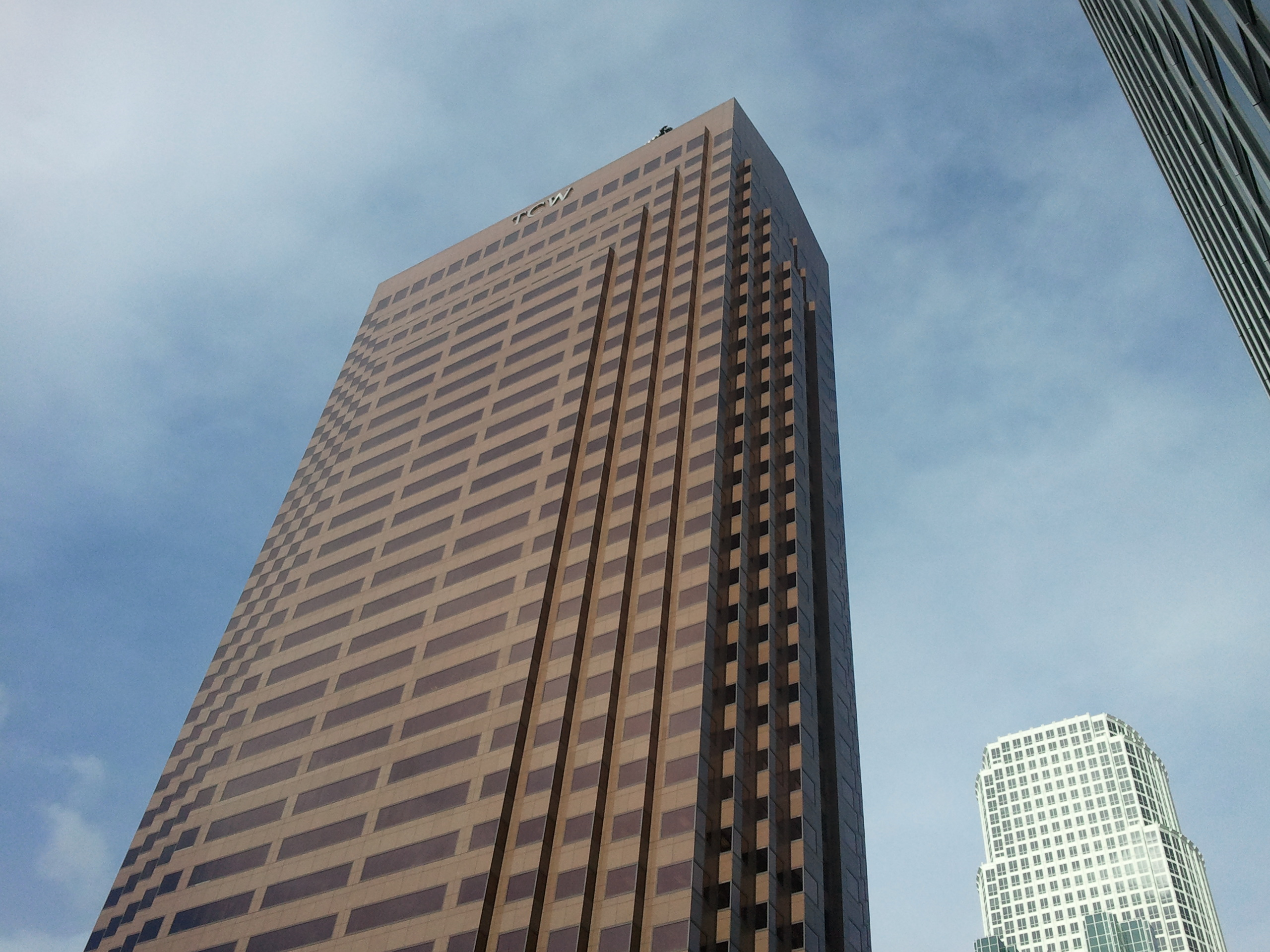
The Tower with the 777 Tower in the background

== See also ==
- List of tallest buildings in Los Angeles
