= Century City Center =

Coordinates: 34.0594°N 118.4164°W

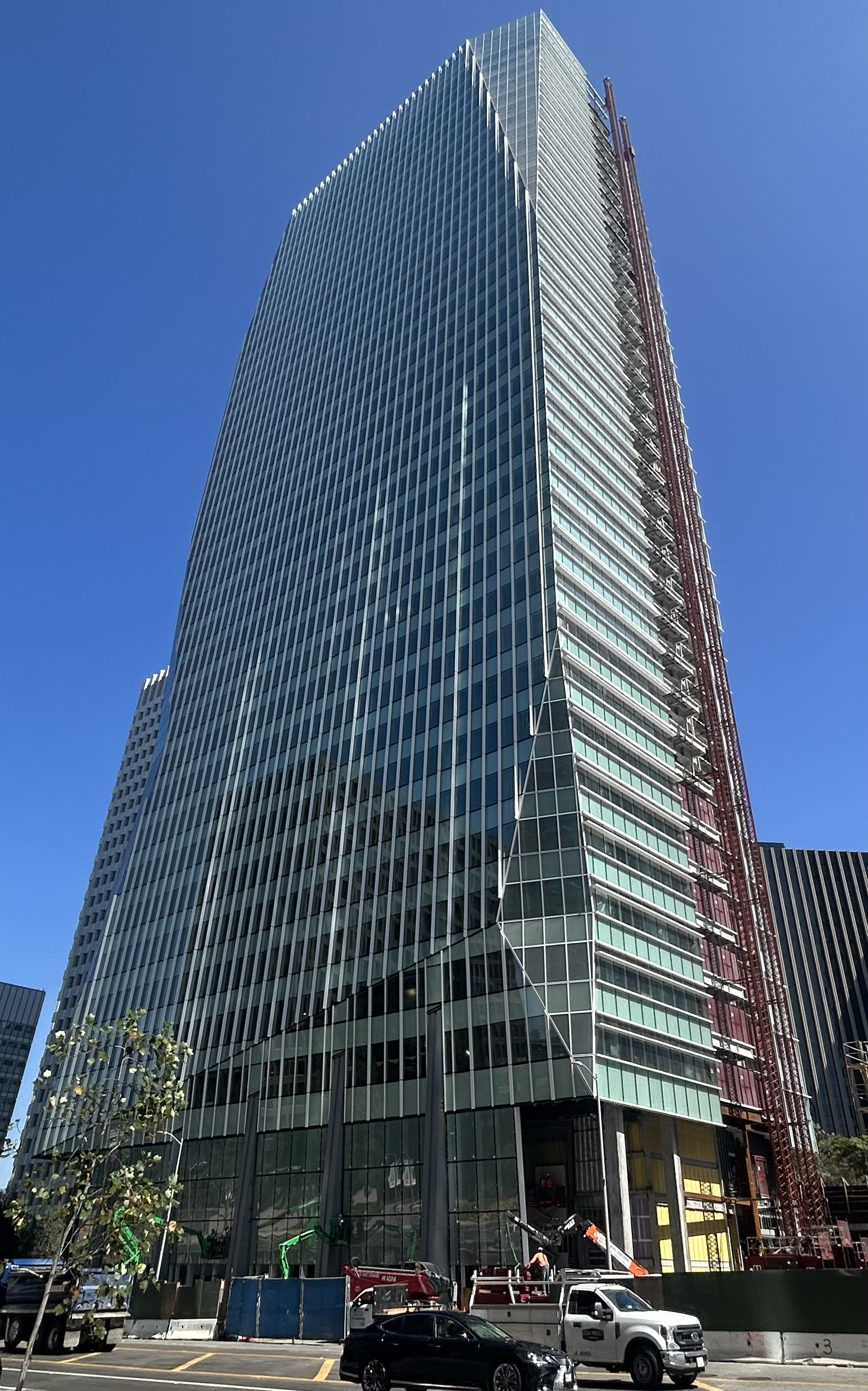
- Construction progress in September 2025
- Interactive map of the Century City Center area

General information
- Architectural style: Modern
- Location: Avenue of the Stars, Century City
- Completed: 2026

Design and construction
- Architect: Johnson Fain

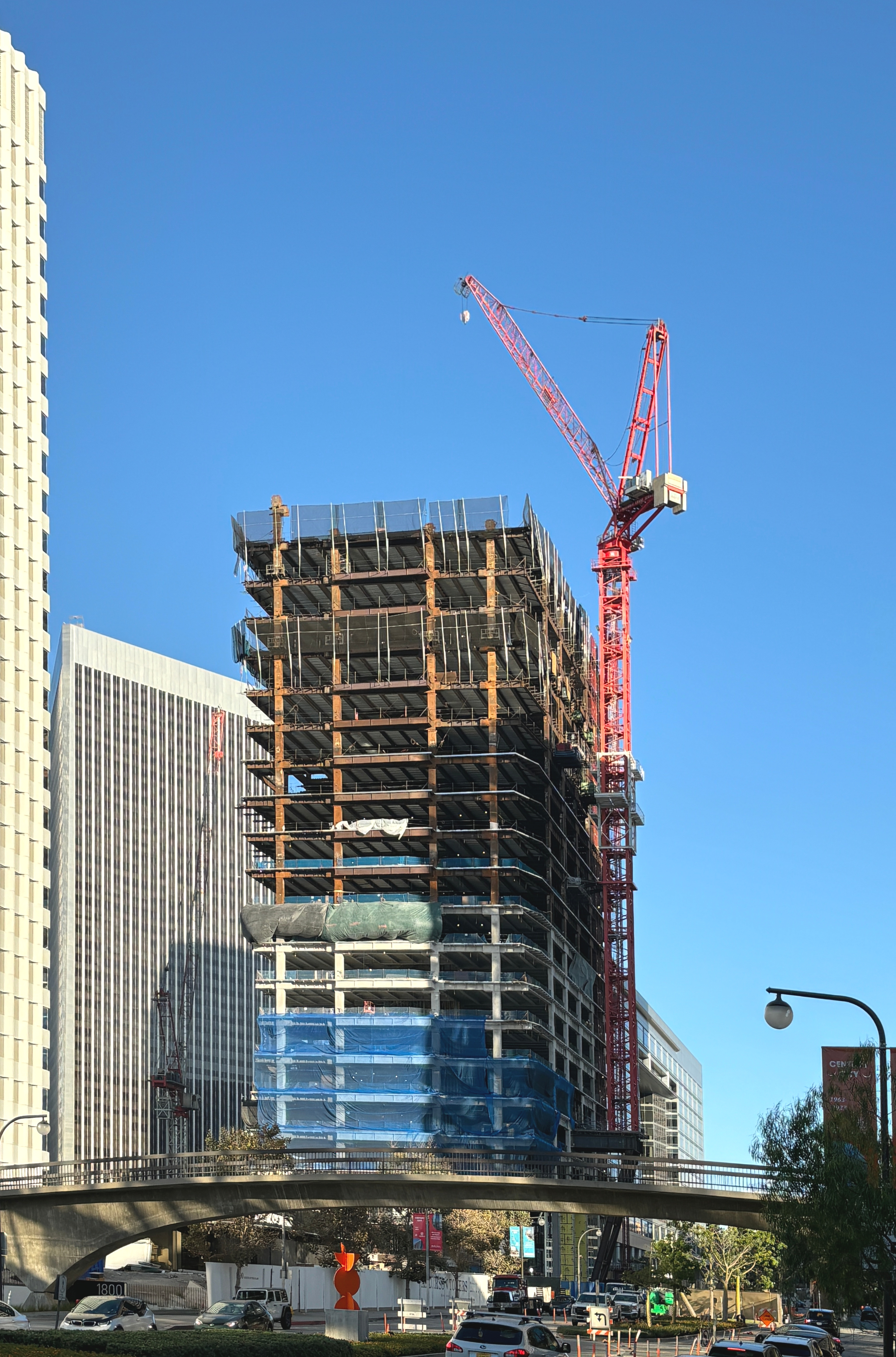
Century City Center during construction in August 2024

Century City Center is a tower under construction in Century City, Los Angeles, California. Its architect is Johnson Fain. When completed, it will be 37 stories tall and have 730,000 square feet of office space. Creative Artists Agency will relocate their headquarters to Century City Center when the building is completed.

== See also ==
- List of tallest buildings in Los Angeles
- List of tallest buildings in California
