= Ten Thousand (Los Angeles) =

40-story residential skyscraper located at 10000 Santa Monica Boulevard, Los Angeles

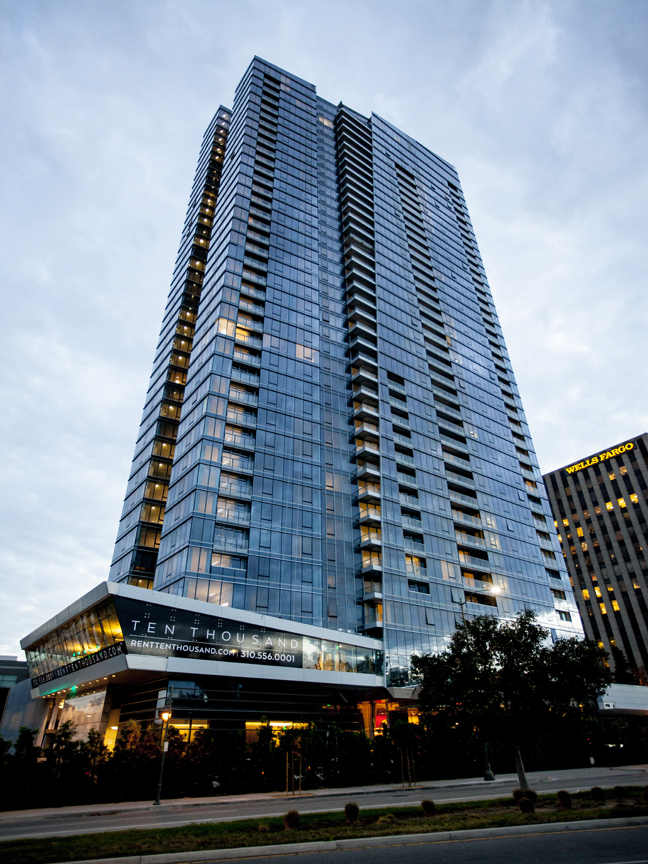

- Location within Western Los Angeles

General information
- Status: Completed
- Type: Residential apartments
- Location: 10000 Santa Monica Boulevard; Los Angeles, California
- Coordinates: 34.06358°N 118.41427°W
- Construction started: 2014
- Completed: 2017
- Cost: $390 million

Height
- Roof: 483 ft (147 m)

Technical details
- Floor count: 40

Design and construction
- Architect: Handel Architects
- Developer: Crescent Heights

Other information
- Number of units: 283
- Parking: 510 parking spaces

Ten Thousand is a 40-story residential skyscraper located at 10000 Santa Monica Boulevard in Los Angeles. The high-rise tower, built by developer Crescent Heights and was designed by Handel Architects, opened in 2017 with 283 luxury apartments and a maximum height of 483 feet. As of February 2025, it is the 40th-tallest building in Los Angeles.

== Overview ==
The 2.4-acre lot was occupied by an office building built in 1970, and the site was once home to Jimmy's Restaurant, a popular hangout for celebrities and local politicians. After its demolition in the early 2000s, the site was considered highly valuable and was contested by many developers including Donald Trump. The auction was won by SunCal Cos of Irvine, but the company filed for bankruptcy in 2008. The site was bought for $59 million by Crescent Heights in late 2010. The project was financed by the Bank of China, which lent $390 million in mortgage financing to Crescent Heights. Construction started in 2014 and finished in July 2017, with Ten Thousand opening for lease soon after. In March 2018, Ten Thousand's eco-friendly status was recognized with a LEED Gold rating by the U.S. Green Building Council.

The building's exterior is made from metal panel, stone, and glass. The structural engineer was Magnusson Klemencic Associates. The building envelope consultant was Arup. The interiors and landscape were designed by Shamir Shah Design and RELM Studio. The building is located between Century City and Beverly Hills, and is walking distance from Rodeo Drive and Westfield Century City. Amenities include a one-acre park, two swimming pools, a tennis court, a basketball court, a gym, a resident lounge, a private cinema, butler services, and elements of Smart Home technology.

== Accidents and incidents ==
On June 22, 2020, American businessman Steve Bing jumped to his death from his apartment on the 27th floor. Once the heir to a $600 million fortune, drug addiction and various bad business decisions had resulted in his fortune being reduced to $300,000. He had also reportedly been suffering from depression caused by a lack of human contact during COVID-19 lockdowns.

== See also ==
- List of tallest buildings in Los Angeles
