= List of tallest buildings in Los Angeles =

Skyline of Los Angeles
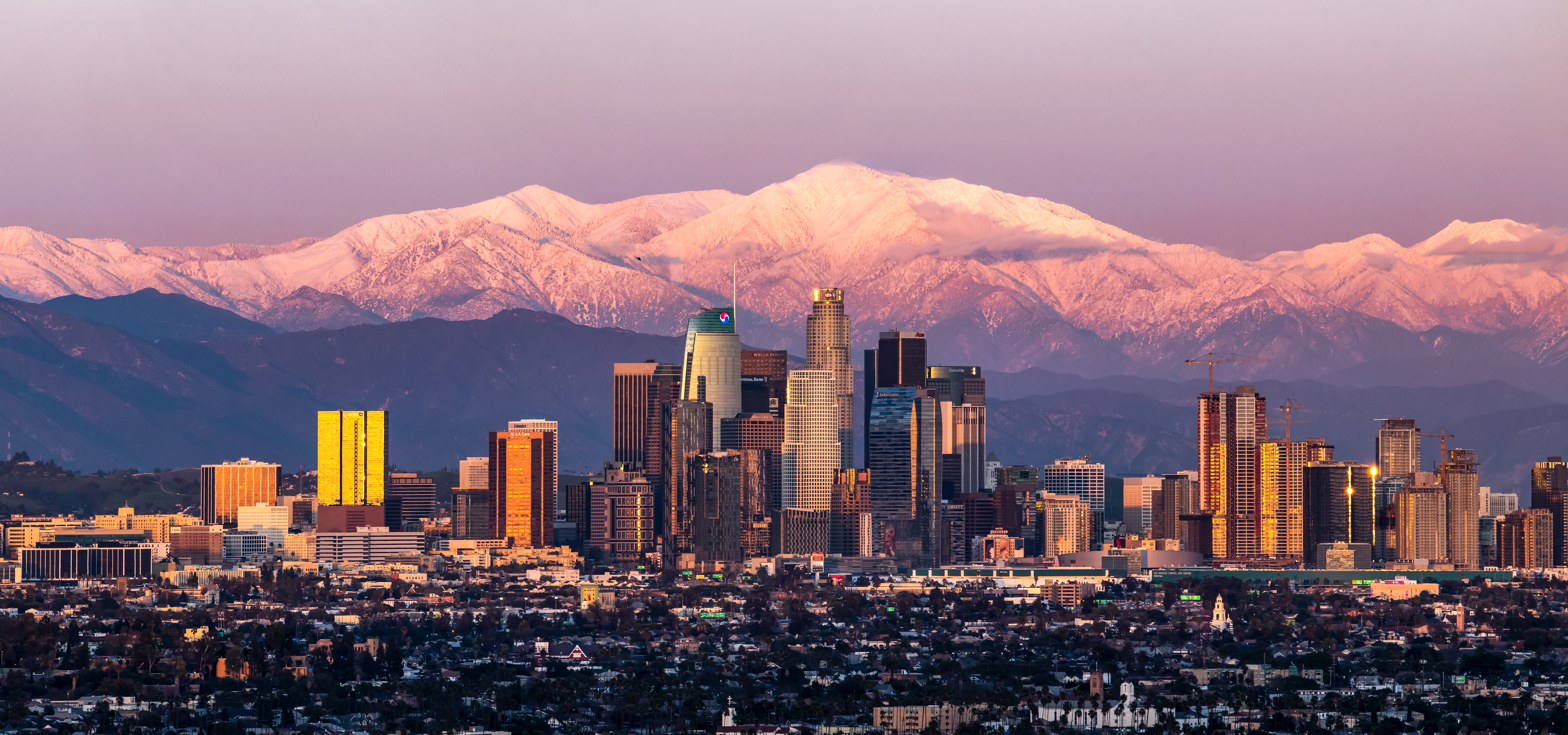
- Downtown Los Angeles in 2019
- Tallest building: Wilshire Grand Center (2017)
- Tallest building height: 1,100 ft (335 m)
- Major clusters: Downtown Los Angeles; Century City
- First 150 m+ building: Union Bank Plaza (1967)

Number of tall buildings (2026)
- Taller than 100 m (328 ft): 88 + 1 T/O (Note: Topped-out)
- Taller than 150 m (492 ft): 32 + 1 T/O
- Taller than 200 m (656 ft): 13
- Taller than 300 m (984 ft): 2

Number of tall buildings — feet
- Taller than 300 ft (91.4 m): 107 + 1 T/O

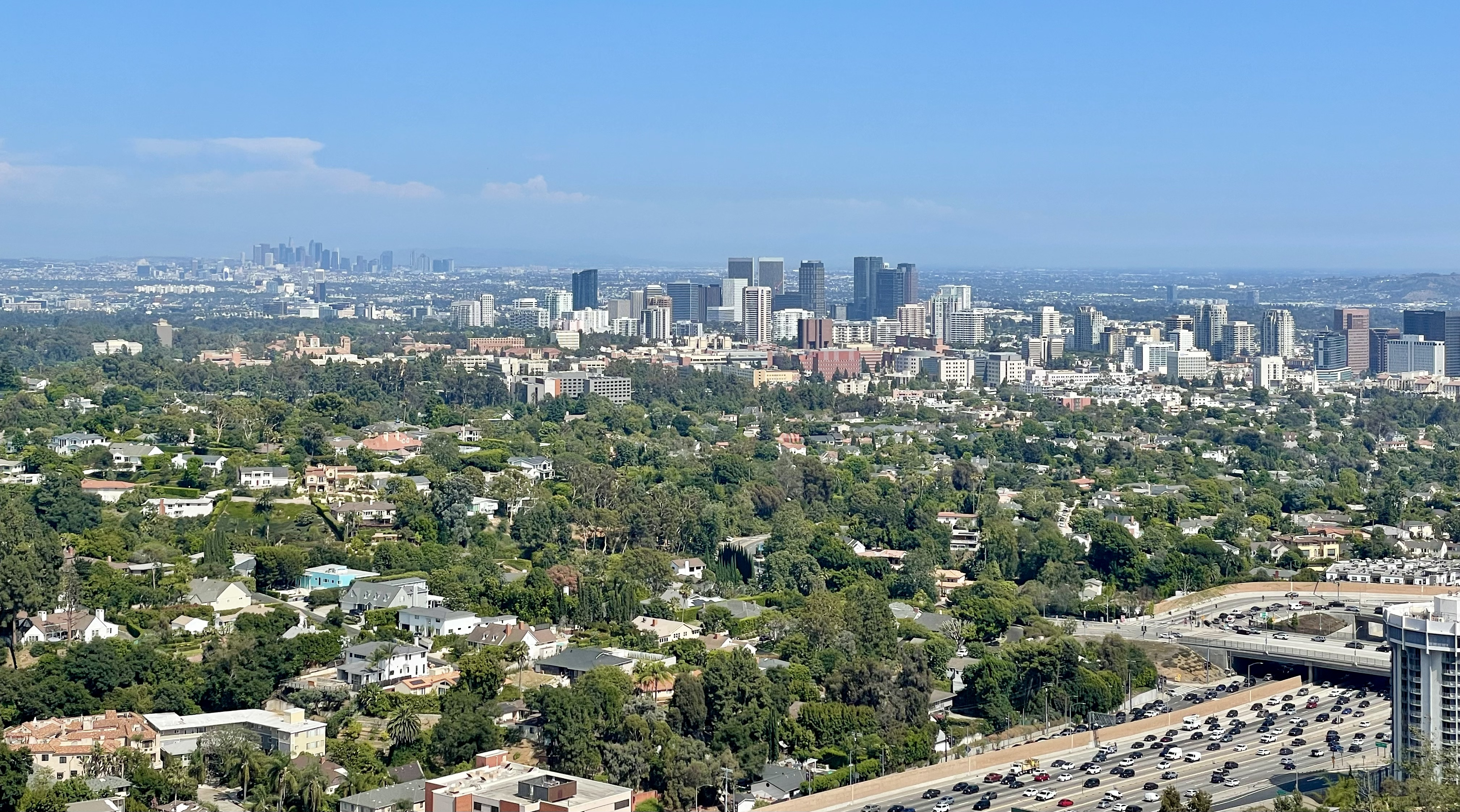
The skyline of Westwood and Century City in 2024, with downtown in the background (left)

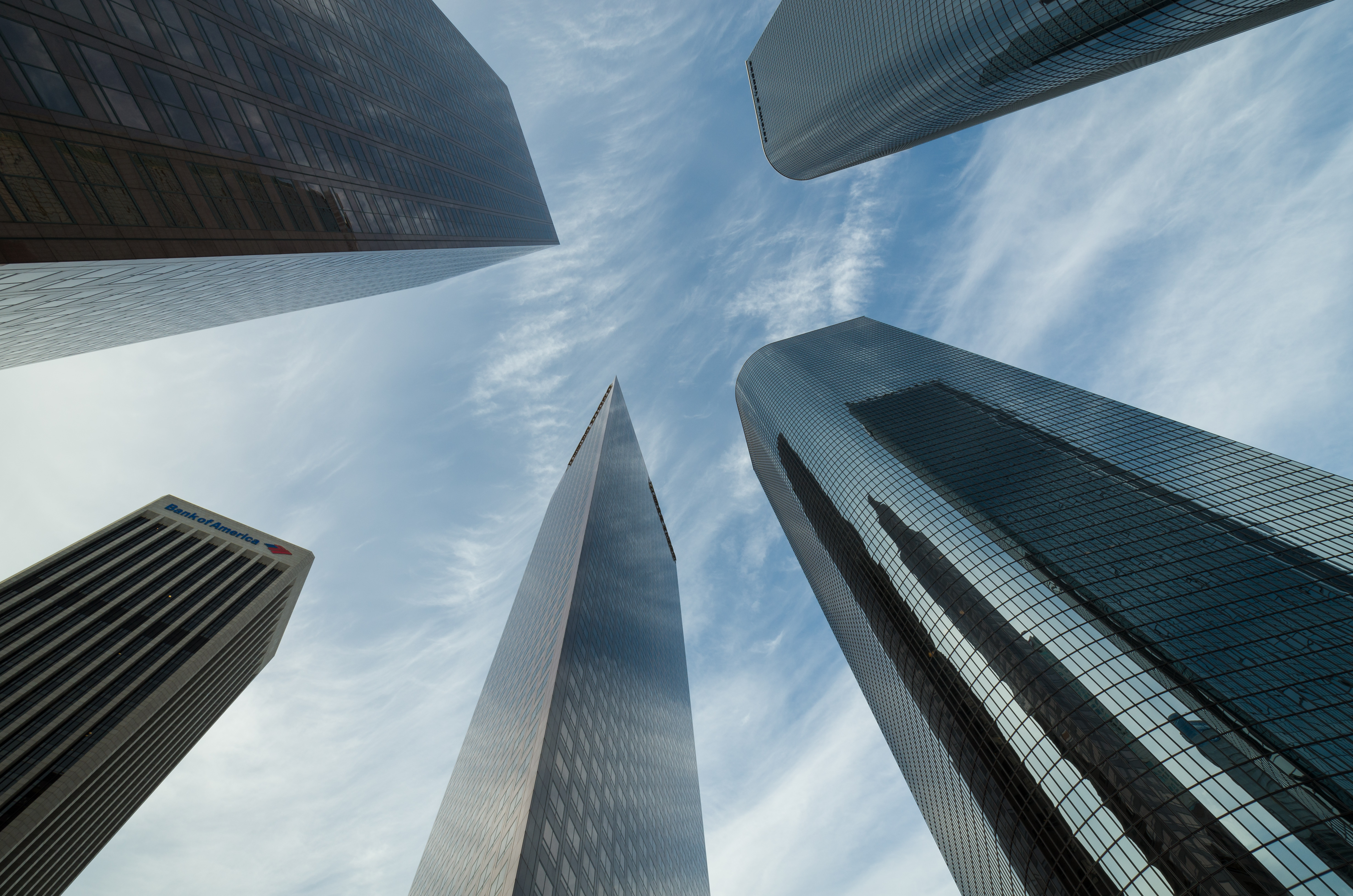
Looking up at skyscrapers in Bunker Hill

Los Angeles is the second largest city in the United States, and the largest in California, with a metropolitan area population of over 12 million. Los Angeles has the largest skyline in California and the West Coast; it has more than 800 high-rise buildings and can be seen from many locations around the Greater Los Angeles Area, including from San Gorgonio Mountain, 82 miles away. However, despite being the country's second largest city, Los Angeles ranks fifth in the United States in number of skyscrapers taller than 492 feet (150 m), with 31 as of 2026, after New York City, Chicago, Miami, and Houston. Los Angeles has two supertall skyscrapers: Wilshire Grand Center and the U.S. Bank Tower. Upon its completion in 1989, the US Bank Tower, at 1,018 feet (310 m), remained the tallest building in the city until Wilshire Grand Center was built in 2017 to a height of 1,100 feet (335.3 m).

The history of skyscrapers in Los Angeles began with the 1903 completion of the 13-story Braly Building, which is often regarded as the first high-rise in the city. The Braly building has since been converted from a commercial structure to a residential tower and is now known as the Continental Building. The growth of Los Angeles' skyline during the early 20th century was hampered by a height restriction imposed in 1904, prohibiting the construction of buildings taller than 150 feet (46 m), effectively limiting the height of buildings to 13 stories. An exception was made for Los Angeles City Hall, built in 1928, which dominated the skyline for over three decades.

In 1957, the city government removed the 150-foot height limit. Los Angeles then went through a large building boom that lasted from the early 1960s to the early 1990s, during which most of the city's tallest buildings were completed, including the U.S. Bank Tower, Aon Center, and Two California Plaza. Skyscrapers built during this period tended to have flat roofs, a result of a 1958 ordinance meant to accommodate fire-fighting equipment. This ordinance was rescinded in 2014. From the 1990s to 2000s, skyscraper development in the city largely stalled, then a second construction boom took place from the mid-2010s to the early 2020s. The latter boom had an increasing share of residential development and saw the downtown skyline expand southwards.

The majority of skyscrapers taller than 500 ft (152 m) in Los Angeles are located in northwest downtown, bounded to the west by Route 110. The rest are mostly in Century City. Between these clusters is a linear skyline that runs east-west along Wilshire Boulevard through Koreatown and Miracle Mile. Wilshire Boulevard continues west of Century City to Westwood, where the skyline shifts to residential high-rises. Other high-rise clusters in the city include: Century Boulevard by Los Angeles International Airport, the Hollywood district in central Los Angeles, as well as Warner Center, Encino and Universal City in the San Fernando Valley. More high-rise clusters are found throughout Greater Los Angeles, including in Glendale, Irvine, and Long Beach.

== History ==
Number of buildings by height in Los Angeles by the end of each year. Click on the legend to toggle a specific height on or off. View chart definition.

In 2015, construction began on Oceanwide Plaza, a three-tower development on a parking lot next to the Staples Center, located on the southwest of Downtown Los Angeles. The tallest of the buildings was to be 677 feet (209 m) tall. Developed by Chinese developer Oceanwide Holdings, construction stopped in 2019 as Oceanwide ran out of funds. The towers, which are near their intended height, has sat unfinished since. Development has been beset by financing problems related to ongoing geopolitical tensions between the United States and China. In early 2024, at least 27 floors of multiple towers at the complex were tagged with graffiti, becoming known as the Graffiti Towers.

== Cityscape ==
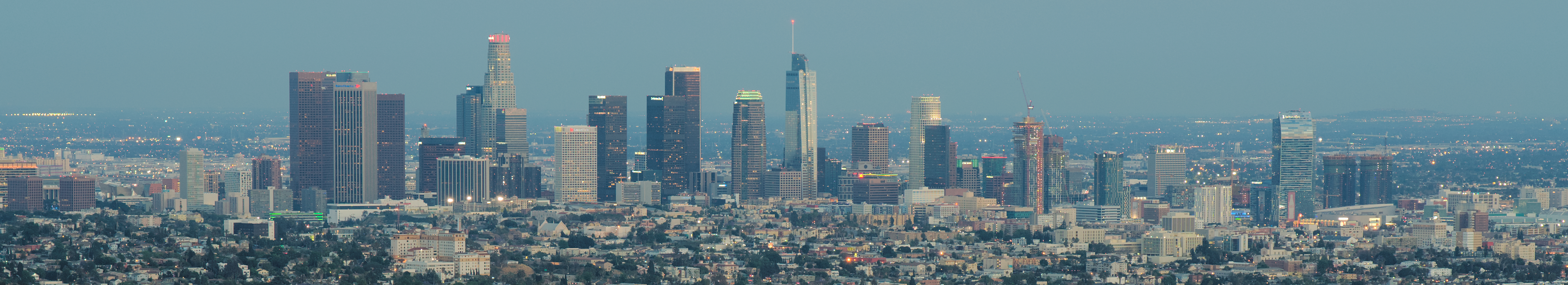
Downtown Los Angeles from the Griffith Observatory in 2017 (Click or hover over image to identify buildings)

== Map of tallest buildings ==
The maps below show the location of buildings taller than 300 feet (91.4 m) in Los Angeles in its primary high-rise neighborhoods. Each marker is numbered by height and colored by the decade of the building's completion.

=== Downtown Los Angeles ===
Downtown Los Angeles contains the majority of high-rises in the city. This map covers a smaller area than the two maps shown further below.

Buildings taller than 300 ft (91 m) in Downtown Los Angeles.
- 1950s and before
- 1960s
- 1970s
- 1980s
- 1990s
- 2000s
- 2010s
- 2020s
1 Wilshire Grand Center
2 U.S. Bank Tower
3 Aon Center
4 Two California Plaza
5 Gas Company Tower
6 Wells Fargo Tower
7 Bank of America Plaza
8 777 Tower
9 Figueroa at Wilshire
10 City National Tower
11 Paul Hastings Tower
12 The Beaudry
13 The Ritz-Carlton Los Angeles
14 Thea at Metropolis Tower 3
15 FourFortyFour South Flower
16 611 Place
17 Wells Fargo South Tower
18 Olympic and Hill
19 One California Plaza
23 820 Olive
26 Ernst & Young Plaza
28 TCW Tower
29 Union Bank Plaza
30 The Grand by Gehry
32 1100 Wilshire
37 Figueroa Eight
38 Moxy + AC Hotel Los Angeles Downtown
39 ARCO Tower
40 Metropolis Tower 2
41 Los Angeles City Hall
43 South Park Center
44 AT&T Switching Center
45 Metropolis Tower 1
47 Aven
48 Hope+Flower Tower 2
49 One Wilshire
50 MCI Center
51 Circa Tower I
52 Circa Tower II
53 Metro Headquarters Building
55 WaterMarke Tower
57 Westin Bonaventure Hotel
58 Alloy
59 Perla
60 801 Tower
61 Hope+Flower Tower 1
62 Mellon Bank Center
63 Roybal Federal Building
64 Level
67 Beaudry Center
71 Figueroa Tower
72 255 Grand
74 Atelier
75 KPMG Center
76 Bunker Hill Tower
78 City National Bank Building
82 Biltmore Tower
84 1000 Wilshire
85 Alina I
86 888 Grand Hope Lofts
87 1133 South Hope Street
91 Conrad Los Angeles
99 Sheraton Los Angeles
100 Alina II
104 International Tower

=== Koreatown and Mid-Wilshire ===
In the central region of Los Angeles, high-rises are mostly clustered around Wilshire Boulevard, which mainly runs east-west in this area.

Buildings taller than 300 ft (91 m) along Wilshire Boulevard in central Los Angeles
- 1960s
- 1970s
- 1980s
- 1990s
- 2000s
- 2010s
- 2020s
42 Equitable Life Building
46 5900 Wilshire
56 Hallasan Tower
65 5670 Wilshire Boulevard
94 The Vermont West Tower
97 Mercury
98 6500 Wilshire Boulevard
101 One Park Plaza
102 6300 Wilshire Boulevard

=== Westside ===
In the map below, Century City is shown on the right.

Buildings taller than 300 ft (91 m) in Westside Los Angeles
- 1960s
- 1970s
- 1980s
- 1990s
- 2000s
- 2010s
- 2020s
20 Century Plaza Tower I
21 Century Plaza Tower II
22 Century City Center
24 Park Elm at Century Plaza I
25 Park Elm at Century Plaza II
27 SunAmerica Center
33 2121 Avenue of the Stars
34 Constellation Place
35 Ten Thousand
36 The Century
54 1900 Avenue of the Stars
66 10100 Santa Monica Blvd
68 Blair House
69 Wilshire at Westwood
70 Center West
77 The Landmark Los Angeles
79 10960 Wilshire Boulevard
80 Century Park Plaza
81 The Wilshire
83 Wilshire Landmark I
88 Eighteen Eighty Eight Building
89 World Savings Center
90 The Tower
92 Westwood Gateway I
95 2220 Avenue of the Stars
96 2222 Avenue of the Stars
103 Northrop Grumman Plaza II
106 12100 Wilshire Boulevard
107 The Carlyle on Wilshire
108 Barrington Plaza Building A

== Tallest buildings ==
This list ranks Los Angeles skyscrapers that stand at least 300 feet (91 m) tall, based on standard height measurement. This includes spires and architectural details but does not include antenna masts. The "Year" column indicates the year a building was completed. Buildings tied in height are sorted by year of completion, and then alphabetically.

Was the tallest building in Los Angeles upon completion
Architecturally topped out but not yet completed

Rank	Name	Image	Location	Height ft (m)	Floors	Year	Purpose	Notes
1	Wilshire Grand Center		Downtown 34°03′00″N 118°15′36″W	1,100 (335.3)	73	2017	Mixed-use	16th-tallest building in the United States, tallest building on the West Coast of the United States, tallest building in California; tallest building completed in Los Angeles in the 2010s. Mixed-use office and hotel building. When measured by roof height, the tower is 934 feet (285 m) tall, which is 84 feet (26 m) shorter than the roof of the U.S. Bank Tower roof.
2	U.S. Bank Tower		Downtown 34°03′04″N 118°15′16″W	1,018 (310.3)	73	1990	Office	25th-tallest building in the United States, third-tallest building on the West Coast of the United States, third tallest building in California; tallest building in the world with a helipad on its roof; tallest building completed in Los Angeles in the 1980s. Tallest building in Los Angeles from 1990 to 2017. Formerly known as Library Tower. At the time of its completion, the building was the tallest structure in a major active seismic region (Taipei 101 now holds this title).
3	Aon Center		Downtown 34°02′57″N 118°15′25″W	858 (261.5)	62	1974	Office	Tallest building in Los Angeles from 1974 to 1990. Tallest building completed in Los Angeles in the 1970s. Also known by its street address, 707 Wilshire Tower.
4	Two California Plaza		Downtown 34°03′05″N 118°15′06″W	750 (228.6)	52	1992	Office	Tallest building completed in Los Angeles in the 1990s.
5	Gas Company Tower		Downtown 34°03′00″N 118°15′12″W	749 (228.3)	52	1991	Office	
6	Wells Fargo Tower		Downtown 34°03′10″N 118°15′07″W	740 (225.6)	54	1983	Office	
7	Bank of America Plaza		Downtown 34°03′13″N 118°15′12″W	735 (224)	55	1975	Office	Formerly known as Security Pacific Bank Plaza, ARCO Plaza, and BP Plaza.
8	777 Tower		Downtown 34°02′54″N 118°15′41″W	725 (221)	53	1991	Office	
9	Figueroa at Wilshire		Downtown 34°03′03″N 118°15′33″W	717 (218.5)	52	1989	Office	Formerly known as the Sanwa Bank Building.
10	City National Tower		Downtown 34°03′05″N 118°15′25″W	699 (213.1)	52	1971	Office	Joint-tallest buildings in Los Angeles from 1971 to 1974. Formerly known as Bank of America and ARCO Towers; these buildings are the tallest twin towers in Los Angeles.
10	Paul Hastings Tower		Downtown 34°03′03″N 118°15′28″W	699 (213.1)	52	1971	Office	Joint-tallest buildings in Los Angeles from 1971 to 1974. Formerly known as Bank of America and ARCO Towers; these buildings are the tallest twin towers in Los Angeles.
12	The Beaudry		Downtown 34°02′58″N 118°15′43″W	695 (211.7)	64	2023	Residential	Tallest residential building in Los Angeles.
13	The Ritz-Carlton Los Angeles		Downtown 34°02′43″N 118°16′01″W	667 (203.3)	54	2010	Mixed-use	Mixed-use residential and hotel building. Tallest building completed in Los Angeles in the 2010s until the Wilshire Grand Center.
14	Thea at Metropolis Tower 3	–	Downtown 34°02′56″N 118°15′49″W	627 (191.1)	56	2019	Residential	
15	FourFortyFour South Flower		Downtown 34°03′06″N 118°15′18″W	625 (190.5)	48	1982	Office	Formerly known as Citigroup Center and the 444 Flower Building.
16	611 Place		Downtown 34°02′57″N 118°15′19″W	620 (189)	42	1969	Office	Tallest building in Los Angeles from 1969 to 1971. Tallest building completed in Los Angeles in the 1960s. Also known as 611 West 6th Street.
17	Wells Fargo South Tower		Downtown 34°03′08″N 118°15′10″W	606 (184.8)	45	1984	Office	Also known as KPMG Tower.
18	Olympic and Hill		Downtown 34°02′28″N 118°15′30″W	594 (181)	53	2025	Residential	Topped off in late 2024.
19	One California Plaza		Downtown 34°03′08″N 118°15′05″W	578 (176.2)	42	1985	Office	
20	Century Plaza Tower I		Century City 34°03′34″N 118°24′50″W	571 (174)	44	1975	Office	Tallest buildings in Century City, and in Los Angeles outside of downtown. Similar design elements as the World Trade Center, designed by same architect Minoru Yamasaki. Twin buildings. Part of the Century Plaza complex.
21	Century Plaza Tower II		Century City 34°03′31″N 118°24′47″W	571 (174)	44	1975	Office	Tallest buildings in Century City, and in Los Angeles outside of downtown. Designed by Minoru Yamasaki. Twin buildings. Part of the Century Plaza complex.
22	Century City Center		Century City 34°03′35″N 118°24′58″W	564 (171.9)	37	2026	Office	Topped off in December 2024.
23	820 Olive		Downtown 34°02′39″N 118°15′24″W	563 (172)	53	2019	Residential	Also known as 825 South Hill. Tallest residential building in California until the completion of Thea at Metropolita Tower 3.
24	Park Elm at Century Plaza I		Century City 34°03′27″N 118°24′59″W	559 (170.3)	45	2022	Residential	Condo addition to the renovated Century Plaza Hotel. Also known as Century Plaza North Tower.
25	Park Elm at Century Plaza II		Century City 34°03′25″N 118°24′57″W	559 (170.3)	45	2022	Residential	Also known as Century Plaza South Tower.
26	Ernst & Young Plaza		Downtown 34°02′57″N 118°15′39″W	534 (162.8)	41	1985	Office	
27	SunAmerica Center		Century City 34°03′31″N 118°25′00″W	533 (162.5)	39	1989	Office	Also known by its street address, 1999 Avenue of the Stars
28	TCW Tower		Downtown 34°02′48″N 118°15′47″W	517 (157.6)	37	1990	Office	
29	Union Bank Plaza		Downtown 34°03′11″N 118°15′26″W	516 (157.3)	40	1967	Office	Tallest building in Los Angeles from 1967 to 1969. First skyscraper built in the central business district of Los Angeles following the repeal of the 150-foot height limit in 1957.
30	The Grand by Gehry		Downtown 34°03′15″N 118°14′56″W	511 (155.7)	43	2022	Residential	
31	10 Universal City Plaza		Universal City 34°08′18″N 118°21′43″W	506 (154.2)	36	1984	Office	Tallest building in the San Fernando Valley. Although near the unincorporated area of Universal City, this building is located within Los Angeles city limits.
32	1100 Wilshire		Downtown 34°03′08″N 118°15′49″W	496 (151.2)	36	1987	Residential	
33	2121 Avenue of the Stars		Century City 34°03′19″N 118°24′48″W	492 (150)	34	1987	Office	Formerly known as Fox Plaza. The building has been featured in at least four major motion pictures released by Fox, most notably as the fictional Nakatomi Plaza in the 1988 action film Die Hard.
34	Constellation Place		Century City 34°03′25″N 118°25′03″W	490 (149.5)	35	2003	Office	First high rise to be completed in the 21st century in Los Angeles. Formerly known as MGM Tower.
35	Ten Thousand		Century City 34°03′48″N 118°24′52″W	483 (147.2)	40	2016	Residential	Tallest building completed in Century City in the 2010s.
36	The Century		Century City 34°03′22″N 118°24′52″W	478 (145.7)	42	2009	Residential	
37	Figueroa Eight		Downtown 34°02′54″N 118°15′37″W	478 (145.7)	42	2024	Residential	Also known as 8th and Figueroa.
38	Moxy + AC Hotel Los Angeles Downtown	–	Downtown 34°02′27″N 118°16′03″W	465 (141.8)	38	2023	Hotel	A Moxy Hotel and AC Branded Hotel. Also known as Fig+Pico Tower A.
39	ARCO Tower		Downtown 34°03′03″N 118°15′47″W	461 (140.5)	33	1989	Office	Also known as 1055 West Seventh.
40	Metropolis Tower 2		Downtown 34°02′53″N 118°15′49″W	461 (140.5)	40	2018	Residential	
41	Los Angeles City Hall		Downtown 34°03′13″N 118°14′34″W	454 (138.4)	27	1928	Office	Tallest building in Los Angeles from 1928 to 1967. Tallest building completed in Los Angeles in the 1920s; tallest base-isolated structure in the world.
42	Equitable Life Building		Koreatown 34°03′44″N 118°17′55″W	454 (138.4)	34	1969	Office	Tallest building in Koreatown.
43	South Park Center		Downtown 34°02′22″N 118°15′42″W	452 (137.8)	32	1965	Office	Formerly known as the AT&T Center, SBC Tower, Transamerica Building, and Occidental Life Building.
44	AT&T Switching Center		Downtown 34°03′03″N 118°15′10″W	448 (136.6)	17	1961	Office	
45	Metropolis Tower 1		Downtown 34°02′53″N 118°15′53″W	442 (134.7)	39	2017	Residential	
46	5900 Wilshire		Mid-Wilshire 34°03′44″N 118°21′31″W	435 (132.6)	31	1970	Office	
47	Aven		Downtown 34°02′27″N 118°15′44″W	428 (130.5)	37	2019	Residential	Also known as 120 South Grand Avenue.
48	Hope+Flower Tower 2	–	Downtown 34°02′27″N 118°15′56″W	421 (128)	31	2019	Residential	
49	One Wilshire		Downtown 34°02′52″N 118°15′20″W	418 (127.4)	28	1967	Office	
50	MCI Center		Downtown 34°02′53″N 118°15′32″W	414 (126.3)	33	1973	Office	Also known by its street address, 700 South Flower Street.
51	Circa Tower I	–	Downtown 34°02′29″N 118°16′00″W	406 (123.8)	35	2018	Residential	Twin buildings.
52	Circa Tower II	–	Downtown 34°02′29″N 118°15′58″W	406 (123.8)	35	2018	Residential	Twin buildings.
53	Metro Headquarters Building		Downtown 34°03′23″N 118°13′58″W	398 (121.3)	26	1995	Office	Also known as the MTA Building.
54	1900 Avenue of the Stars		Century City 34°03′37″N 118°24′59″W	397 (121)	27	1969	Office	
55	WaterMarke Tower	–	Downtown 34°02′46″N 118°15′42″W	395 (120.4)	35	2009	Residential	Also known as Meruelo Tower, or Ninth & Flower Condominiums.
56	Hallasan Tower	–	Koreatown 34°03′36″N 118°17′34″W	395 (120.4)	38	2023	Residential	Tallest residential building in Koreatown.
57	Westin Bonaventure Hotel		Downtown 34°03′10″N 118°15′21″W	388 (118.3)	35	1976	Hotel	
58	Alloy	–	Arts District 34°02′28″N 118°13′55″W	390 (118.9)	35	2024	Residential	Also known by its street address, 520 Mateo Street.
59	Perla	–	Downtown 34°02′56″N 118°14′58″W	388 (118.3)	35	2020	Residential	
60	801 Tower		Downtown 34°02′52″N 118°15′43″W	381 (116)	24	1992	Office	
61	Hope+Flower Tower 1	–	Downtown 34°02′27″N 118°15′54″W	377 (114.8)	41	2020	Residential	
62	Mellon Bank Center	–	Downtown 34°03′05″N 118°15′13″W	375 (114.3)	26	1982	Office	
63	Roybal Federal Building		Downtown 34°03′10″N 118°14′21″W	367 (112)	22	1991	Office	
64	Level		Downtown 34°02′38″N 118°15′28″W	365 (111.3)	32	2015	Residential	
65	5670 Wilshire Boulevard		Mid-Wilshire 34°03′43″N 118°21′08″W	364 (111)	28	1967	Office	
66	10100 Santa Monica Boulevard	–	Century City 34°03′42″N 118°25′00″W	364 (111)	26	1971	Office	
67	Beaudry Center	–	Downtown 34°03′23″N 118°15′27″W	364 (111)	29	1986	Office	
68	Blair House	–	Westwood 34°03′52″N 118°25′53″W	364 (111)	29	1989	Residential	Tallest building in Westwood. Also known as The Evian.
69	Wilshire at Westwood		Westwood 34°03′31″N 118°26′34″W	363 (110.6)	24	1971	Office	Also known as Oppenheimer Tower.
70	Center West	–	Westwood 34°03′34″N 118°26′33″W	361 (110)	23	1990	Office	
71	Figueroa Tower	–	Downtown 34°02′58″N 118°15′34″W	358 (109)	28	1989	Office	
72	255 Grand		Downtown 34°03′13″N 118°15′05″W	354 (108)	27	1988	Residential	
73	Warner Center Plaza III		Warner Center 34°10′44″N 118°36′04″W	352 (107.3)	25	1991	Office	Tallest building in the Warner Center business district.
74	Atelier		Downtown 34°02′42″N 118°15′26″W	352 (107.3)	33	2017	Residential	Also known by its street address, 801 Olive Street.
75	KPMG Center	–	Downtown 34°02′59″N 118°15′20″W	351 (107)	28	1991	Office	
76	Bunker Hill Tower	–	Downtown 34°03′22″N 118°15′07″W	349 (106.4)	32	1968	Office	
77	The Landmark Los Angeles	–	Sawtelle 34°02′51″N 118°27′41″W	349 (106.4)	34	2021	Residential	Also known as Landmark Two.
78	City National Bank Building		Downtown 34°02′51″N 118°15′15″W	348 (106.1)	24	1968	Office	
79	10960 Wilshire Boulevard	–	Westwood 34°03′28″N 118°26′45″W	347 (105.8)	24	1971	Office	Also known as Saban Plaza, Wilshire Midvale, and International Industries Plaza.
80	Century Park Plaza	–	Century City 34°03′44″N 118°24′57″W	347 (105.8)	24	1973	Office	
81	The Wilshire	–	Westwood 34°03′41″N 118°25′58″W	344 (104.9)	27	1990	Residential	
82	Biltmore Tower		Downtown 34°02′59″N 118°15′14″W	340 (103.6)	25	1987	Office	
83	Wilshire Landmark I	–	Sawtelle 34°02′56″N 118°27′45″W	335 (102)	24	1986	Office	
84	1000 Wilshire		Downtown 34°03′02″N 118°15′41″W	335 (102)	21	1987	Office	Also known as the Wedrush Center.
85	Alina I	–	Downtown 34°02′45″N 118°15′46″W	334 (101.8)	28	2011	Residential	Also known as Concerto Tower 1.
86	888 Grand Hope Lofts	–	Downtown 34°02′43″N 118°15′35″W	330 (100.6)	34	2018	Residential	
87	1133 South Hope Street	–	Downtown 34°02′30″N 118°15′51″W	330 (100.6)	28	2020	Residential	
88	Eighteen Eighty Eight Building	–	Century City 34°03′40″N 118°24′50″W	328 (100)	21	1971	Office	
89	World Savings Center	–	Sawtelle 34°03′03″N 118°27′35″W	328 (100)	25	1983	Office	
90	The Tower	–	Westwood 34°03′29″N 118°26′42″W	327 (99.7)	23	1988	Office	Also known as Wilshire Midvale Tower
91	Conrad Los Angeles		Downtown 34°03′19″N 118°14′55″W	326 (99.5)	27	2022	Hotel	
92	Westwood Gateway I	–	Westwood 34°02′53″N 118°26′42″W	326 (99.3)	22	1985	Office	
93	ARQ	–	Culver City 34°01′43″N 118°22′21″W	320 (97.5)	30	2020	Office	Although located near Culver City, ARQ is located within Los Angeles city limits.
94	The Vermont West Tower	–	Koreatown 34°03′41″N 118°17′29″W	319 (97.1)	29	2014	Residential	
95	2220 Avenue of the Stars	–	Century City 34°03′07″N 118°24′31″W	316 (96.3)	28	1966	Residential	
96	2222 Avenue of the Stars	–	Century City 34°03′07″N 118°24′29″W	316 (96.3)	28	1966	Residential	
97	Mercury		Koreatown 34°03′41″N 118°18′34″W	312 (95.1)	22	1963	Residential	
98	6500 Wilshire Boulevard	–	Mid-Wilshire 34°03′49″N 118°22′13″W	312 (95.1)	23	1987	Office	
99	Sheraton Los Angeles Downtown Hotel		Downtown 34°02′52″N 118°15′30″W	312 (95)	24	1973	Hotel	Formerly a Hyatt Regency hotel
100	Alina II	–	Downtown 34°02′45″N 118°15′43″W	312 (95)	28	2018	Residential	Also known as Concerto Tower 2.
101	One Park Plaza	–	Koreatown 34°03′41″N 118°17′36″W	310 (94.5)	22	1971	Office	
102	6300 Wilshire Boulevard	–	Mid-Wilshire 34°03′48″N 118°21′59″W	307 (93.6)	21	1973	Office	
103	Northrop Grumman Plaza II	–	Century City 34°03′44″N 118°24′53″W	302 (92)	19	1983	Office	
104	International Tower	–	Downtown 34°02′48″N 118°15′43″W	302 (92)	23	1985	Office	Also known as 888 International Tower, or First Republic Bank Building.
105	Valley Executive Tower	–	Sherman Oaks 34°09′12″N 118°27′57″W	301 (91.8)	21	1984	Office	Tallest building in Sherman Oaks.
106	12100 Wilshire Boulevard	–	Sawtelle 34°02′37″N 118°28′03″W	301 (91.8)	21	1985	Office	
107	The Carlyle on Wilshire	–	Westwood 34°03′35″N 118°26′19″W	301 (91.8)	24	2009	Residential	
108	Barrington Plaza Building A		Sawtelle 34°02′54″N 118°27′40″W	300 (91.5)	25	1961	Residential	

== Tallest buildings in Greater Los Angeles ==
Greater Los Angeles
- Population: 12,927,614 (2024 estimate)
- Cities included: Los Angeles, Burbank, El Segundo, Glendale, Irvine, Long Beach, Santa Monica, West Hollywood

Number of tall buildings
- Taller than 100 m (328 ft): 94 + 2 T/O (2025)
- Taller than 150 m (492 ft): 31 + 2 T/O (2025)
- Taller than 200 m (656 ft): 13
- Taller than 300 m (984 ft): 2

Number of tall buildings — feet
- Taller than 300 ft (91.4 m): 119 + 2 T/O (2025)

The Los Angeles metropolitan area has multiple high-rise clusters located outside of the city of Los Angeles. Several cities have buildings taller than 300 ft (91 m), most notably Long Beach, which has four.

Rank	Name	Image	City	Height ft (m)	Floors	Year	Purpose	Notes
1	The Tower Burbank		Burbank 34°09′11″N 118°20′34″W	460 (140.2)	32	1988	Office	Tallest building in Burbank. Tallest building in Greater Los Angeles outside of Los Angeles.
2	Shoreline Gateway East Tower	–	Long Beach 33°46′00″N 118°11′00″W	417 (127.1)	35	2021	Residential	Tallest building in Long Beach.
3	One World Trade Center		Long Beach 33°46′04″N 118°11′59″W	397 (121)	30	1989	Office	
4	Pacific Corporate Towers III	–	El Segundo 33°55′09″N 118°23′43″W	360 (109.7)	24	1984	Office	
5	Glendale Plaza	–	Glendale 34°09′20″N 118°15′31″W	353 (107.6)	25	1999	Office	Tallest building in Glendale.
6	Sierra Towers		West Hollywood 34°05′27″N 118°23′39″W	350 (106.7)	37	1966	Residential	Tallest building in West Hollywood.
7	West Ocean Condominiums I		Long Beach 33°46′00″N 118°11′48″W	345 (105.2)	29	2007	Residential	
8	200 Spectrum Center Drive		Irvine 33°39′10″N 117°44′52″W	324 (98.7)	20	2016	Office	Tallest building in Irvine.
9	400 Spectrum Center Drive		Irvine 33°39′15″N 117°44′45″W	323 (98.6)	20	2017	Office	
10	Landmark Square		Long Beach 33°46′03″N 118°11′36″W	312 (95.1)	24	1991	Office	
11	100 Wilshire Building		Santa Monica 33°46′03″N 118°11′36″W	300 (91.4)	21	1971	Office	Tallest building in Santa Monica.
12	Pacific Corporate Towers I	–	El Segundo 33°55′01″N 118°23′43″W	300 (91.4)	20	1982	Office	

== Tallest under construction or approved ==
=== Under construction ===
This lists buildings that are under construction in Los Angeles and are planned to rise at least 300 feet (91 meters).

Name	Height ft (m)	Floors	Year	Purpose	Notes
Oceanwide Plaza Tower I	677 (206)	49	2028	Residential	Located across from Crypto.com Arena. Topped off in 2019 but interior left unfinished. Construction resumed in July of 2026 under the KPC Development Company and Lendlease after the city and developers came to an agreement to settle the outstanding debt and resume work.
Oceanwide Plaza Tower II	530 (162)	40	2028	Residential	11th & Figueroa St. / Across from Crypto.com Arena. Topped off in 2019 but interior left unfinished. Construction resumed in July of 2026 under the KPC Development Company and Lendlease after the city and developers came to an agreement to settle the outstanding debt and resume work.
Oceanwide Plaza Tower III	530 (162)	40	2028	Residential	11th & Figueroa St. / Across from Crypto.com Arena. Topped off in 2019 but interior left unfinished. Construction resumed in July of 2026 under the KPC Development Company and Lendlease after the city and developers came to an agreement to settle the outstanding debt and resume work.
One Beverly Hills Santa Monica Residences Tower	410 (125)	32	2026	Residential	Tallest proposed tower in Beverly Hills. Designed by Norman Foster. Located on the city limits of both Beverly Hills and Los Angeles
One Beverly Hills Garden Residences	369 (112)	28	2028	Residential	Residential addition to Beverly Hilton Complex. Designed by Norman Foster. BH.org Located on the city limits of both Beverly Hills and Los Angeles
Residency at SkyVillage	399 (122)	35	2028	Residential	

=== Approved ===
This is a list of buildings that have been approved by the city of Los Angeles that are taller than 300 feet (91 m). A dash "-" indicates information about the proposal or has not been released.

Name	Location	Height ft (m)	Floors	Purpose	Year	Notes
Olympia Tower I	South Park (1025 W. Olympic Blvd)	853 (260)	65	Mixed-use	–	Approved in 2019. 1000 room hotel and residential building with 879 apartment units. 3 tower development with podium.
Centro Westlake Tower One	Westlake (662 S. Alvarado St.)	600 (183)	55	Mixed-use	–	Approved in 2026. 300 room hotel and residential building. 2 tower development. Above Westlake/MacArthur Park station.
Centro Westlake Tower Two	Westlake (662 S. Alvarado St.)	450 (137)	39	Mixed-use	–	Approved in 2026. 300 room hotel and residential building. 2 tower development.
Olympia Tower II	South Park (1001 W. Olympic Blvd )	653 (199)	53	Mixed-use	–	Approved in 2019. 1000 room hotel and residential building with 879 apartment units. 3 tower development with podium.
Olympia Tower III	South Park (1001 W. Olympic Blvd.)	550 (168)	43	Mixed-use	–	Approved in 2019. 1000 room hotel and residential building with 879 apartment units. 3 tower development with podium.
670 Mesquit	Arts District	388 (118)	34	Mixed-use	--	Approved by the LA City Council in July of 2025, would be a 4 tower development with the tallest reaching 388 feet. Project would include 676,000 square feet of office space, 894 homes, a 271-room hotel, a charter elementary school, and commercial space.
Fourth and Central	Arts District	364 (111)	30	Mixed-use	--	Approved by LA City Council in July of 2026. Project includes the construction of 10 buildings total, yielding 1,589 residential units, 400,000 square feet of offices, 145,748 feet of retail and restaurant space, and parking for 2,426 vehicles.
11th & Olive	South Park (1045 S. Olive St.)	810 (247)	51	Residential	–	Approved in 2021.
The Bloc Tower	Financial District (700 S. Flower St.)	710 (216)	53	Residential	–	Approved in 2025.
Mack Urban Tower I	South Park (1105 S. Olive St.)	606 (185)	51	Residential	2028	Approved in 2025.
1111 Sunset Residential Tower 1	Echo Park (1111 N. Sunset Blvd.)	572 (174)	49	Residential	2028	Approved in 2022.
Mirabel	Miracle Mile (5411 Wilshire Blvd)	550 (168)	42	Residential	2027	2019 approved Luxury Apartments designed by Richard Keating. Art Deco base with street level retail. Currently a Staples office supply store. Portion of the 1930s original building will be preserved. Near new subway station, Wilshire/La Brea station.
JW Marriott Expansion	South Park	450 (137)	40	Hotel	--	Expansion of the existing hotel with new tower. Plans approved for LA Convention Center expansion along with tower in 2018.
Westfield Promenade 2035 SE Hotel Tower	Warner Center (6100 Topanga canyon Blvd.)	502 (153)	28	Mixed-use	2033	Approved in 2020. Mixed-use residential and hotel building.
Wilshire Gate	Koreatown (631 S. Vermont Ave.)	450 (137)	33	Mixed-use	–	Approved in 2018. Mixed-use residential and office. 2018 Approved / Office Space / Condominiums. Floor retail.
1111 Sunset Residential Tower 2	Echo Park (1111 N. Sunset Blvd)	–	31	Residential	2028	Approved in 2020. Former Metropolitan Water District Complex. Designed by Kengo Kuma.
Fashion District Residences	Fashion District (670 7th and Maple St.)	370 (113)	33	Residential	–	Approved in 2017. Designed by Humphreys & Partners Architects. Built by Realm Group and Urban Offerings. Near Santee Court Alley.
Crossroads Hollywood Tower III	Hollywood (SE corner of Highland Ave and Selma Ave)	366 (112)	20	Mixed-use	–	1.4 million square feet of programmed space, including 950 residential units, a 308-key hotel, 94,000 square feet of office space and 185,000 square feet of shops and restaurants. Redevelopment of Crossroads of the World.
Crossroads Hollywood Tower II	Hollywood (SE corner of Highland Ave and Selma Ave.)	387 (118)	21	Mixed-use	–	1.4 million square feet of programmed space, including 950 residential units proposed in 2020, a 308-key hotel, 94,000 square feet of office space and 185,000 square feet of shops and restaurants. Redevelopment of Crossroads of the World.
Crossroads Hollywood Tower I	Hollywood (SE corner of Highland Ave and Selma Ave.)	407 (124)	26	Mixed-use	–	Approved in 2019.
District NoHo Tower 1	North Hollywood (11232 Cumpston St.)	322 (98)	28	Mixed-use	2037	Approved in 2024. A redesign of Metro's North Hollywood station.
Westfield Promenade 2035 SE Residential Tower	Warner Center (6100 Topanga Canyon Blvd.)	336 (102)	28	Residential	2033	Approved in 2016.
Palladium Residences Tower I	Hollywood (6215 Sunset Blvd.)	350 (107)	31	Residential	–	Approved in 2018.
Palladium Residences Tower II	Hollywood (6215 Sunset Blvd.)	350 (107)	31	Residential	–	Approved in 2018.
6000 Hollywood Boulevard	Hollywood (6000 Hollywood Blvd.)	422 (129)	35	Residential	–	Approved in 2025. Replacing Toyota of Hollywood car park, East end of the Walk of Fame.

== Tallest demolished ==
There is one demolished building in Los Angeles that at one time stood at least 300 feet (91 m) in height.

Name	Image	Height ft (m)	Floors	Year completed	Year demolished	Purpose	Notes
Richfield Tower		328 (100)	12	1929	1967	Office	Served as the headquarters of the Richfield Oil Corporation. Second tallest building in Los Angeles upon completion, after the Los Angeles City Hall.

== Timeline of tallest buildings ==
This lists buildings that once held the title of tallest building in Los Angeles.

Name	Image	Street address	Years as tallest	Height ft (m)	Floors	Reference
Braly Building (Note: This building was renamed the Continental Building.)		408 South Spring Street	1904–1928	175 (53)	12	
Los Angeles City Hall		200 North Spring Street	1928–1968	454 (138)	32	
Union Bank Plaza		445 South Figueroa Street	1968–1969	516 (157)	40	
611 Place		611 West 6th Street	1969–1972	620 (189)	42	
City National Tower (Note: The City National Tower and the Paul Hastings Tower are twin towers, both rising 699 feet (213 m).)		555 South Flower Street	1972–1974	699 (213)	52	
Paul Hastings Tower		515 South Flower Street	1972–1974	699 (213)	52	
Aon Center		707 Wilshire Boulevard	1974–1989	858 (262)	62	
U.S. Bank Tower		633 West 5th Street	1989–2016	1,018 (310)	73	
Wilshire Grand Tower		Figueroa and 7th	2016–present	1,100 (335)	73	

== Skylines and aerial views ==
=== City of Los Angeles ===
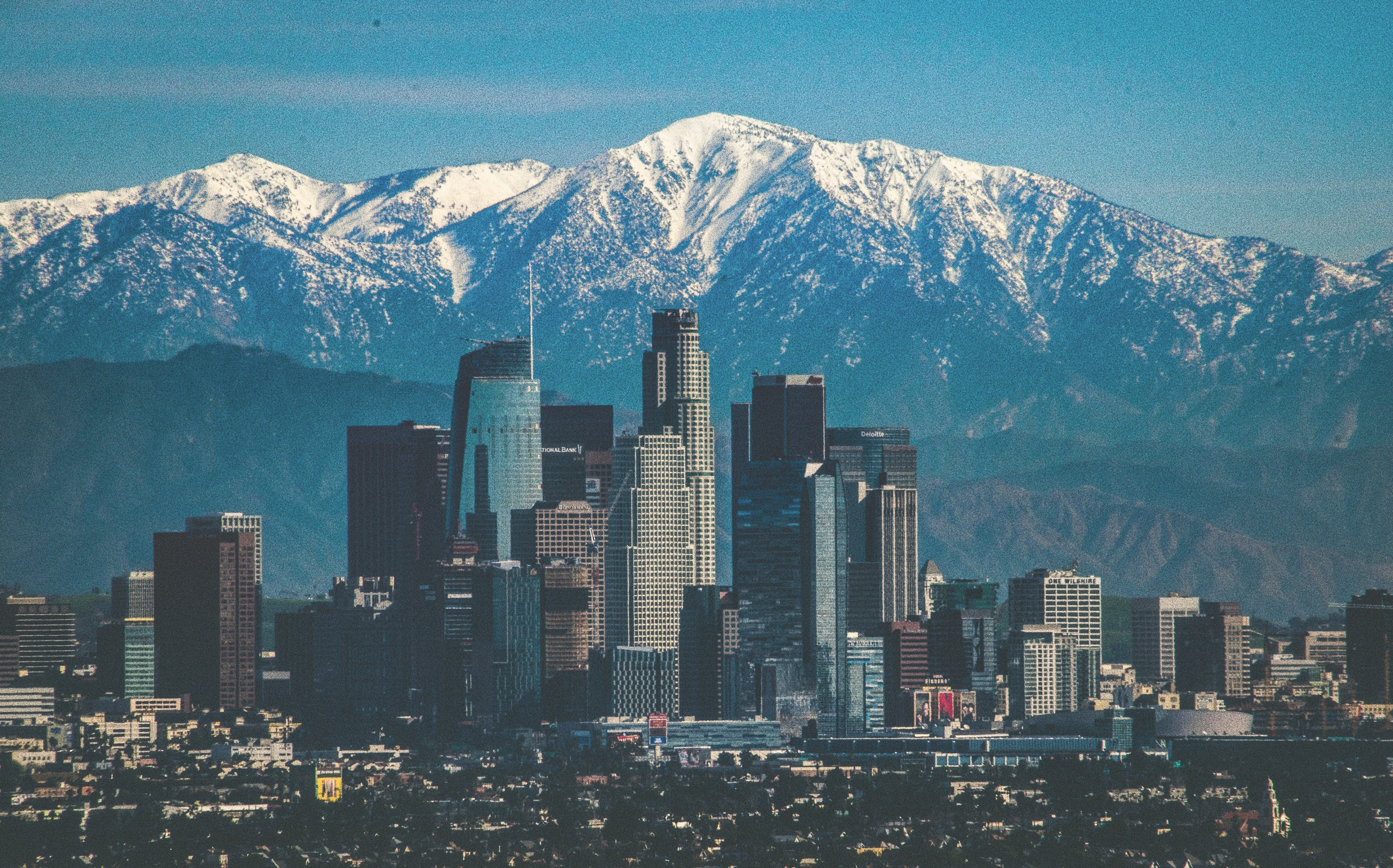
Downtown Los Angeles

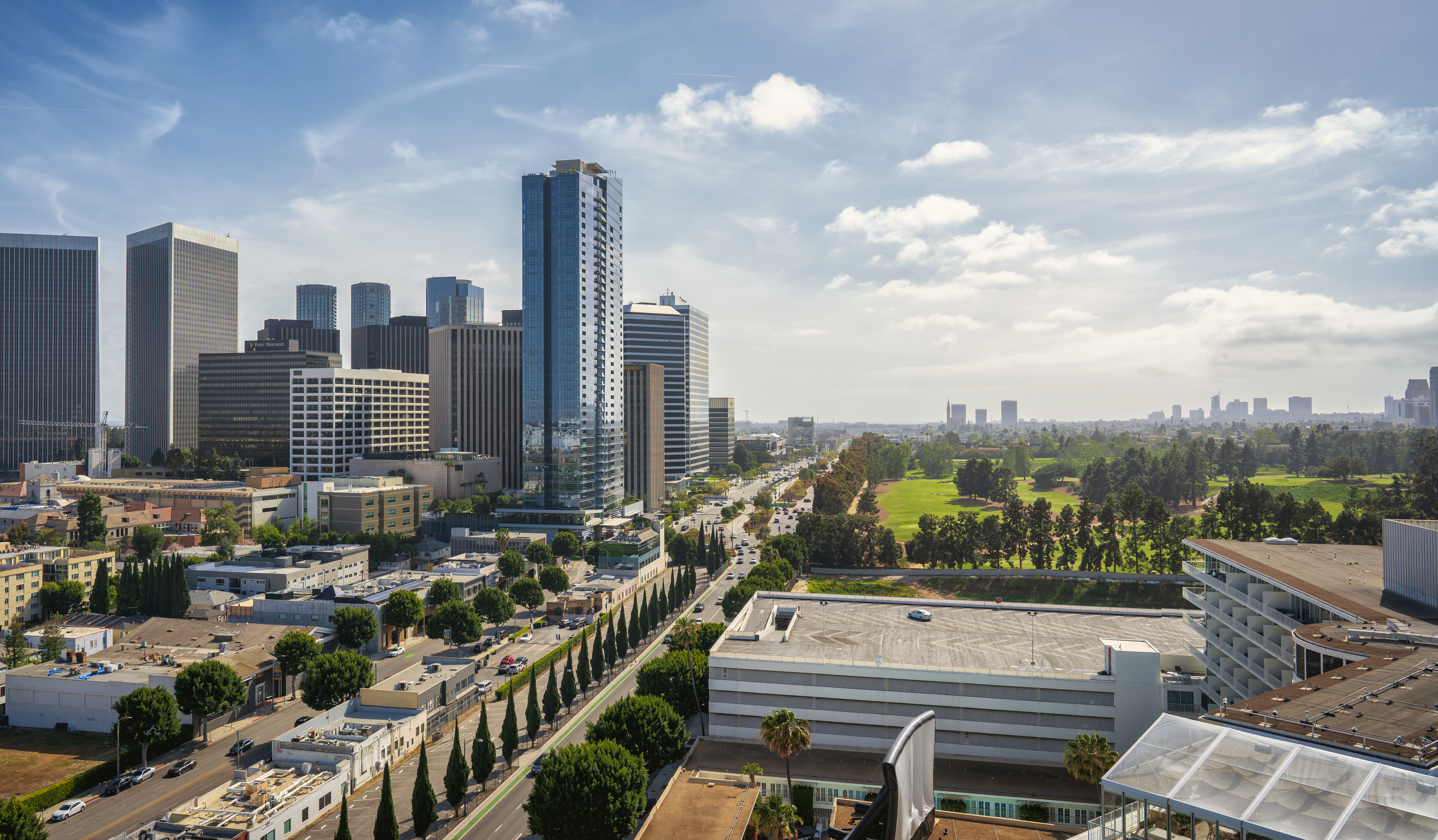
Century City

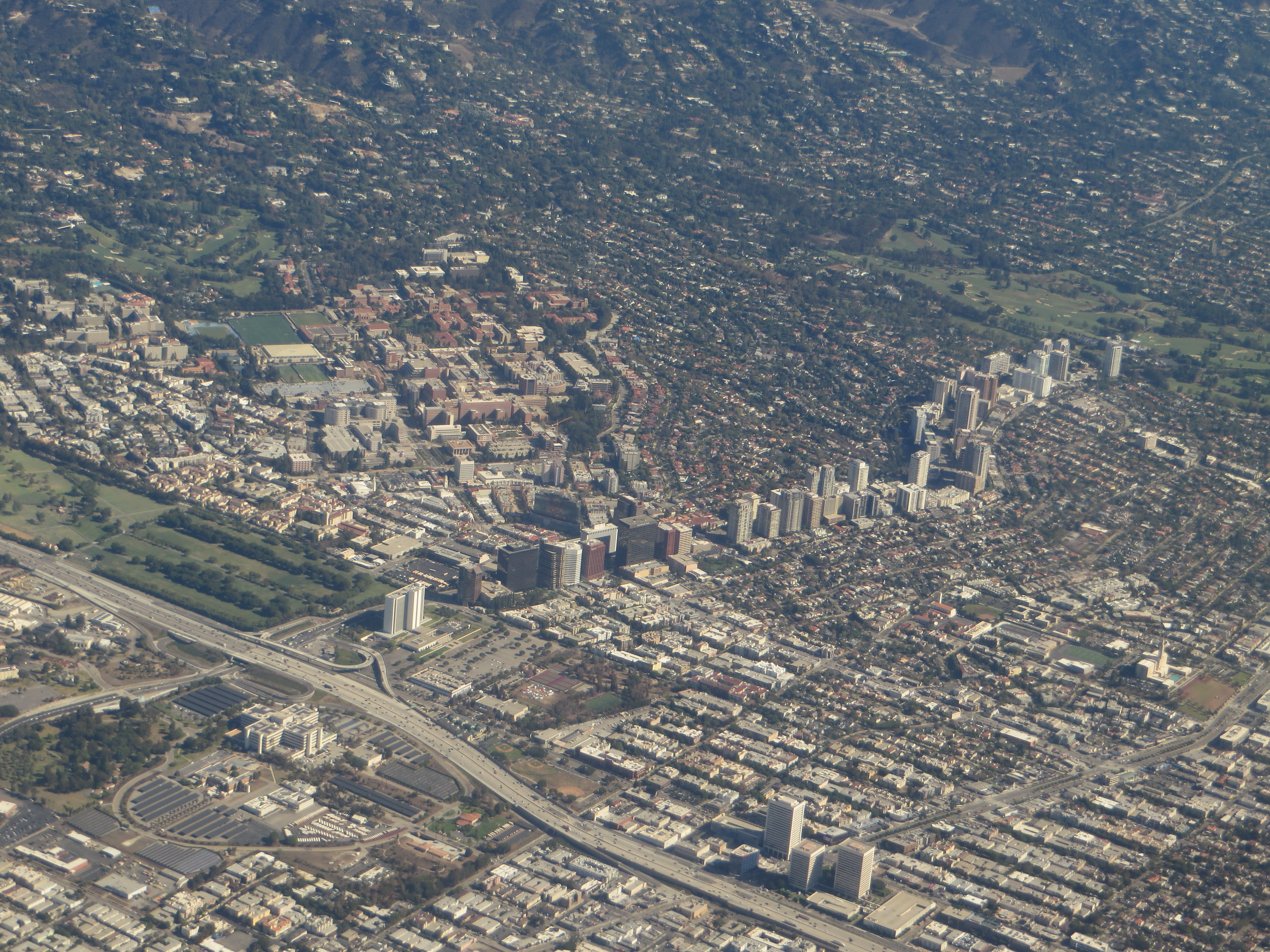
Westwood

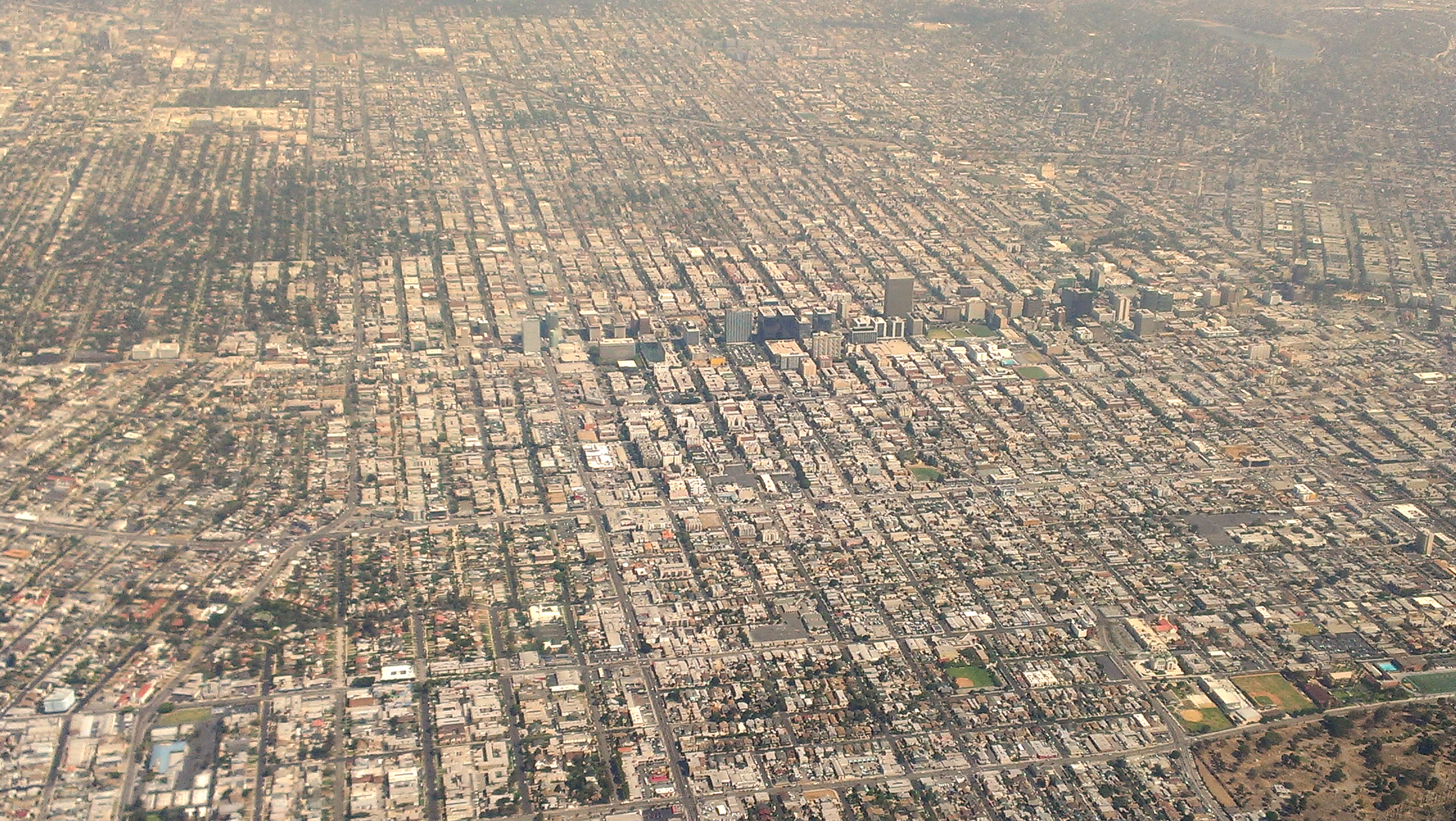
Koreatown

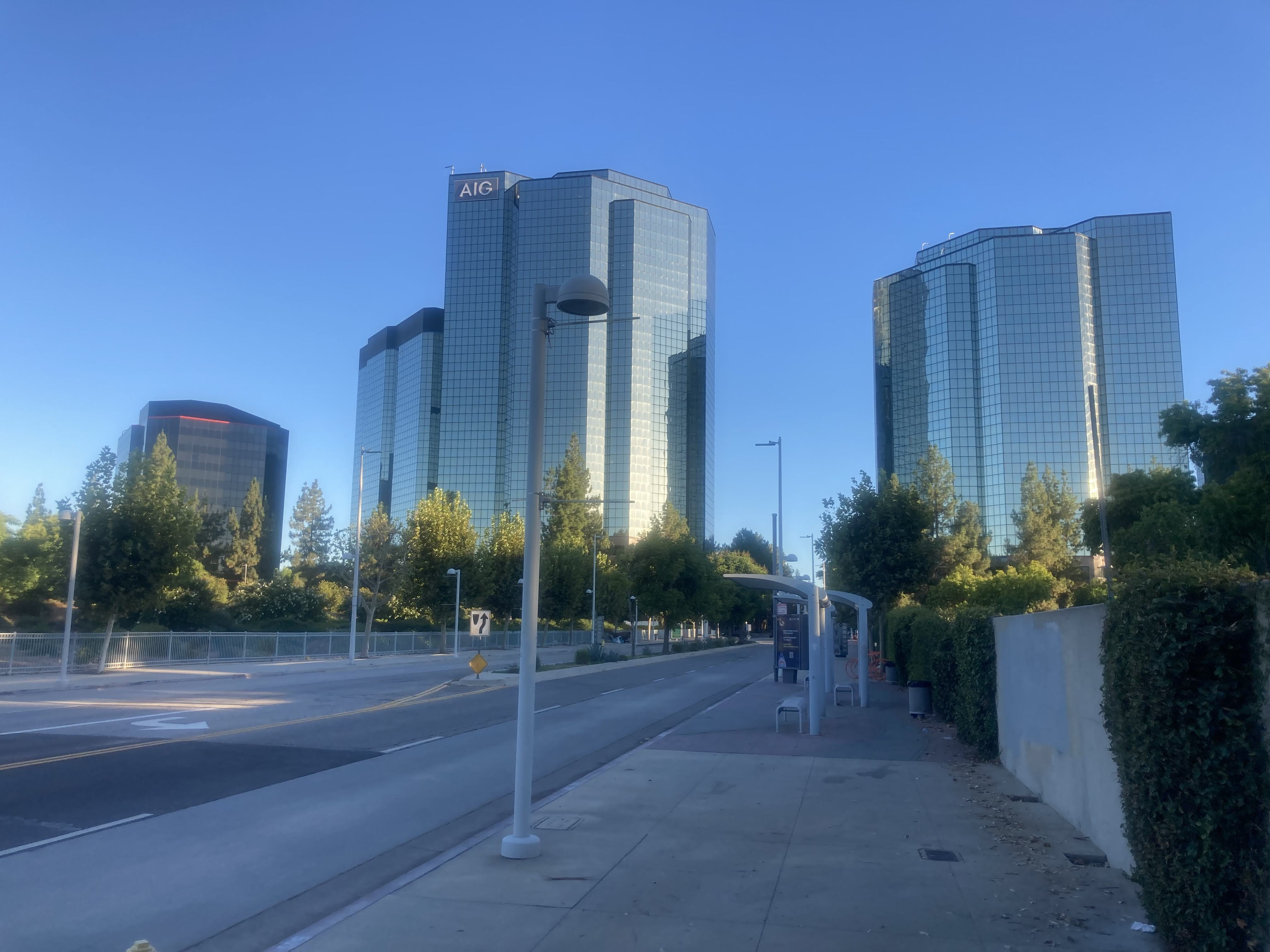
Warner Center

=== Greater Los Angeles ===
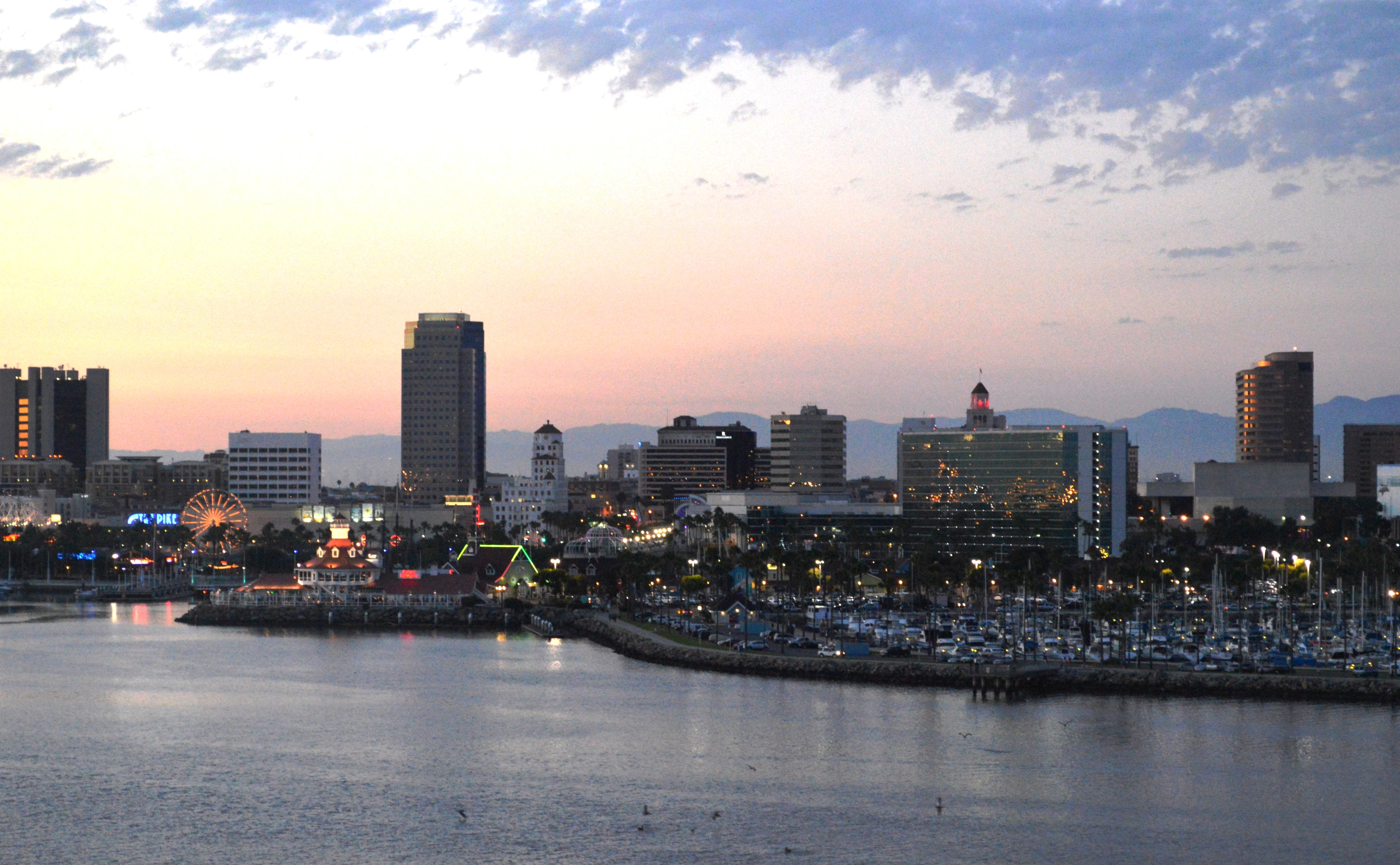
Long Beach

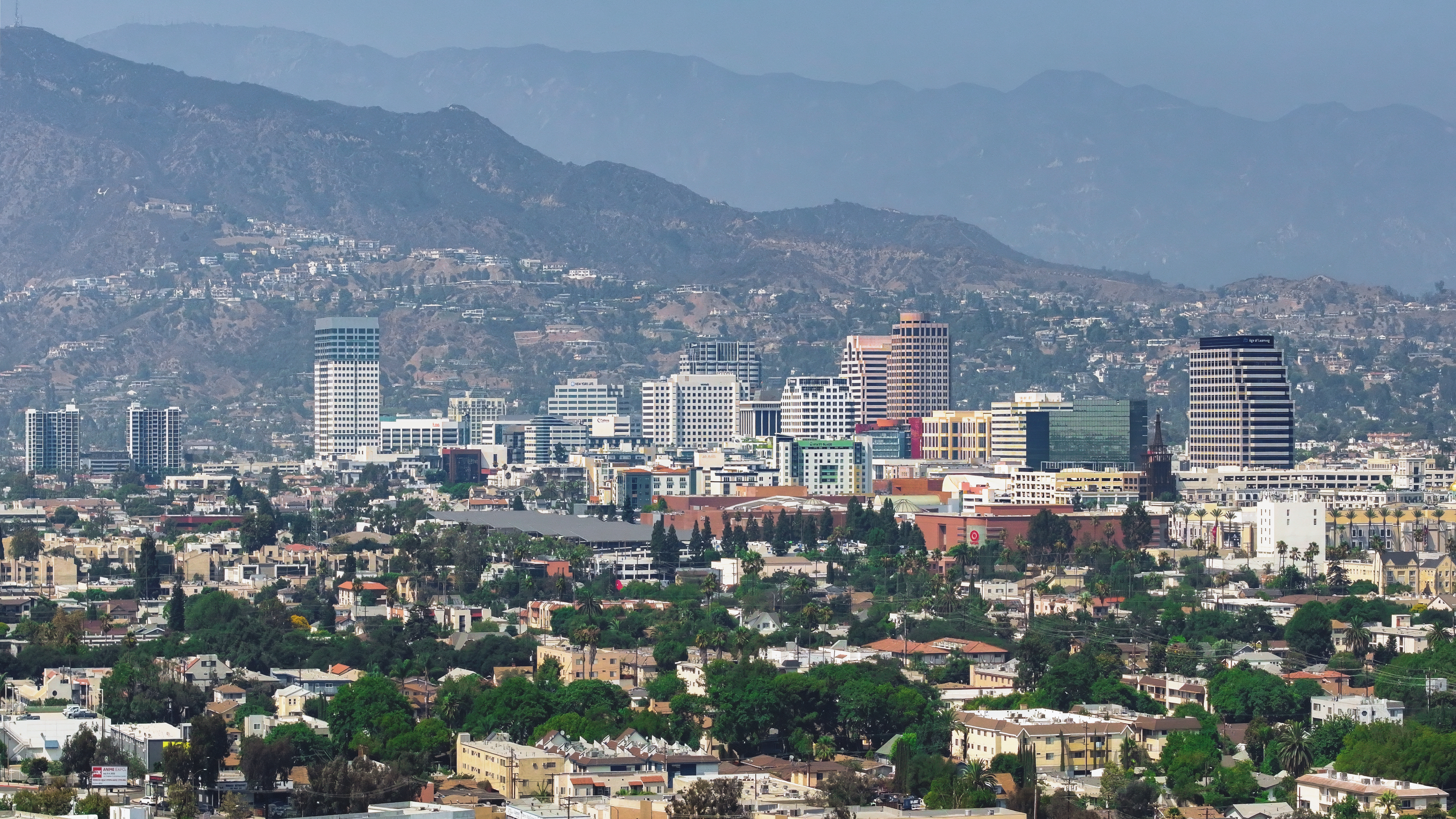
Glendale

== See also ==
- Architecture of Los Angeles
- List of sites of interest in the Los Angeles area – non-tall famous structures
- List of tallest buildings
- List of tallest buildings in the United States
- List of tallest buildings in California
