= Metropolis (Los Angeles) =

Metropolis Los Angeles
- Location within the Los Angeles metropolitan area

General information
- Type: Retail, Hotel and Residential
- Location: 889 Francisco St. Los Angeles, California
- Coordinates: 34°02′54″N 118°15′51″W
- Construction started: 2014
- Completed: 2018
- Cost: $1 billion
- Owner: Greenland Real Estate Group
- Management: Greenland Real Estate Group

Height
- Top floor: 191 m (627 ft) (Tower IV)

Technical details
- Floor count: 56; 7 below ground (Tower IV)
- Floor area: 2 Million Sq/ft

Design and construction
- Architects: Gensler (Phase I), HED (Phase II)
- Developer: Greenland USA
- Main contractor: Webcor Builders, Pankow & Penta

Metropolis, is a residential and retail complex composed of four towers in Downtown Los Angeles, California. The complex is within walking distance of the Crypto.com Arena, L.A. Live and the Los Angeles Convention Center.

Metropolis Complex is composed of one hotel and three residential towers. The hotel opened as Hotel Indigo.

== History ==
Metropolis was originally proposed in the 1980s by previous developers. The towers replaced a parking lot. Metropolis will have 70,000 sq ft of retail. Metropolis Tower I currently holds the 18 story Indigo hotel. Tower III is topped off at 451 ft. 40 stories tall and all residential. Tower IV is the tallest of the four at 647 ft. 58 stories tall.

== See also ==
- List of tallest buildings in Los Angeles
