= 1100 Wilshire =

Skyscraper in Los Angeles, California

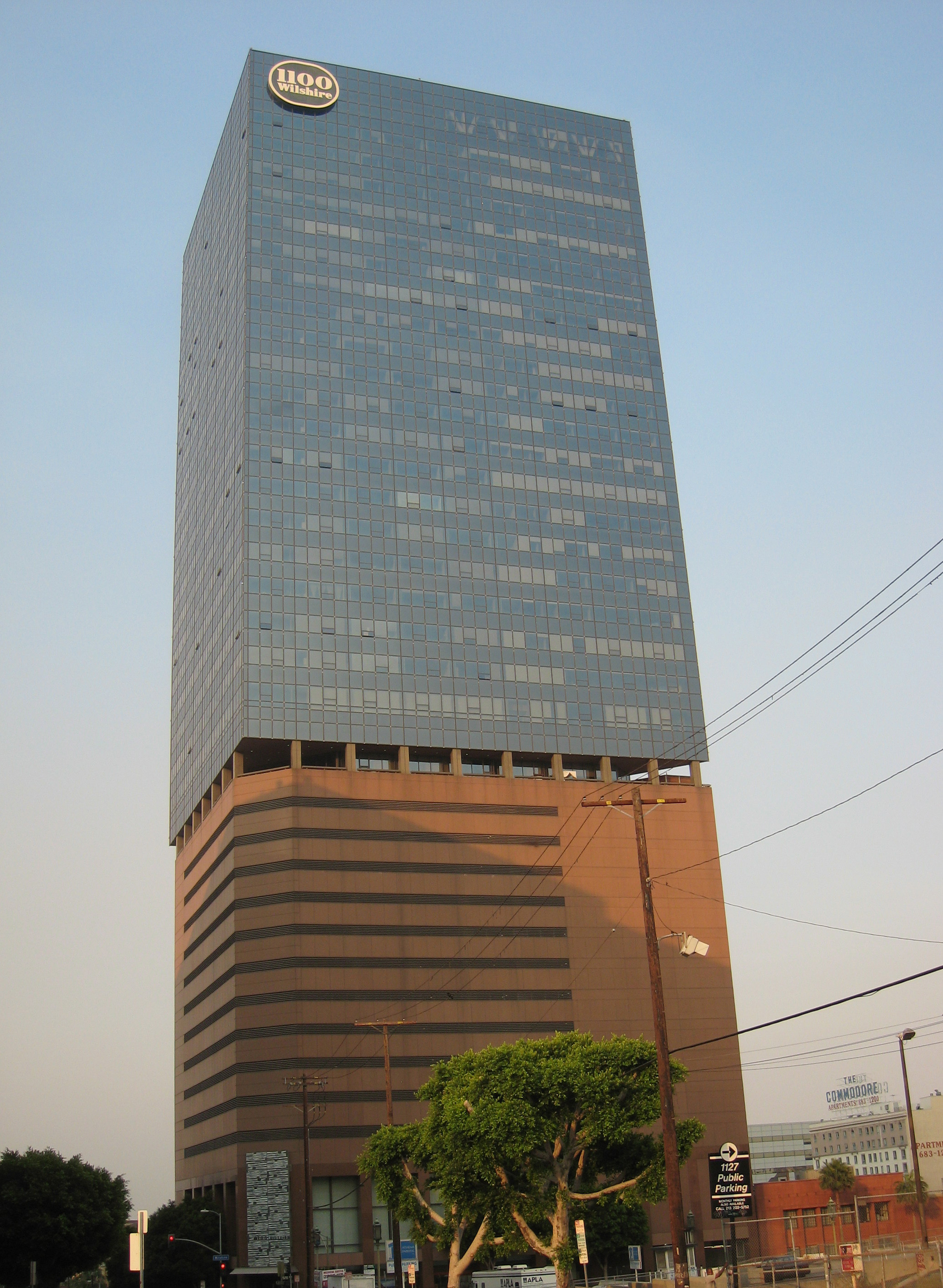
- 1100 Wilshire building
- Interactive map of the 1100 Wilshire area
- Alternative names: WTC Building; Wilshire Financial Building

General information
- Status: Completed
- Type: Residential condominiums
- Architectural style: Modernism
- Location: 1100 Wilshire Boulevard; Los Angeles, California
- Coordinates: 34.0522°N 118.2638°W
- Completed: 1985-1987
- Renovated: Condominium conversion 2006-2007
- Owner: 1100 Wilshire Property Owners Association
- Operator: Seabreeze Management Company

Height
- Roof: 151.18 m (496.0 ft)

Technical details
- Floor count: 37
- Floor area: 35,262 m^{2} (379,560 sq ft)

Design and construction
- Architects: AC Martin Partners; Thomas P. Cox Architects
- Developer: MacFarlane Partners
- Main contractor: Webcor Builders

Other information
- Number of units: 228

1100 Wilshire is a 37-story, 151.18 m (496.0 ft) residential and commercial skyscraper completed in 1987 in the Westlake neighborhood of Los Angeles. It is the 32nd tallest building in the city. The 35,262 m^{2} (379,560 sq ft) tower was designed by AC Martin Partners. The bottom 16 floors are primarily parking, with commercial space on the ground floor/street level. 1100 Wilshire was unsuccessful as an office building and sat nearly vacant for almost two decades. It was purchased by Hampton Development, TMG Partners and Forest City Residential for $40 million, and from 2005 to 2006 the property was converted to owner-occupied residential condominiums with 228 units.

In 2014, the building was used for a promotional stunt by GreatCall. In the ad, John Walsh, the company's spokesman at the time, jumps off the building and parachutes safely to the street, explaining the abilities of the 5Star Medical Alert System as he falls.

== See also ==
- List of tallest buildings in Los Angeles
