= Onni Group =

Canadian real estate company

- Type: Private
- Industry: Real estate development
- Founded: 1965; 61 years ago
- Founder: Inno De Cotiis
- Headquarters: Vancouver, British Columbia, Canada
- Website: onni.com

Onni Group is primarily a real estate development company, headquartered in Vancouver. The company has built a variety of residential, commercial, and rental projects across Canada and the United States for various uses. The company started investing in the US in 2010 by acquiring apartment properties in Phoenix. Since its initial investments in the US, the Onni Group has become one of the biggest developers in Los Angeles.

== Legal issues ==
Onni was fined $24,000 by the City of Vancouver in May 2017 for the operation of illegal short-term rentals at The Level, located at 1022 Seymour Street, despite warnings from the city that date back over a year.

In 2016 Onni were ordered to pay back $1.5 million to the City of Vancouver. An investigation found that City staff approved the DCL waiver for the Charleson Project in error.

In 2018, Onni Group donated $50,000 to José Huizar, a member of the Los Angeles City Council who was under investigation by the FBI, weeks before Huizar voted to allow them to raze a downtown property.

== Projects ==
=== United States ===
- 1120 Denny Way, a pair of 41-story residential highrises in South Lake Union, Seattle, Washington
- Redevelopment of the Los Angeles Times Building
- Redevelopment of the Seattle Times Building

== Other properties ==
- 1411 Fourth Avenue Building, a historic office building in Seattle, Washington
- 121 Boren Avenue North: 40-story apartment building cancelled due to COVID-19 pandemic.
- Universal Horror Unleashed, an attraction located in Chicago, Illinois.
