= Green Silk Road Fund =

- Company type: Investment fund
- Industry: Investment Management
- Founded: 2015

The Green Silk Road Fund (abbreviated GSRF) is an investment fund led by Chinese private entrepreneurs to support projects in China and along the countries of the Belt and Road Initiative. It is unique among Belt and Road Initiative investment funds as private sector support is the predominant driver rather than Chinese policy banks and foreign exchange reserves.

== Fundraising ==
A driving force behind the investment fund is Wang Wenbiao, Chairman of the Elion Group, a firm implementing anti-desertification through methods including developing drought-resistant seeds for agricultural plants like licorice. Wang Wenbiao refers to himself as the "Son of the Desert" and his company found commercial success in combating desertification in the Kubuqi Desert of Inner Mongolia. He has sought to export his anti-desertification business to other countries, and has a track record of acquisitions of buying small and medium-sized enterprises internationally to expand his business.

In addition to Elion Group, other firms contributing capital to the fund are China Oceanwide, Chint Group, Huiyuan Juice, Macrolink, JuneYao, Ping’an Bank and Sino-Singapore Tianjin Eco-city.

The first phase of the fund is expected to reach RMB 30 billion.

== Investments ==
The fund intends to invest in solar power projects, tree planting, and livestock breeding. At the launch of the fund in March 2015, the first project announced was a RMB 5 billion investment in an "ecological solar panel industrial chain" between Beijing and Zhangjiakou, Hebei.
