= Oceanwide Holdings =

Chinese company

Oceanwide Holdings Co., Ltd.
- Formerly: Shenzhen Nanyou Property; Guangcai Construction Group; Oceanwide Construction Group; Oceanwide Real Estate Group
- Company type: Public
- Traded as: SZSE: 000046
- Industry: Conglomerate
- Founded: 9 May 1989; 37 years ago in Shenzhen, Guangdong; 1998 (as Guangcai Construction Group)
- Founder: Shenzhen Nanyou Holdings
- Headquarters: Beijing, China
- Area served: Mainland China; United States; Indonesia
- Key people: Lu Zhiqiang (chairman)
- Products: Real estate
- Services: Financial services; Electricity
- Revenue: ▲CN¥12.671 billion (2015)
- Operating income: ▲CN¥3.168 billion (2015)
- Net income: ▲CN¥2.020 billion (2015)
- Total assets: ▲CN¥118.356 billion (2015)
- Total equity: ▲CN¥10.288 billion (2015)
- Owner: Lu Zhiqiang (69.01%)
- Parent: Tohigh Holding (ultimate); Oceanwide Group (intermediate); China Oceanwide Holdings Group (direct)
- Subsidiaries: China Minsheng Trust (93.4214%); Minsheng Securities (87.645%); China Oceanwide Group (100%); China Oceanwide Holdings (SEHK: 715); Quam (SEHK: 952)
- Website: www.fhkg.com
- Footnotes / references in a consolidated basis

Oceanwide Holdings
- Simplified Chinese: 泛海控股
Transcriptions

Oceanwide Real Estate
- Simplified Chinese: 泛海建设
Transcriptions

Oceanwide Holdings Co., Ltd. is a Chinese publicly traded conglomerate. It was a subsidiary of Tohigh Holding, via intermediate holding companies Oceanwide Group and China Oceanwide Holdings Group.

Oceanwide Holdings is a constituent of the Shenzhen Stock Exchange blue-chip index: SZSE 100 Index.

The company was also included in CSI 300 Index from June 2015 to November 2016. However, the company was often removed and re-entered the index due to low trading volume. The company was also in the "reserve list", a list of candidates for the CSI 100 Index in 2008.

The company was included in the Shanghai-Hong Kong Stock Connect and Shenzhen-Hong Kong Stock Connect. Its Hong Kong–based subsidiary China Oceanwide Holdings was also on the list until March 2017.

== History ==
The predecessor of the publicly traded company (Chinese: 深圳南油物业发展; lit. 'Shenzhen Nanyou Property Development'), was incorporated on 9 May 1989 by Shenzhen Nanyou Holdings. It became a publicly traded company on 3 May 1994.

In 1998, Oceanwide Group acquired the controlling interests in the public company, making the company a SPV for backdoor listing their assets. The company became Guangcai Construction Group (光彩建设集团) until 2005. On 10 December 2005 the public company was renamed into Oceanwide Construction Group (泛海建设集团) (the English name was later renamed into Oceanwide Real Estate Group).

As of 31 December 2005, Oceanwide Group via three subsidiaries, (Note: China Oceanwide Holdings Group (中国泛海控股集团), Guangcai Investment Group (光彩事业投资集团) and Oceanwide Construction Holdings (泛海建设控股); Guangcai Investment Group was later renamed into Oceanwide Resources Investment Group (泛海资源投资集团) and then Oceanwide Energy Holdings (泛海能源控股); Oceanwide Construction Holdings was absorbed by China Oceanwide Holdings Group in 2009.) owned 48.17% shares of Oceanwide Construction Group. It was increased to 70.42% in 2006 and 80.36% in 2008, due to acquiring assets from the parent company in all-share deal. It was diluted to 76.429% in December 2011. In October 2011, the company finally relocated its registered address from Shenzhen to Beijing.

=== Diversification and foreign investments ===
In 2013, the Beijing-based public company started its diversification, which saw the company entered into the United States and Indonesia, as well as entered the financial services industry. It acquired the controlling stake of financial service companies Minsheng Securities in 2014, China Minsheng Trust in 2016, as well as 71.36% shares of Hong Kong–based public companies Hutchison Harbour Ring in 2014 (was renamed into China Oceanwide Holdings Limited, SEHK: 715) and Quam Financial Service Group (SEHK: 952) in 2017. However, the acquisition of CASH Financial Services Group (SEHK: 510), via Oceanwide Holdings International Finance, was failed in 2015. Oceanwide Real Estate Group was also renamed to Oceanwide Holdings, as well as setting up a Hong Kong–based company China Oceanwide Group Limited (中泛集團) for foreign acquisition.

==== China Oceanwide Group ====
China Oceanwide Group Limited was incorporated on 30 August 2013, it became the major parent company of Oceanwide Holdings' assets outside the mainland China.

The acquisition of Hutchison Harbour Ring by China Oceanwide Group was a leverage buyout. Due to the exchange control, Oceanwide Holdings had guaranteed its subsidiary Oceanwide Holdings International, the SPV to acquire Hutchison Harbour Ring of not more than HK$4 billion. (Eventually a HK$3.3 billion was borrowed from a financial services company in Hong Kong, that the name was not disclosed) The final purchase price was approx. HK$3.823 billion, or about HK$0.60 per share. In October Oceanwide Holdings International borrowed a further US$140 million from CTI Capital Management to support the San Francisco project (mentioned below), and 1,650,608,520 number of shares of Hong Kong public company, China Oceanwide Holdings were pledged. The borrowing would be used as inter-company loan. However, in October 2015, the obligation to refurbish the residual HK$1.35 billion loan used in the buyout of China Oceanwide Holdings was transferred from Oceanwide Holdings International to Oceanwide Holdings International Investment, the entity for San Francisco project, making the two inter-company transaction cancel out.

The acquisition of 51% stake of Quam Financial Service Group was another leverage buyout. The price, HK$1.097 billion (HK$1.38 per share) paid by Oceanwide Holdings International Financial Development, was in fact borrowed from Haitong International Securities, by the guarantee of China Oceanwide Group.

In 2014, China Oceanwide Group also acquired a minority stake (about 0.23%) in CITIC Limited (via Oceanwide Real Estate International) for US$100 million (HK$13.48 per share).

The company also acquired a project in Figueroa Central, South Park, Downtown Los Angeles in 2013 (via Tohigh Construction Investment) for not more than US$200 million. In mid-2014, Oceanwide Holdings planned to raise US$720 million to develop the L.A. project. On 10 September, the issue of US$320 million bond (SEHK: 5798) by a SPV: Oceanwide Real Estate International Holding was completed. In August 2015, the L.A. project was sold to the Hong Kong publicly traded subsidiary China Oceanwide Holdings Limited, for an approx. US$190.5 million, excluding the values of shareholder's loan and external debts.

In November 2014, China Oceanwide Group (via Tohigh Property Investment) acquired a Project located in First Street corner Mission Street, San Francisco for US$296 million. Again, it was a leverage buyout, as Oceanwide Holdings International Investment, the intermediate parent company of aforementioned Tohigh Property Investment, planned to borrow US$160 million from Industrial and Commercial Bank of China, which Oceanwide Holdings, had pledged some of the assets located in the mainland China to the bank. In August 2015, US$400 million bonds (SEHK: 5557) were issued by another SPV: "Oceanwide Holdings International 2015 Co., Ltd." for the San Francisco project. In April 2016, China Oceanwide Group borrowed a further HK$1.08 billion from CITIC Bank International and other financial services company, buy pledged the shares of China Oceanwide Holdings Limited.

The Hong Kong listed subsidiaries acquired a project in the New York City from independent third parties and a power plant in Medan, Indonesia from Oceanwide Holdings' parent company China Oceanwide Holdings Group in August 2015.

In November 2015 China Oceanwide Group acquired 80% stake of another power plant project, located in Java, from China Oceanwide Holdings Group for HK$1. The project was still in tender stage, thus had a low accounting value.

In December 2016, Oceanwide Holdings deposited CN¥1.4 billion to China CITIC Bank Beijing headquarters as collateral, at the same time China Oceanwide Group borrowed a further US$200 million from CITIC Bank International, mature in a year. In January 2017 China Oceanwide Group borrowed US$200 million from DBS Bank Singapore branch and HSBC (Hong Kong), which Oceanwide Holdings also deposited Renminbi equivalent to US$211 million and US100 million to their Beijing branch, as a response to the tighten capital control of China.

==== China Oceanwide Holdings Limited ====
Since being acquired by China Oceanwide Group in late 2014, China Oceanwide Holdings Limited (SEHK: 715) became one of the international arms of Oceanwide Holdings. In 2015 China Oceanwide Holdings Limited (via China Oceanwide International Asset Management) acquired 7.90% of the shares of Huiyuan Juice (SEHK: 1886) and subscribed the new H share of GF Securities (SEHK: 1776). In June, China Oceanwide Holdings Limited also lend HK$700 million to Able China Investments, a private company owned by Wong Pui Hoi and was the second largest shareholder of Simsen International (SEHK: 993), in turn 270 million number of shares of Simsen International were pledged. Simsen International was takeover by China Huarong Asset Management in the same year, (by buying all the new shares) which Able China Investments was became the third largest shareholder (fell from the second).

On 5 August 2015, via China Oceanwide Real Estate Development III Limited, China Oceanwide Holdings Limited acquired 80 South Street in New York City for US$390 million. On 20 August, via China Oceanwide Real Estate Development I Limited, the Hong Kong public company acquired the entire share capital of Oceanwide Real Estate International Investment and its subsidiaries (the L.A. project) from the parent company (the Chinese public company), as well as a shareholder's loan of US$24,573,000 to Oceanwide Plaza LLC (the entity to construct the project), for a total of US$215.1 million. In a separate deal, the Hong Kong public company acquired 60% stake of an Indonesian power plant in Medan (known as Mabar Elektrindo) from China Oceanwide Holdings Group, a private company and parent company of both Hong Kong and Beijing based public company for US$37.09 million.

Since 2016, the Hong Kong company, relying heavily on collateral deposited by its parent company in the mainland China, and via China Oceanwide International Capital Investments Management, borrowed US$50 million from Credit Suisse's Hong Kong branch. Another subsidiary, China Oceanwide International Capital Hong Kong, borrowed US$75 million from Hang Seng Bank.

In December 2016, China Oceanwide Holdings' securities began trading in mainland China via Shenzhen-Hong Kong Stock Connect.

On 10 February 2017 China Oceanwide Holdings was removed from Hang Seng Composite MidCap Index as a constituent. Due to the removal, China Oceanwide Holdings was also removed from Shenzhen-Hong Kong Stock Connect and Shanghai-Hong Kong Stock Connect.

== List of properties ==
- Wuhan Center, China
- Oceanwide Center, San Francisco, the United States
- Oceanwide Plaza, Figueroa Central, South Park, Downtown Los Angeles, the United States (owned by China Oceanwide Holdings, SEHK: 715)
- Oceanwide Center, 80 South Street, New York City, the United States (owned by China Oceanwide Holdings, SEHK: 715)

== Subsidiaries ==
- Minsheng Securities (87.645%)
- Wuhan CBD Investment & Development (武汉中央商务区建设投资, 100%)
  - China Minsheng Trust (93.4214%)
  - Wuhan Center (武汉中心大厦开发投资, 100%)
  - Wuhan CBD (Hong Kong) (100%)
    - Oceanwide International Equity Investment (100%)

- China Oceanwide Group (中泛集團, 100%) (Note: Formerly known as Oceanwide Real Estate Group (Hong Kong) between 2014 and 2015, Oceanwide Holdings (Hong Kong) between 2013 and 2014.)
  - Oceanwide Holdings International Capital Investment (100%)
    - China Oceanwide Power International (100%)
      - China Oceanwide Power Development (100%)
        - PT. Oceanwide Pembangkitan Jawa Bali (80%)
  - Oceanwide Real Estate International (100%)
  - Oceanwide Real Estate International Holding (100%)
  - Oceanwide Holdings International Investment (100%)
    - Oceanwide Holdings USA Corporation (100%)
      - Oceanwide Center, LLC (100%) (Note: Formerly known as Tohigh Property Investment, LLC)
  - Oceanwide Holdings International 2015 (100%)
  - Oceanwide Holdings International Finance (100%)
  - Oceanwide Holdings International Financial Development (100%)
    - Quam Financial Service Group (SEHK: 952, 51%)
  - Oceanwide Holdings International (100%)
    - China Oceanwide Holdings (中泛控股, SEHK: 715, 71.44%)
      - China Oceanwide Property International Development (100%)
        - Harbour Ring Plaza, various floors (Shanghai Gang Lu Real Estate Development) (88%)
      - China Oceanwide Property Sino (100%)
        - Harbour Ring Huang Pu Centre, various floors (Shanghai Pu Gang Real Estate Development) (80%)
      - Grand Hover International Development (100%)
      - Jeanwell Development (100%)
      - China Oceanwide International Asset Management (100%)
      - China Oceanwide International Capital Investments Management (100%)
        - China Oceanwide International Capital Hong Kong (100%)
      - China Oceanwide Real Estate Development I Limited (100%)
        - Oceanwide Real Estate International Investment (100%)
          - Oceanwide Real Estate Group (USA) Corporation (100%)
            - Figueroa Central Project (Oceanwide Plaza LLC) (Note: formerly known as Tohigh Construction Investment, LLC)
      - China Oceanwide Real Estate Development III Limited (100%)
        - 80 South Street Project
      - China Oceanwide Real Estate Development IV Limited (100%)
        - Oceanwide Real Estate Investment HI Corp. (100%)
          - Hawai Project (Oceanwide Resort HI LLC) (100%)
      - China Oceanwide Power Investment I Limited (100%)
        - China Oceanwide Power (100%)
          - PT. Banyuasin Power Energy (85%)
          - PT. Mabar Elektrindo (60%)

== Equity investments ==
- China Minsheng Bank (0.369%)

== Financial data ==
Oceanwide Holdings Co., Ltd. (in CN¥)						China Oceanwide Holdings Ltd. (in HK$)					
Year	Revenue	Profit	Total assets	Net assets	Stake in HK listco	Revenue	Profit	Profit to group	Total assets	Net assets	Net assets to group
2015					61.10%	▲189.2 million	▲122.5 million	▲74.9 million	▲8.735 billion	▲6.140 billion	▲3.751 billion
