= Stock Connect =

Stock Connect may refer to:

- Shanghai-Hong Kong Stock Connect
- Shenzhen-Hong Kong Stock Connect
- Shanghai-London Stock Connect
