= 80 South Street =

Canceled skyscraper in Manhattan, New York

General information
- Status: Proposed
- Type: Residential, office
- Location: 80 South Street, New York City, New York, United States
- Coordinates: 40°42′21″N 74°00′16″W
- Owner: China Oceanwide Holdings Limited

Height
- Roof: 1,438 ft (438 m)

Technical details
- Floor count: 113
- Floor area: 817,788 ft^{2} (75,975.0 m^{2})

Design and construction
- Architect: Santiago Calatrava
- Developer: China Oceanwide Center NY LLC

80 South Street was a proposed residential skyscraper in the Financial District of Manhattan, New York City, that had been planned in the early 21st century. The original proposal for the skyscraper, released in 2003, was designed by renowned Spanish architect Santiago Calatrava, and was canceled in 2008 as a result of a declining real-estate market. A new shorter design was planned to be finished in 2016, and China Oceanwide Holdings Limited acquired 80 South Street in March 2016. Following the collapse of Chinese real estate conglomerate Evergrande and the associated Chinese property sector crisis, in October 2021, China Oceanwide began marketing the property at an aggressive discount of more than $190 million below its original acquisition cost to raise funds for its parent entity.

== Site ==
The site on which the building is planned to be constructed is occupied by a six-story red brick building. The existing building, including the side door entrance on Fletcher Street, was used as the set for API headquarters in the short-lived AMC series Rubicon, filmed in 2010.

== Architecture ==
=== Original design ===
The design of the building consisted of 12 four-story cubes stacked on top of one another, cantilevered off a central concrete column standing above an 8-story base. The slender concrete core would contain elevators, fire stairs and risers for plumbing and power. The base was intended to hold a cultural space, such as a museum. The lowest two cubes would hold offices, while the upper 10 cubes were planned to serve as individual residences. Each private cube would consist of about 10,336 square feet (960 m^{2}) of area, as well as an outdoor garden. The residences each had a cost starting at US$29 million, with the top cube costing US$59 million, making them some of the most expensive condominiums in New York City. However, in 2014, Calatrava started a new design of 80 south street to propose for construction in New York City.

The building had a planned roof height of 826 feet (252 m), and the central core was planned to extend as a spire to 1,123 feet (342 m). The tower was originally conceived as the 3rd-tallest building in New York City (after the Empire State Building and the Bank of America Tower).

=== 2019 design ===
Real estate blog New York YIMBY published a tentative design in April 2019. The design was based on plans by China Oceanwide Holdings Limited, which had already disengaged from the project and sold the building site. This plan would have had 1,067,350 square feet (99,160 m^{2}) of space, half residential and half commercial. Uniform Land Use Review Procedure documents showed a possible height of 1,436 feet (438 m) with 113 stories.

== History ==
The design for 80 South Street was first released to the public in 2003. Santiago Calatrava has stated that he took the idea for the building from a sculpture he created in 1985. 80 South Street received approval for construction from the City of New York in February 2005. The project was canceled in April 2008; the developer of the project listed the declining U.S. real estate market as a factor in its cancellation.

A new design of the building without the spire, decreasing the tower to 826 feet (252 m), was planned to be finished in 2016. China Oceanwide Holdings Limited acquired 80 South Street in March 2016, with plans to create a 113-story tower. Demolition permits for 80 South Street and 163 Front Street were filed during early 2017. By 2018, work had stalled due to China Oceanwide's financial difficulties. The site was then listed for sale in early 2019; that June, China Oceanwide received a $175 million loan for the site.

In 2022, China Oceanwide Holdings defaulted on the $175 million loan, and the project has continued to be stalled as well as several other skyscrapers proposed around the country, such as the Oceanwide Plaza in Los Angeles, effectively canceling the project for the foreseeable future.
