= Xiangshawan =

Tourist site in Inner Mongolia, China

Coordinates: 40°14′35.7″N 109°57′18.7″E

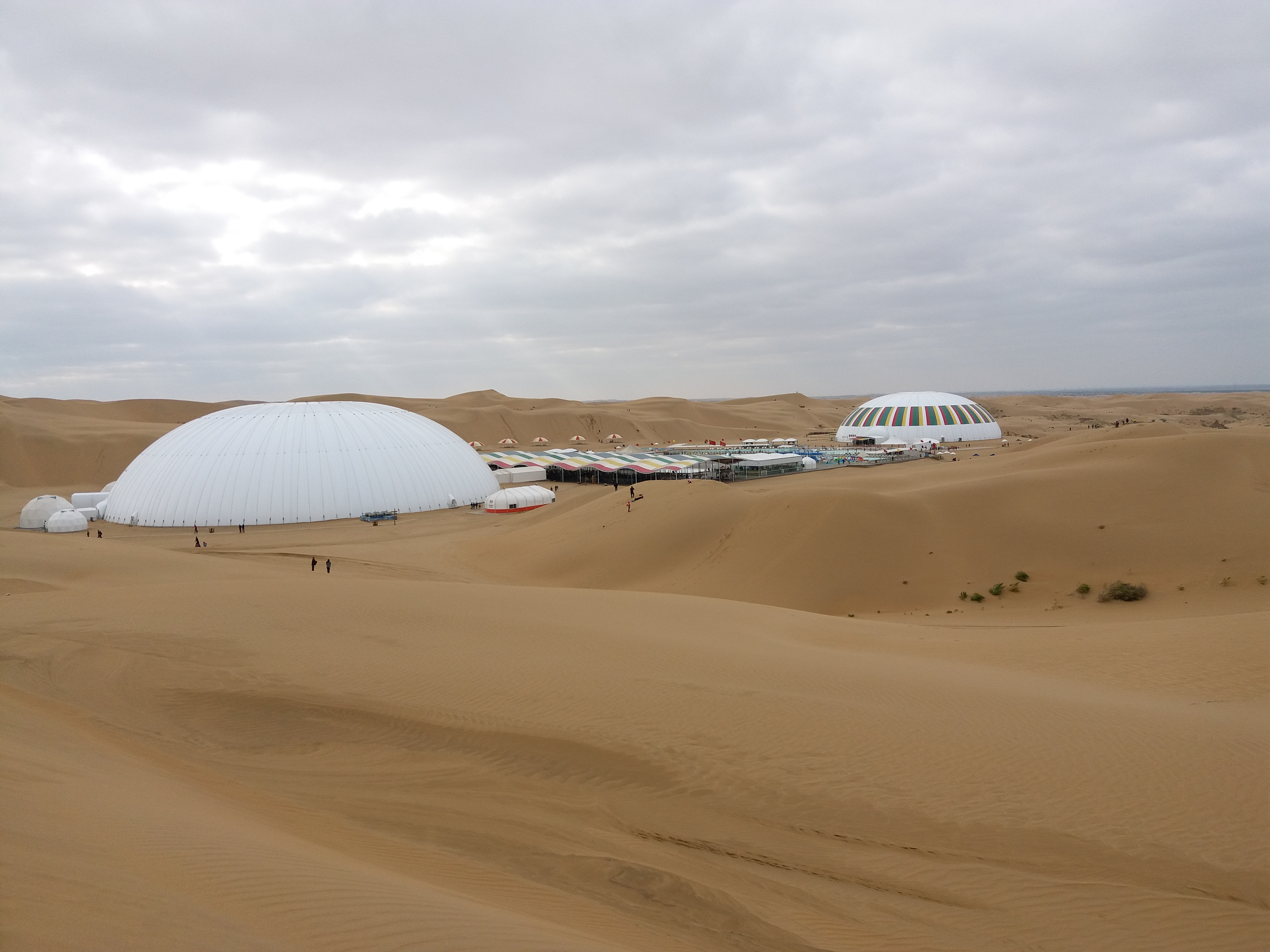
- Nomad Theater
- Traditional Chinese: 響沙灣
- Simplified Chinese: 响沙湾
- Literal meaning: Bay of the Resonant Sands
Transcriptions
Standard Mandarin
- Hanyu Pinyin: Xiǎngshāwān
- Wade–Giles: Hsiang-sha-wan

Xiangshawan, also known as Whistling Dune Bay and by other names, is a AAAAA-rated tourist area in the Dalad Banner of Ordos Prefecture in Inner Mongolia, China. Amid China's general campaign to combat desertification, the mostly unreclaimable site in the Gobi's Kubuqi Desert was developed as the country's first desert-themed tourism resort. It now consists of four "islands" of activities located around the Sand Dune Resort. Mongolian folk culture is displayed, and annual cultural events include an International Photography Week and a sand sculpture festival. Most popular during the summer, Xiangshawan is currently developing a ski resort to attract tourists during the winter months as well.

== Name ==
Former names
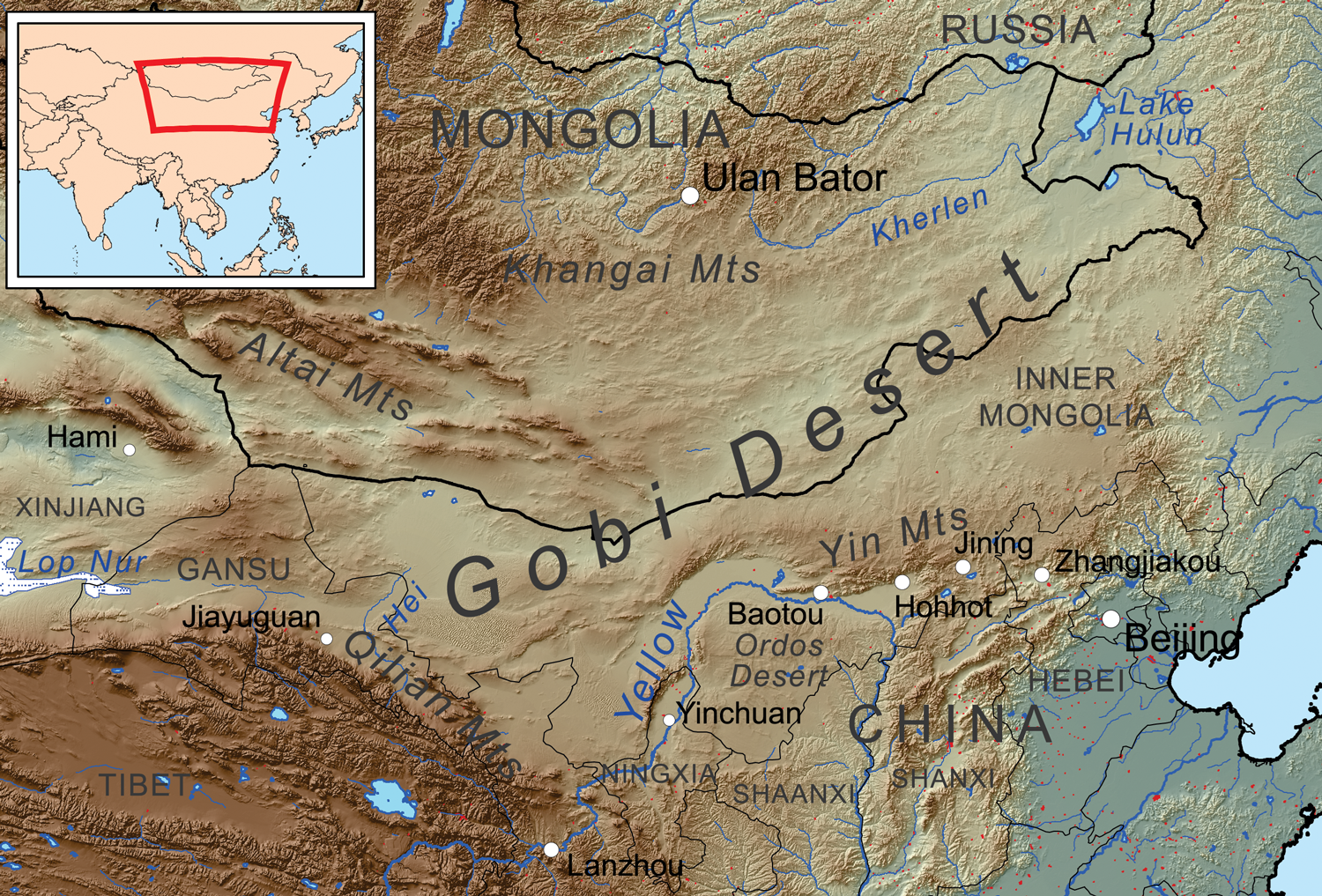
- The Gobi Desert, with the Ordos to its south. Xiangshawan lies just south of Baotou, between it and the city of Ordos.

Guziqu
- Chinese: 姑子渠
- Literal meaning: Old Auntie's Ditch
Transcriptions
Standard Mandarin
- Hanyu Pinyin: Gūziqú
- Wade–Giles: Ku-tzu-ch‘ü

Xiangshawan is the pinyin romanization of the site's Chinese name, written 響沙灣 in traditional characters and 响沙湾 in the simplified form used in mainland China. The tourist area uses the official translation "Whistling Dune Bay", although the name has also been variously translated into English as "Noisy Sand Bay", "Sounding Sands", "Singing Sand Ravine", "Resounding Sand Bay", "Resonant Sand Bay", and "Resonant Sand Gorge". All of these names reference the "humming", "buzzing", or "roaring" sound created by sliding down its tall sand dunes during dry weather.

== Geography ==
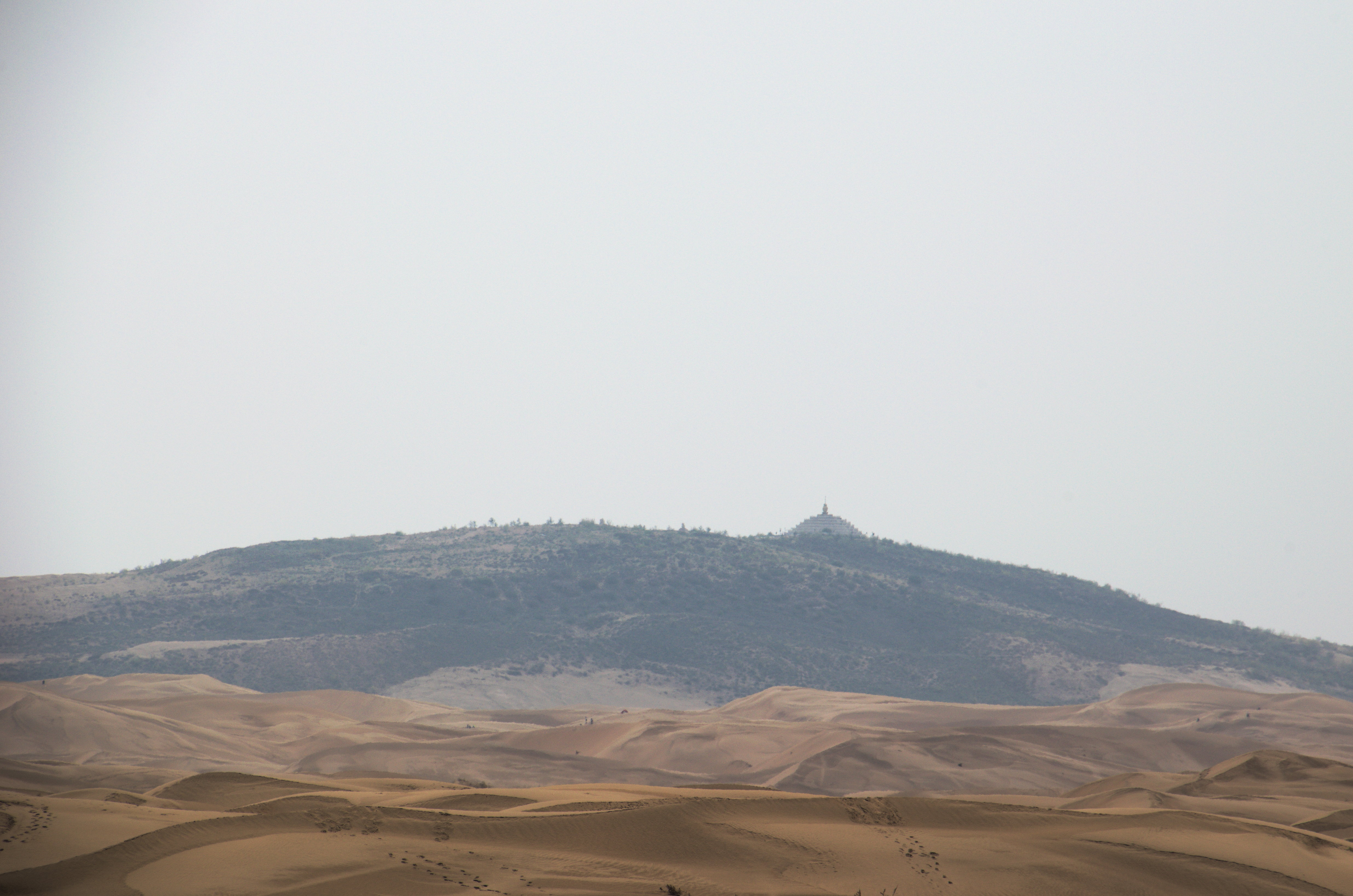
Dunes and scrubland in the Kubuqi Desert, overlooked by a Buddhist stupa.

Xiangshawan is in Ordos Prefecture's Dalad Banner, about halfway between Baotou and Ordos City, within the great northern bend of the central stretch of the Yellow River. The Grain of Sand Resort, reception area, and parking lots lie to the east at the edge of Inner Mongolia's reclaimed desert. The rest of Xiangshawan lies at the far eastern corner of the Kubuqi Desert (t 庫布其沙漠, s 库布其沙漠, Kùbùqí Shāmò), which forms the northern half of the Ordos Desert, which itself forms the southwestern portion of the Gobi Desert. The sand is mostly very fine and soft, and the wind-sculpted sand dunes in the resort can reach over 90 meters (300 ft) high.

The resort is separated from the park's reception area and main roads by the valley of the Sasol River (索沙河, Suǒshā Hé), formerly known as the Laotai (牢太河, Láotài Hé). It is also sometimes known as the Hantai (罕台河, Hǎntāi Hé).

Xiangshawan is about 5 kilometers (3 mi) away from Dalad Banner's Wayao Village and about 50 kilometers (31 mi) south of Baotou.

=== Climate ===
The area around Xiangshawan is a cold semi-arid climate (Köppen BSk) with hot summers; cold, long, and very dry winters; and strong winds, particularly in spring. Most rain that occurs falls in the summer between July and September, with very little naturally occurring snowfall in the winter. Because of the arid climate, bottled water and moisturizing lotion are also strongly advised. The arid climate and relatively high elevation can also produce large differences in temperature between day and nighttime, so a supply of warm clothing is advisable even in the summer when staying overnight. At Xiangshawan, the average temperature in spring is about 4.2 °C (39.6 °F), in summer about 25 °C (77 °F), in the fall about 22 °C (72 °F), and in the winter about −15 °C (5 °F). For the 30 years prior to 2000, the monthly data for the area including nearby Baotou and Ordos were roughly:

Climate data for Xiangshawan Region
Month	Jan	Feb	Mar	Apr	May	Jun	Jul	Aug	Sep	Oct	Nov	Dec	Year
Record high °C (°F)	8 (46)	16 (61)	20 (68)	34 (93)	36 (97)	36 (97)	39 (102)	37 (99)	35 (95)	27 (81)	19 (66)	10 (50)	39 (102)
Mean daily maximum °C (°F)	−4 (25)	0 (32)	6 (43)	16 (61)	22 (72)	27 (81)	28 (82)	26 (79)	21 (70)	14 (57)	5 (41)	−3 (27)	13 (56)
Daily mean °C (°F)	−11 (12)	−7 (19)	0 (32)	9 (48)	16 (61)	20 (68)	22 (72)	20 (68)	14 (57)	7 (45)	−2 (28)	−9 (16)	7 (44)
Mean daily minimum °C (°F)	−16 (3)	−12 (10)	−6 (21)	2 (36)	9 (48)	13 (55)	16 (61)	15 (59)	9 (48)	2 (36)	−7 (19)	−13 (9)	1 (34)
Record low °C (°F)	−31 (−24)	−29 (−20)	−23 (−9)	−11 (12)	−5 (23)	2 (36)	9 (48)	4 (39)	−2 (28)	−13 (9)	−22 (−8)	−25 (−13)	−31 (−24)
Source: Weather China

== History ==
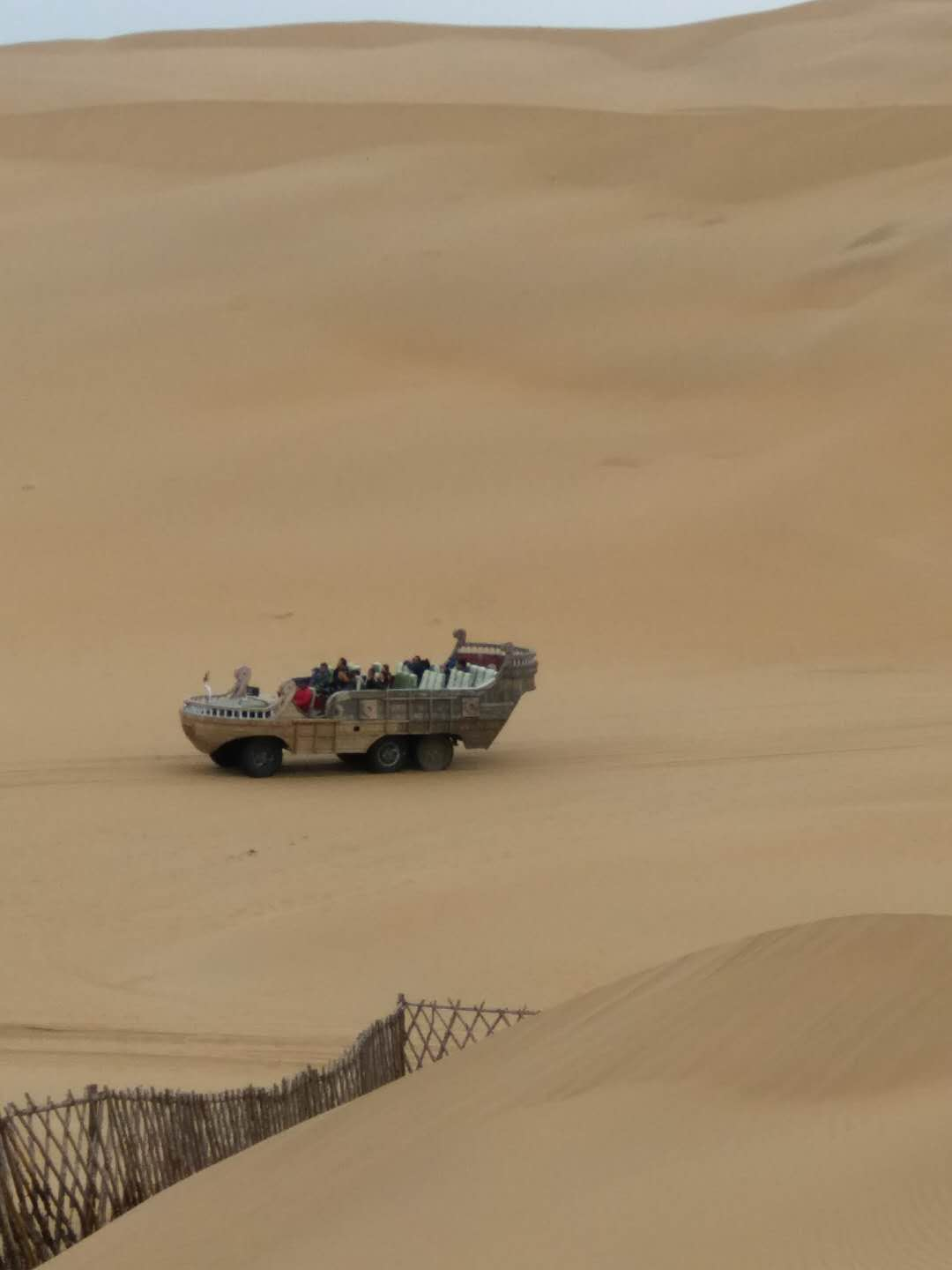
One of the nautically-themed shuttle buses at the resort

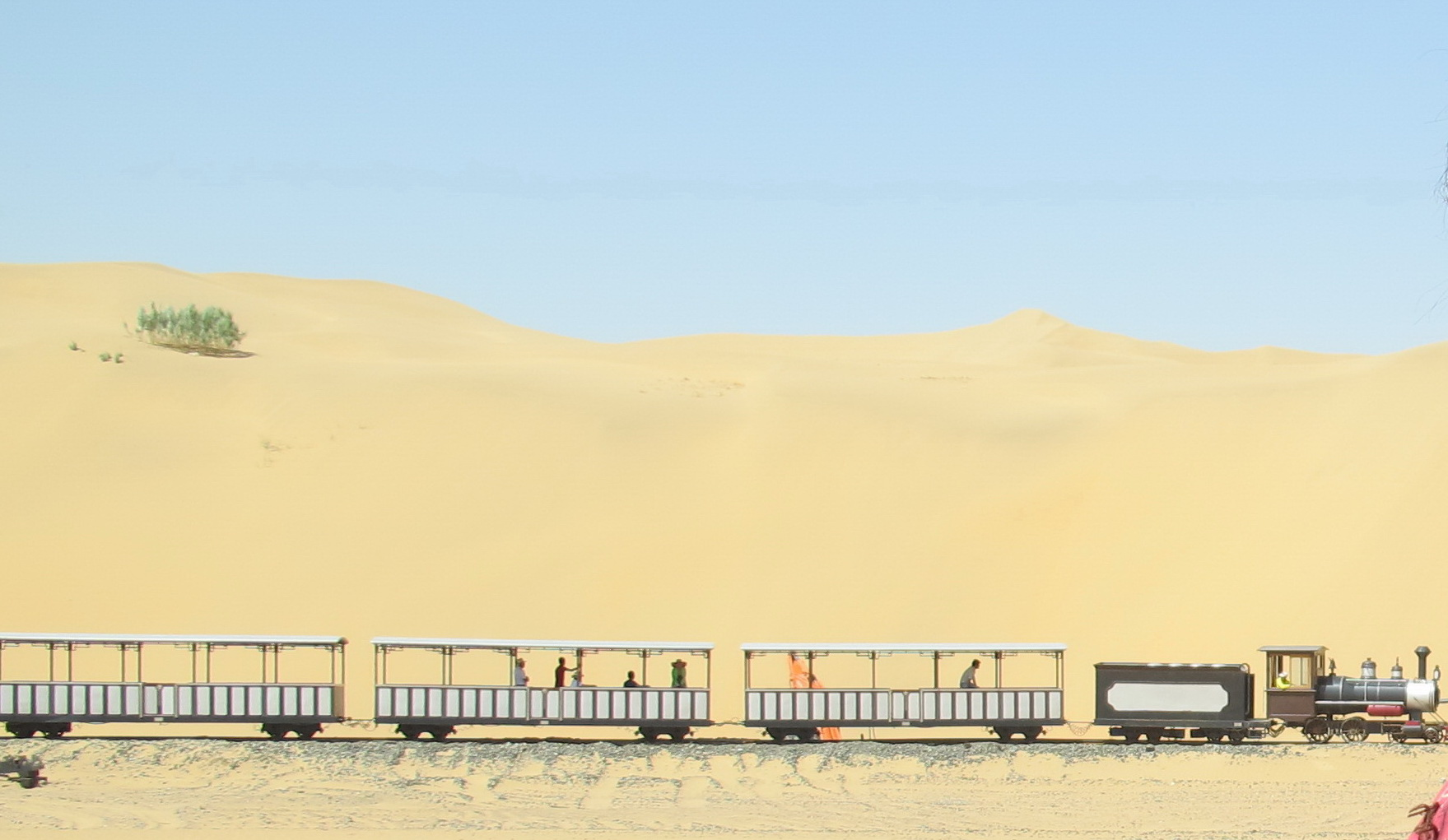
Xiangshawan's train

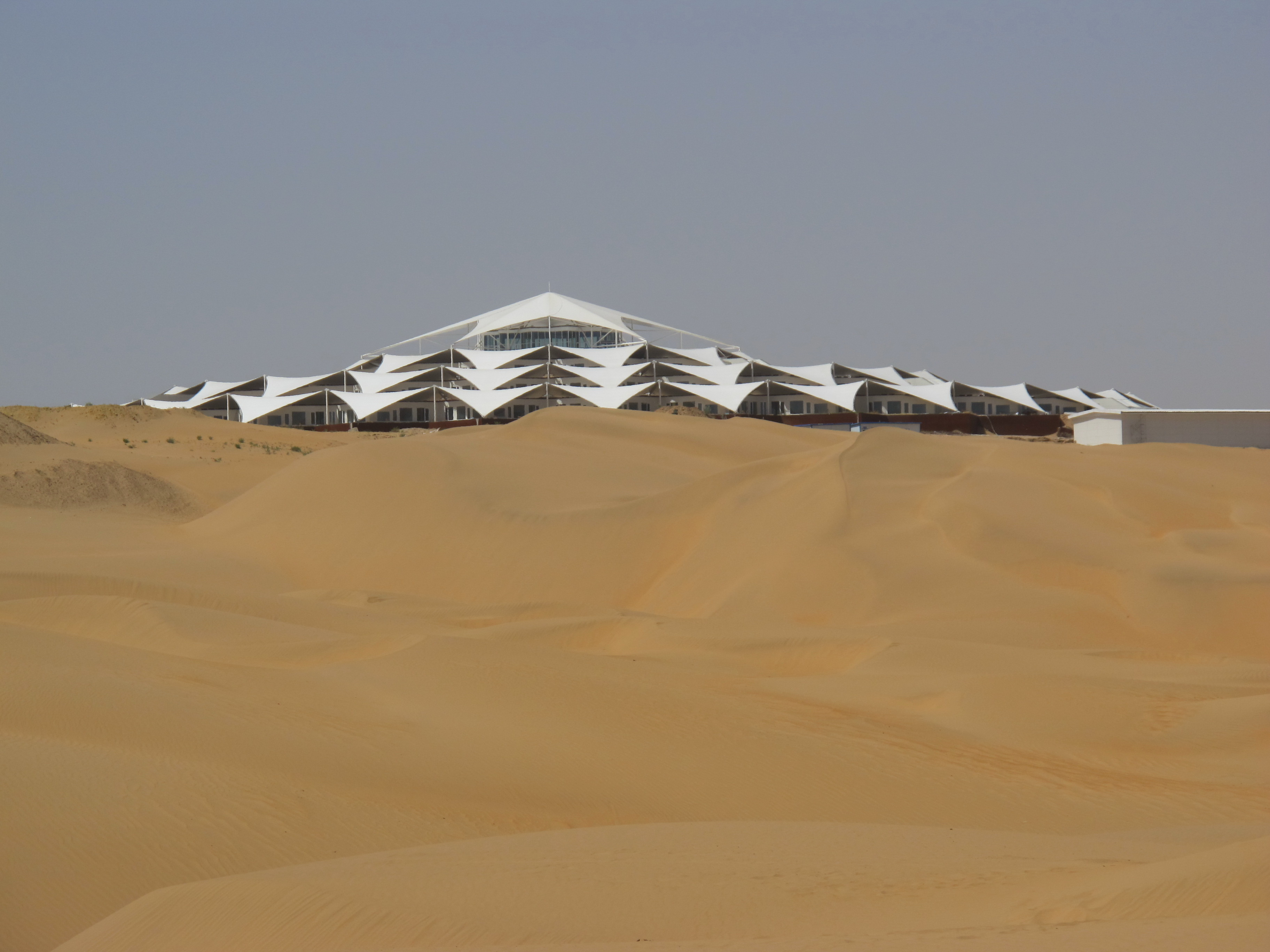
Desert Lotus Hotel (2013)

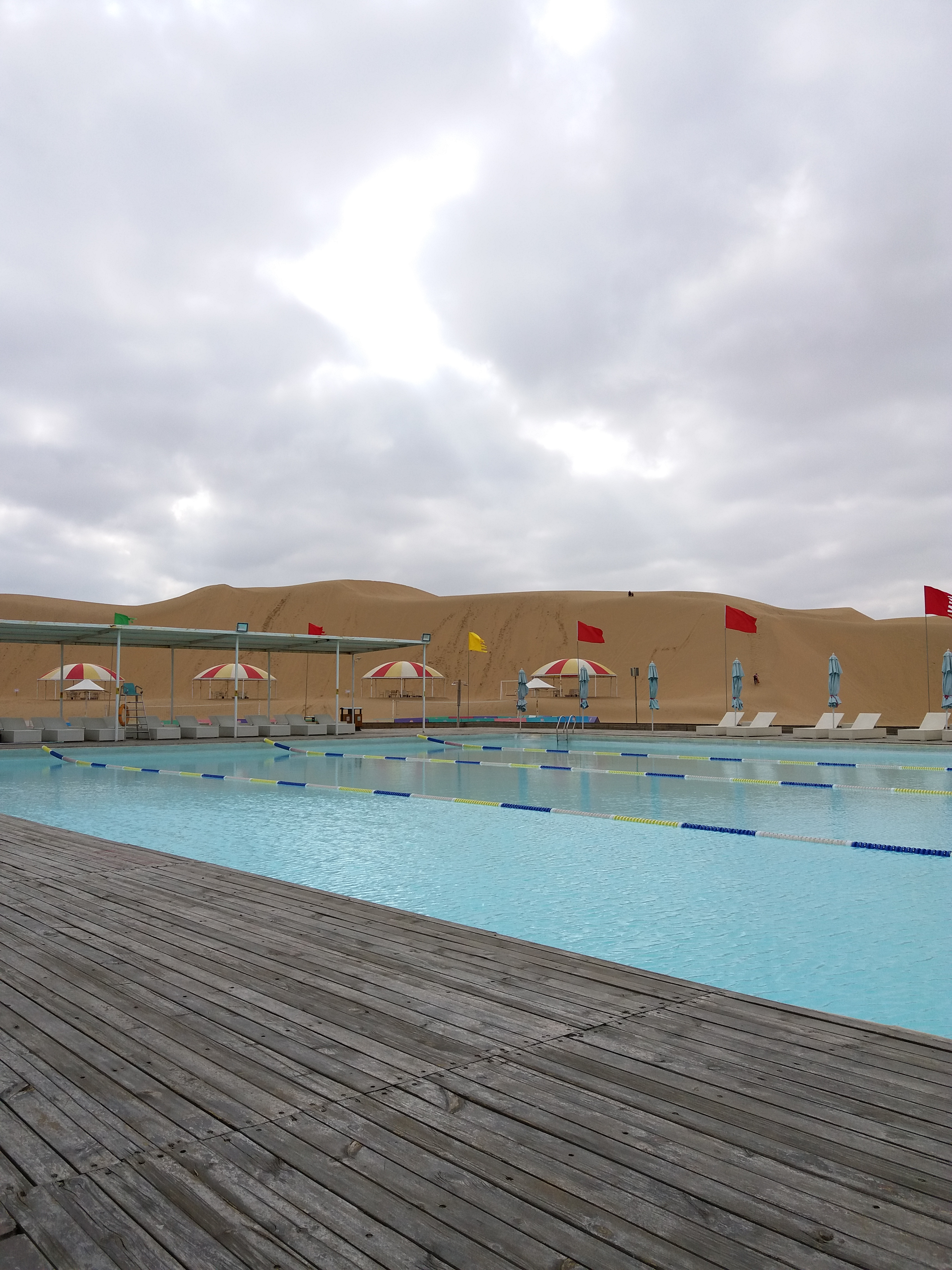
One of Xiangshawan's swimming pools

In the 1950s and 1960s, what is now the entrance area to Xiangshawan was the small settlement of Guziqu; the tourist area itself was barren waste.

The area received few visitors before the development of the tourist resort area, which was part of a general project to develop the Ordos and combat the Kubuqi's desertification. Xiangshawan opened c. 1999 as China's first desert resort and remains its largest. With Xiangshawan preserving an area of unreclaimable desert, other districts around it were planted with licorice and other herbs to begin improving the soil and returning it to its former grassland state. (China became the first country in the world to achieve annual shrinkage in its desert area in the early 21st century.) It began hosting a weeklong international photography convention around 2009. The China National Tourism Administration granted the location AAAAA status in 2011, after a four-year campaign. In 2012, it was used as a venue for the 2012 Miss World competition, which was principally based in Ordos that year. The Desert Lotus Hotel in the Liansha Island area was completed in March 2013 and, in 2014, it hosted the International Mongolian Beauty Pageant. In 2015, it received additional funds and privileges from the provincial government as part of a three-year tourism development program.

The site can accommodate about 10,000 guests at any one time.Hou (2015) In 2016, Xiangshawan welcomed almost 810,000 visitors, around 770,000 during the summer and the rest throughout the other seasons of the year. The resort greatly increased local living standards, which saw some household incomes rise from around 25,000 RMB each year as herders or corn farmers to over 100,000 RMB each year selling goods to the area's tourists. The five desert resorts in Dalad Banner employed over 1000 workers in about 100 households in 2016.

== Layout ==
The parking lot and ticket counter are separated from the main resort area by the Sasol Valley. Visitors can traverse the valley on foot or by riding either of two chairlift-style cable cars. On the other side, Xiangshawan is divided into five main themed areas called "islands", connected by boat-style roofless shuttle buses and other forms of transportation. They host around 100 different activities and sights, including sandboarding, scaling ladders, zorbing, horse and sand boat riding, and golf.

=== Sand Dune Resort ===
The Sand Dune Resort, also known as the Grain of Sand Resort (一粒沙度假村, Yīlìshā Dùjià Cūn), is the reception area to the east of the Sasol Valley. It includes a hotel, restaurant, shopping area, tourist center, fitness center with a large pool, clinic, bank, and police and bus stations. There are Chinese dramas and performances by fire breathers in the evenings. It and the adjacent parking lot host the two separate cable cars over the river valley; the cableway near the shopping center goes to the sand slides at Xiangshawan Port and the cableway nearer the parking lot goes to the Fusha Island area.

=== Xiangshawan Port ===
Xiangshawan Port (t 響沙灣港, s 响沙湾港, Xiǎngshāwān Gǎng) is the site of the resort's most popular attraction, a slide down a 90–110 m (300–360 ft), 45° sand dune that in dry weather produces the area's namesake singing sand. (The angle had been as much as 75° in the early days of the park.) The best conditions for the singing sand are produced after thirty consecutive days without rain; a recent shower can dull the sound entirely. Under optimal conditions, the sound produced by a single person is a hum similar to a frog, bugle, or drumbeat; many people sliding at once can produce roars as loud as a low-flying plane or large bell, as the surface of the dune vibrates beneath them. "Sand socks" (t 沙韤, s 沙袜, shāwà) used to prevent the area's fine powdery sand from getting into one's shoes or boots are also rented in this area, although some local guides can endure even the midsummer heat barefoot. Paths run north to the Xiansha Island area and south to the Fusha Island area; to the west, one can board the train to the Yuesha and Liansha Island areas.

=== Xiansha Island ===
Xiansha Island (t 仙沙島, s 仙沙岛, Xiānshādǎo) is geared towards athletic pursuits, including tightrope walking, sandsurfing and sandbiking, desert volleyball and soccer, and ziplines. There are swings and a playground for children. Apart from the sports facilities, there is also the Guolao Theater and juggling performances, dune buggy and ATV rides, as well as a market and snack street. Apart from the trail to Xiangshawan Port, there is a camel caravan that leads to the Yuesha Island area.

=== Yuesha Island ===
Yuesha Island (t 悦沙島, s 悦沙岛, Yuèshādǎo) is the location of the resort's sandcastles and sand art, both those made by tourists and a large gallery of major works, the Desert Palace of Fine Arts. There are more children's, soccer, and volleyball areas, as well as swimming pools, the Rainbow Theater, and professional gymnastic, acrobatic, and hiphop performances. A "desert beach" area includes beach umbrellas and space for sun and sandbathing during the day and stargazing at night. There are camel caravans to the Xiansha Island area to the east; to the south, the miniature train reaches Xiangshawan Port and the Liansha Island area. The train also passes by an outdoor performance exhibiting traditional Mongolian life on the steppe.

=== Liansha Island ===
Liansha Island (t 蓮沙島, s 莲沙岛, Liánshādǎo) consists of the Desert Lotus Hotel and its associated outdoor facilities. The 30,000-square-meter (320,000 sq ft) hotel was designed by PLaT Architects. Unable to use traditional foundations, the architects fixed the structure to the fluid sands by using underground steel panels and supports; the hotel thus floats like a boat upon the sands, which stabilize it. Load-bearing walls reduce the pressure transferred to the base. They also employed local materials in the design, using the area's sand to construct its wall covering. The resort has two swimming pools, a basketball court, pool tables, and putting greens. It occasionally holds fireworks displays at night. It employs three large banks of photovoltaic panels for its electricity.

=== Fusha Island ===
Fusha Island (t 福沙島, s 福沙岛, Fúshādǎo) is focused on Mongolian culture. It includes a yurt, oboo, archery range, oxcart rides, Mongolian cuisine and folk dancing by the light of bonfires. Other items include the Blessing Island Hotel with its two pools and volleyball and soccer facilities. Fusha Island can access the other areas by shuttle bus; there is also a trail to the Xiangshawan Port and a cable car across the river valley to the Sand Dune Resort and parking lot.

=== Xiangshawan Ski Resort ===
Xiangshawan Ski Resort is a project to improve the location's desirability throughout the year. It opens its slopes in the second week of December. Because of the region's generally dry winter climate, it typically uses artificial snow. There are two gentle slopes for beginners, a steeper intermediate-level slope for more advanced skiers, and a designated area for children and others to play in the snow. Altogether, the snow covers about 110,000 m^{2} (1,200,000 sq ft).

Other winter activities include riding snowmobiles, camels, sleds, and sleighs.

== Activities ==
The site's three chief cultural brands are its International Photography Week in mid-July, its sand sculpture festival, and its Ordos wedding performances in the Fusha Island area. Xiangshawan's hot air ballooning area is also used as a leg in the Ordos Hot Air Balloon Festival.

== Transportation ==
Xiangshawan is about 3 kilometers (1.9 mi) away from the G65 Baotou–Maoming Expressway. It can be reached from Baotou by two buses departing from Donghe Station. The bus to Yiming includes a stop at nearby Wayao Village; the bus to Daqi stops farther away, but permits using a taxi to reach the resort.

== See also ==
- Mongolian death worm
