= Warner Bros. Studio Store =

Defunct chain of retail stores selling Warner Bros. products

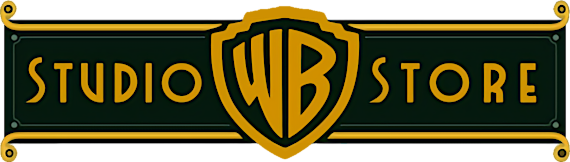

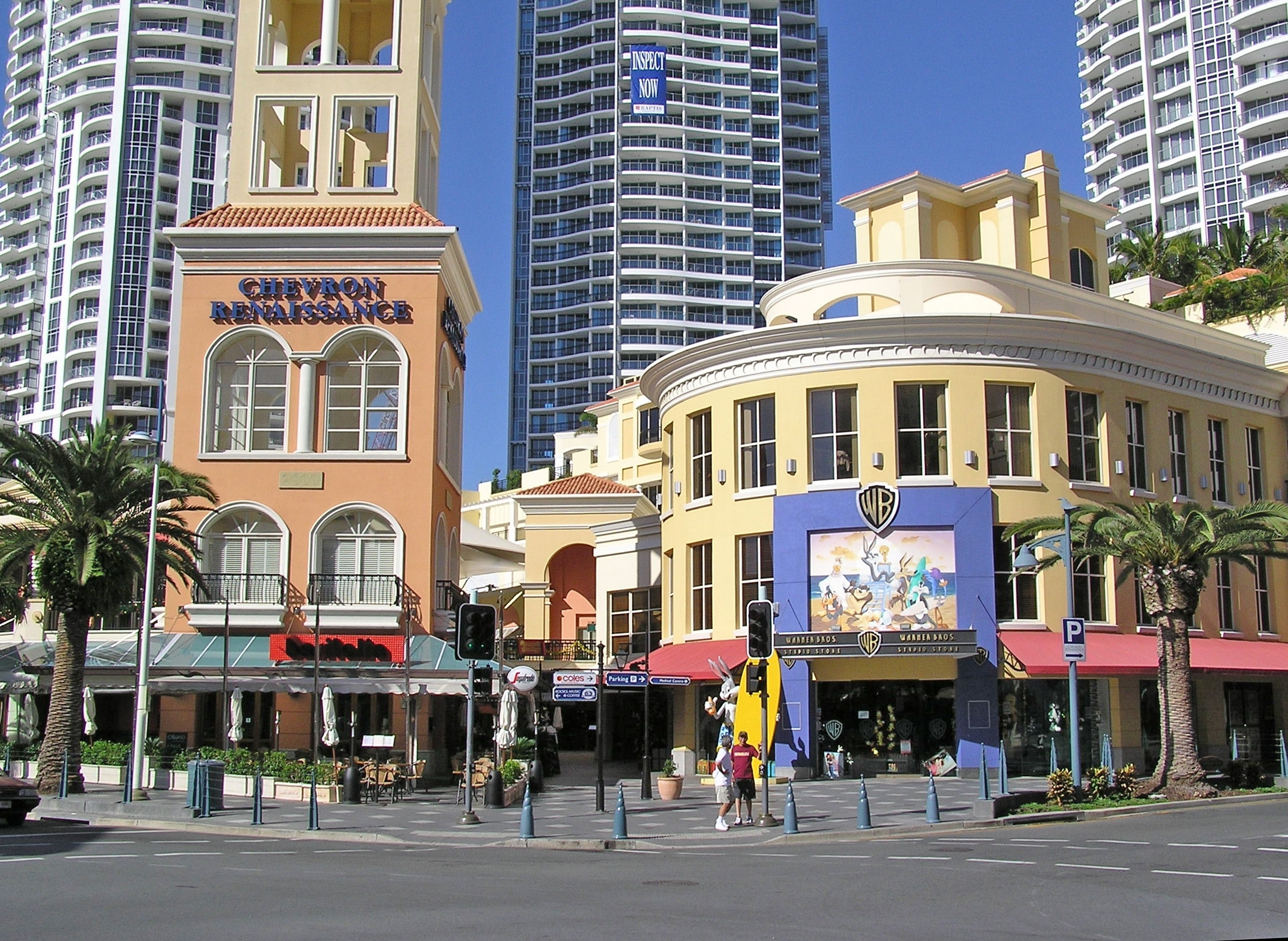
- An exterior of the last existing Warner Bros. Studio Store at Chevron Renaissance in Surfers Paradise, Queensland.
- Type: Subsidiary
- Founded: September 20, 1991; 35 years ago Los Angeles, California
- Defunct: December 31, 2001; 24 years ago
- Fate: Liquidation
- Headquarters: Burbank, California, United States
- Number of locations: Warner Bros. Studios Burbank
- Area served: North America, Europe, Australia, China, Japan, Indonesia
- Products: apparel, toys and merch
- Parent: Warner Bros. Consumer Products (Skydance Corporation)
- Website: Official website

The Warner Bros. Studio Store was a chain of retail stores selling Looney Tunes, DC Comics, and other merchandise based on Warner Bros. films, similar in style to the Disney Store. They first opened in 1991. In 1996, Warner Bros. owner Time Warner merged with Turner Broadcasting, which owned Hanna-Barbera, Cartoon Network, and the pre-1986 MGM library, and merchandise based on Hanna-Barbera and other Turner properties were added to the product lines. In 2001, all Warner Bros. Studio Stores went out of business, although some international locations, such as a handful of independently owned locations in Australia, continued to operate until 2008. In 2006, Warner Bros. Consumer Products partnered with PMW Retail and opened a line of Studio Stores in China. Hutchison Harbour Ring's subsidiary the PMW Retail Group Ltd., owned and operated the Chinese store locations from 2006 to 2014.

== History ==
The first Warner Bros. Studio Store was opened on Friday, September 20, 1991, at the Beverly Center in Los Angeles, California by Time Warner. The chain had 130 locations at its peak. In October 1993, a location opened at the corner of 57th St. and 5th Ave. in New York City, the first ever Studio Store in the city. Some of the store's attractions included a glass elevator carried by Superman and the 4D experience Marvin the Martian in the Third Dimension, the first ever computer-animated 3D movie produced in the world. In 1996, the chain signed a long-term lease for a three-story building at 1 Times Square and six of its billboards and opened a store on all three floors in 1997.

== Closure ==
In January 2001, the AOL-Time Warner merger was completed, at which time the chain was placed up for sale with plans to close if not sold. In February 2001, the flagship location on New York's Fifth Avenue was closed, and on September 11, 2001, the store at the World Trade Center mall was destroyed when the World Trade Center towers collapsed. High-profile stores in Los Angeles and Palo Alto were also closed. In July, AOL Time Warner announced that the chain, then consisting of 85 stores, would be shut down by October as Warner Bros. Studio Store moved out of the owned and operated retail business. Its three-story, 40,000-square-foot Times Square location started liquidation in July and closed in October. Warner Bros. then placed the building up for rent without the billboards. The last stores closed by December 31, 2001.

== International locations ==
From 1997 to 2008 several stores operated in Australia with the flagship location being in Crown Casino Melbourne. These stores, however, were owned by now defunct Paradise Retail Holdings and were run completely independently from stores of the same name internationally.

In January 2004, Warner Bros. announced that they were opening the first Chinese Studio Store location, after agreeing on a licensing deal with Hutchison Harbour Ring. On March 25, 2006, a grand opening celebration was held for the grand opening of the first Studio Store location in China. In October 2006, the second Chinese Warner Bros. Studio Store location opened in Macau.

In 2016, Warner Bros., with the Thinkwell Group opened a new entertainment center in Macau, which featured a new Warner Bros. Studio Store location.

== Locations ==
Warner Bros. Studio Store is used as the name of various theme park stores around the world, including at the Warner Bros. World theme park and at the Warner Bros. Studios in Burbank.
