= Oceanwide Center =

- Interactive map of the Oceanwide Center area

General information
- Status: Under construction
- Type: Commercial offices Residential condominiums Hotel
- Location: 50 First Street; San Francisco, California
- Coordinates: 37.7903°N 122.3985°W
- Groundbreaking: 2016
- Construction started: 2017
- Estimated completion: unknown
- Owner: Oceanwide Holdings

Height
- Architectural: Tower I: 910 ft (280 m); Tower II: 625 ft (191 m)
- Roof: Tower I: 850 ft (260 m); Tower II: 605 ft (184 m)

Technical details
- Floor count: Tower I: 61; Tower II: 54
- Floor area: Tower I: 1,432,872 sq ft (133,118.2 m^{2}); Tower II: 631,638 sq ft (58,681.1 m^{2})

Design and construction
- Architects: Foster + Partners; Heller Manus Architects
- Developer: Oceanwide Center LLC
- Structural engineer: Magnusson Klemencic Associates

Other information
- Number of units: Tower I: 111; Tower II: 169 hotel, 154 residential

Oceanwide Center was a planned mixed-use skyscraper complex in the South of Market neighborhood of San Francisco, California, consisting of two towers. After major excavation and foundation work, construction was halted in 2020 because of developer Oceanwide's financial trouble. The property was taken back by creditors in 2021 and a lawsuit against the developer by contractors claiming unpaid work was settled in November 2023. The site became notorious as a huge hole in the ground and symbol of the COVID-era collapse of downtown San Francisco's commercial real estate market, described by a city planner as a “gaping wound in the soul of the Financial District,” but serious interest from local developers in acquiring the site and starting a new project, potentially on the abandoned foundation, was reported by late 2025.

== Original Design ==
The taller tower, located at 50 First Street, was to rise 910 feet (280 m) and contain 34 stories (1,010,000 square feet (94,000 m^{2})) of office space below 19 floors with approximately 111 residential units. The base of the tower was planned to include a six-story tall, outdoor "urban room" of public open space. The tower design featured diagonal, exterior bracing and taper towards the top, reminiscent of the John Hancock Center in Chicago. If completed as proposed, the 905-foot (276 m) tower would have become San Francisco's second-tallest building after Salesforce Tower, surpassing the long time record-holder, the Transamerica Pyramid.

The shorter tower, at 512 Mission Street, was planned to climb 605 feet (184 m) and contain the 169-room Waldorf Astoria San Francisco hotel on the first 21 floors and approximately 154 residential units on the upper 33 floors.

== History ==
The parcels around 50 First Street were upzoned as part of the Transit Center District Plan approved in 2012 in conjunction with the new Salesforce Transit Center. The parcels were originally assembled by developer David Choo and a plan was floated in 2007 for towers as tall as 1,200 feet (370 m) designed by Renzo Piano. Choo was eventually forced to sell the property during the 2008 financial crisis.

In 2013, TMG Partners and Northwood Investors acquired the property out of bankruptcy court for US$122 million. TMG and Northwood hired Foster + Partners and Heller Manus Architects to re-design the project. In 2015, Beijing-based Oceanwide Holdings acquired the property for US$296 million. A groundbreaking ceremony for the buildings was held on December 8, 2016.

Construction on the shorter of the two towers was suspended in 2019 due to economic conditions. Subsequently, the construction on the second, taller tower was also halted in 2020 due to the COVID-19 pandemic.

In 2024 the sale of the stalled project was blocked by legal disputes. In January 2026, the property was reported to be purchased for US$60 million, which was roughly 80 percent less than the project's original developers paid for the land before plans were approved.

== See also ==
- List of tallest buildings in San Francisco
