= Graffiti in Los Angeles =

Art and vandalism in Los Angeles infrastructure

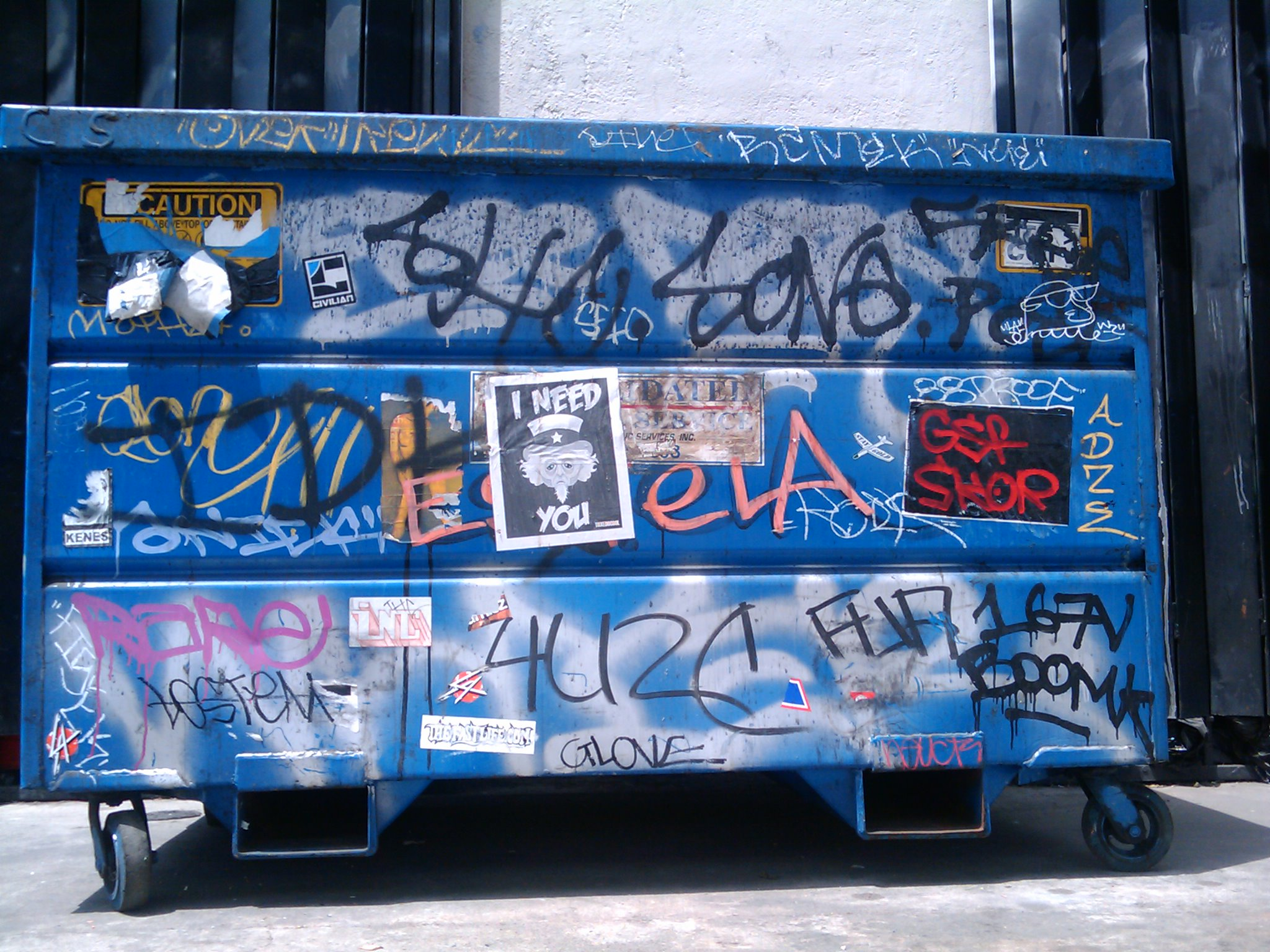
Dumpster with extensive graffiti, downtown Los Angeles, 2010

The American city of Los Angeles has seen graffiti for more than a century. According to the Los Angeles Times, "Graffiti has been a central part of Los Angeles for generations, an omnipresent part of the cityscape that has endured many attempts to stamp it out."

The 2nd Street Tunnel has been described as a "magnet for protest graffiti".

According to The Week, Oceanwide Plaza "has become a site for social media stunts and triggered debate over the value of artistry versus vandalism. The complex, which is currently known as LA's graffiti tower, is quickly becoming a nuisance for the city." The towers are depicted in a Tony Hawk video game.

== See also ==
- Beyond the Streets
- LAB ART Los Angeles
- Metro Transit Assassins
- Murals of Los Angeles
