= China Oceanwide Holdings Group =

Chinese investment company

China Oceanwide Holdings Group Co., Ltd.
- Trade name: China Oceanwide
- Company type: Private
- Traded as: SSE: 122458 (bond); SSE: 122470 (bond)
- Industry: Conglomerate
- Founder: Lu Zhiqiang
- Headquarters: Beijing, China
- Key people: Lu Zhiqiang (founder & chairman)
- Products: Real Estate
- Services: Financial services
- Revenue: ▲CN¥14.098 billion (2015)
- Operating income: ▲CN¥9.473 billion (2015)
- Net income: ▲CN¥8.200 billion (2015)
- Total assets: ▲CN¥199.437 billion (2015)
- Total equity: ▲CN¥27.526 billion (2015)
- Owner: Lu Zhiqiang (77.14%)
- Parent: Tohigh Holding (ultimate); Oceanwide Group (intermediate)
- Subsidiaries: Oceanwide Holdings (69.01%); Oceanwide Int'l Inv. (100%); Oceanwide Industries (100%)
- Website: www.chinaoceanwide.com
- Footnotes / references in a consolidated basis

China Oceanwide Holdings Group Co., Ltd. (Chinese: 中国泛海控股集团) known also as China Oceanwide is a Chinese privately owned investment company. It is the parent company of publicly traded company Oceanwide Holdings as well as the largest shareholder of another public company Minsheng Holding.

Founder Lu Zhiqiang, via Tohigh Holding Co., Ltd. (通海控股), owned 100% stake of Oceanwide Group Co., Ltd. (泛海集团), in turn Oceanwide Group owned 98% stake of China Oceanwide Holdings Group. The 2% stake was owned by Tohigh Holding. In turn, China Oceanwide Holdings Group owned Oceanwide Holdings and Oceanwide Holdings owned Hong Kong publicly traded company China Oceanwide Holdings Limited.

== History ==
China Oceanwide Holdings Group was the parent company of publicly traded companies Oceanwide Holdings (SZSE: 00046) and China Oceanwide Holdings Limited (SEHK: 715, themselves were parent and subsidiary). China Oceanwide Holdings Group had injected many assets to Oceanwide Holdings since 2005, but still half of the total assets were not listed (as of 2015 data). Moreover, the hotel assets of Oceanwide Group/Tohigh Holding (the parent companies), were owned by China Oceanwide Holdings Group's sister company.

In 2013 China Oceanwide Holdings Group acquired the controlling stake of China Minsheng Trust, and sold to Oceanwide Holdings in 2016. In 2015, China Oceanwide International Investment, an unlisted subsidiary of China Oceanwide Holdings Group, sold an Indonesian power plant project to China Oceanwide Holdings Limited. However, China Oceanwide International Investment retained 100% stake of PT. China Oceanwide Indonesia.

In October 2016 it was announced that the company was acquiring US long-term care insurance company Genworth Financial (via Asia Pacific Global Capital) for $2.7 billion. However as of April 2018 the acquisition of Genworth had not yet gone through pending approval by CFIUS in the United States. The deal was further delayed in July 2019 as Genworth tried to find a buyer for its Canadian subsidiary Genworth MI Canada Inc. On April 6, 2021, the proposed merger was terminated by Genworth Financial due to Oceanwide Holdings' inability to close on the acquisition within a reasonable time frame.

In March 2017, the group acquired International Data Group, publisher of PC World and Computerworld, along with its research subsidiary, IDC.

In February 2019, The London-Based accounting giant PriceWaterhouseCoopers has resigned as auditor following profit warning.

On 25 September 2023, China Oceanwide Holdings was declared bankrupt by a Bermuda court, with liquidation proceedings to be undertaken.

== Subsidiaries ==
- China Oceanwide International Investment (100%)
  - PT. China Oceanwide Indonesia (100%)
- Oceanwide Energy Holdings (泛海能源控股, 100%)
- Oceanwide Energy Investment Baotou (泛海能源投资包头, 100%)
- Oceanwide Industries (泛海实业, 100%)
- Asia Pacific Global Capital
- Oceanwide Holdings (SZSE: 000046 69.01%)
  - subsidiaries of Oceanwide Holdings (SZSE: 000046 69.01%)- Oceanwide Holdings International Financial Development Co., Ltd 100%
- Oceanwide Holdings International Financial Development Co.
  - subsidiaries of Oceanwide Holdings International Financial Development Co.- China Tonghai Financial 中國通海金融SEHK: 952 100%

== Equity investments ==
- China Minsheng Bank (5% via non-wholly-owned subsidiaries)
- CuDeco (21.01% via non-wholly-owned subsidiaries)
- Legend Holdings (16.97%)
- Minsheng Holding (22.56%)
