= South Street (Manhattan) =

Street in Manhattan, New York

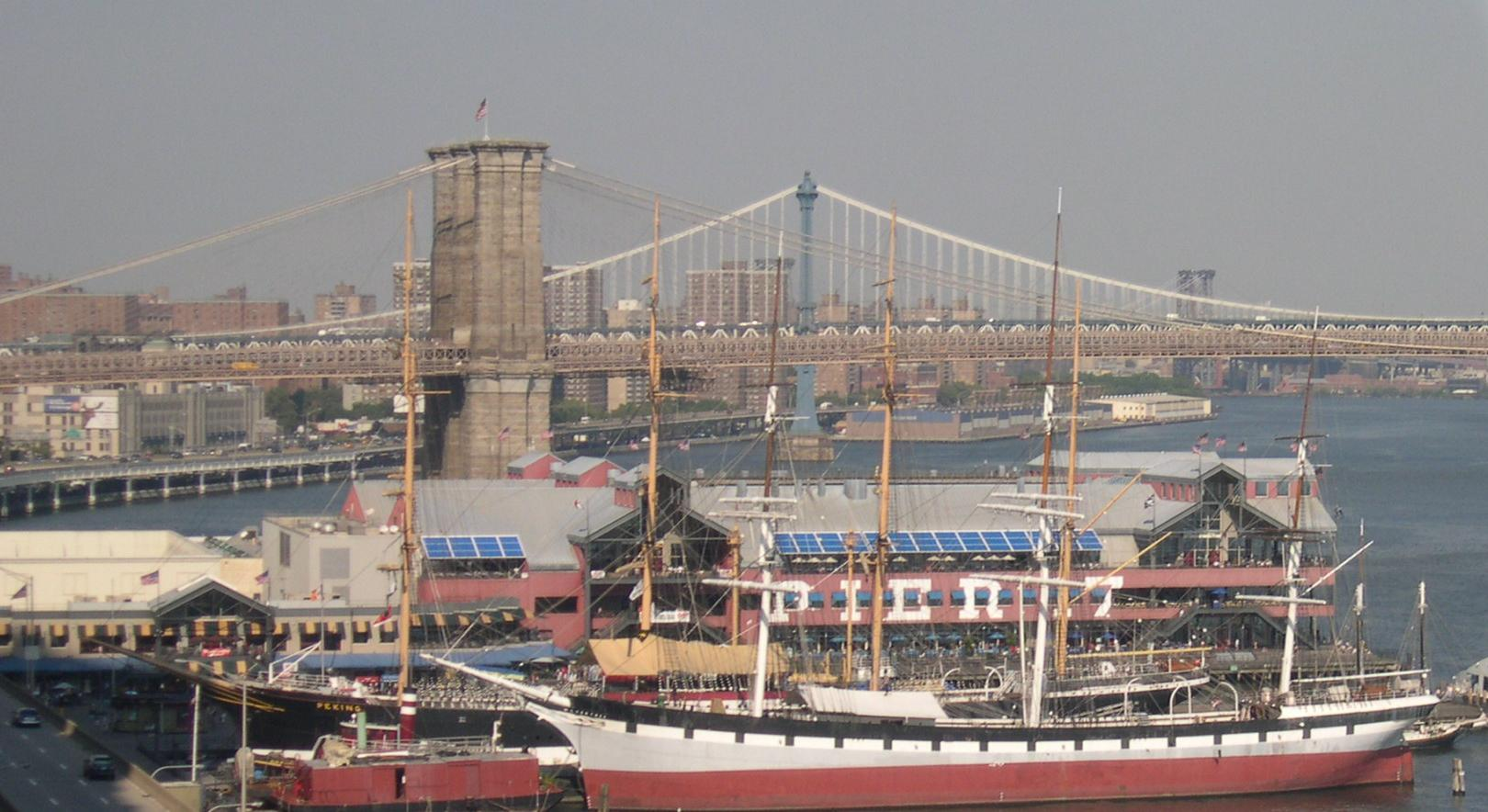
South Street Seaport pictured in 2005

South Street is a street in Lower Manhattan, New York City, located immediately adjacent to the East River. It runs from Whitehall Street near the southern tip of Manhattan to Jackson Street near the Williamsburg Bridge. An elevated portion of FDR Drive, known as the South Street Viaduct, runs along the entire length of the street.

The street is noted for the South Street Seaport, south of the Brooklyn Bridge, and is the former site of the Fulton Fish Market, which was located just to the north of the seaport. Knickerbocker Village, a municipal housing project, fronts on South Street between the Brooklyn Bridge and Manhattan Bridge in the Two Bridges neighborhood. West of the seaport, South Street is the location of a number of buildings, including 55 Water Street and the New York City Police Museum.

== History ==
The East River waterfront of lower Manhattan, which includes South Street (so named because it is on the south side of the island), played an important part in the early history of New York City and became, over a period of two hundred years, one of the most prosperous commercial districts in the city. This development of the South Street Seaport area from a small cluster of wharves in the 18th century to an important part of the leading port of the nation in the mld-19th century reflects the rise of New York City as an international center of commerce.

As early as 1625 when the Dutch West India Company established a trading post at the foot of Manhattan Island, the area south of today's seaport served as a landing site for incoming boats. The Dutch constructed a small floating dock which extended into the East River from what is now Broad Street. As lower Manhattan, then New Amsterdam, became more populous, a few streets were cut through the surrounding countryside. One of the first was Queen Street (now Pearl Street), laid out in 1633, which rapidly became the core of the mercantile community of 17th century Manhattan. Queen Street ran along the waterfront until the latter half of the 18th century when landfill extended the eastern boundary of Manhattan out to Water and later to Front Street.

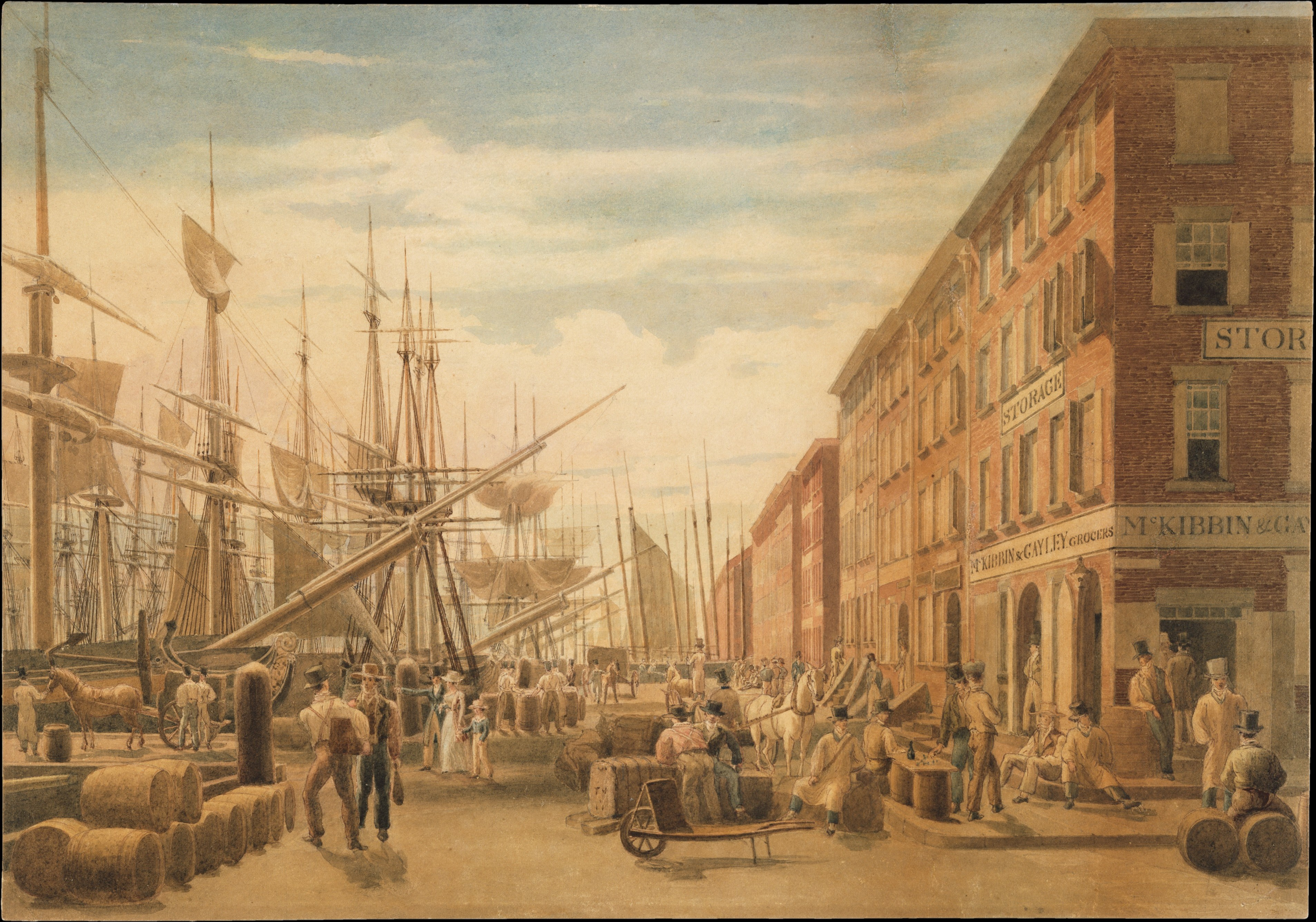
William James Bennett's watercolor painting of South Street, viewed from Maiden Lane, c. 1827

South Street was built on landfill in the latter part of the 17th century; the city began to grade and pave it in 1798, creating a 75-foot border between houses and merchants' shops, and the wharves, slips and piers that had sprung up along the street; the width was necessary because the ships docked right against the shoreline, with their bowsprits sticking out into the street, giving it its nickname, the "streety o' ships". In the early 19th century, South Street was created on additional landfill. South Street became the center of the city's shipping industry and water-based commerce for two hundred years; although by 1810 it was getting competition from West Street on the other side of the island. In 1835, the Great Fire of New York destroyed 76 of the buildings on the street, but that hardly kept back the expansion of commerce along the shoreline. On one day in 1836, there were 921 vessels on the East River waiting to load or unload onto South Street, while an additional 320 waited on the Hudson. At that time, New York City had 62% of the import business in the entire country.

The amount of trade kept increasing, and by 1857 Gleason's Pictorial Magazine described both South and West Streets as blocks and blocks of "sail-lofts, shipping offices, warehouses of every description, cheap eating-houses, markets, and those indescribable stores, where old cables, junk, anchors, and all sorts of cast-off worldly things, that none but a seaman has a name for, find a refuge."

By the 1930s, the South Street area was depressed and the hurly-burly of its heyday was gone:

On mild sunny days the drifters sit along the docks with their "junk bags", share cigarette butts, and stare endlessly into the water. In winter they cluster in little groups about small bonfires; many sleep at night in doorways with newspapers for covering. Other join the homeless men who sleep in the Municipal Lodging House, Annex No. 2, in the old ferry shed at the foot of Whitehall Street, which can accommodate about 1,200 nightly.

Sometime in the early 1980s, South Street was refurbished from its abandoned status into a tourist attraction to create an atmosphere similar to places like Baltimore's Inner Harbor and Boston's Quincy Market.

== Transportation ==
A small portion south of Broad Street is served by the M15 bus. The M20 and M55 buses, which terminate at South Ferry, also use this section for deadheads. The South Ferry station complex is located nearby, served by the 1, R, and W trains.

== Nearby points of interest ==
- Alfred E. Smith Houses
- Battery Maritime Building
- Imagination Playground at Burling Slip
- Knickerbocker Village
- New York City Police Museum
- Pier 11/Wall Street
- South Street Seaport
- Whitehall Street Ferry Terminal
- 55 Water Street
- Never built: 80 South Street
- Former: Fulton Fish Market
