= China Minsheng Trust =

Chinese trust and investment management company

- Formerly: China Tourism International Trust Investment
- Company type: Subsidiary
- Industry: Financial services
- Founded: 1994; 16 April 2013
- Headquarters: Beijing, China
- Services: trust; investment management
- Revenue: ▲CN¥1.082 billion (2015)
- Operating income: ▲CN¥514.5 million (2015)
- Net income: ▲CN¥391.3 million (2015)
- Total assets: ▲CN¥4.710 billion (2015)
- Total equity: ▲CN¥3.594 billion (2015)
- Owner: Oceanwide Holdings (93.4214%); Beijing Tourism Group (6.4286%); CYTS Group (0.0857%); CRTS (0.0429%); CCT Group (0.0214%)
- Number of employees: ▲228 (2015)
- Parent: Oceanwide Holdings
- Website: www.msxt.com
- Footnotes / references source

China Minsheng Trust Co., Ltd.
- Simplified Chinese: 中国民生信托有限公司
- Traditional Chinese: 中國民生信託有限公司
Transcriptions

China Minsheng Trust Co., Ltd. is a Chinese trust and investment management company. The company formerly known as China Tourism International Trust Investment Co., Ltd. founded in 1994.

== History ==
China Tourism International Trust Investment Co., Ltd. (Chinese: 中国旅游国际信托投资有限公司) was founded in 1994. In 1999, the stake (30.85%) held by China National Tourism Administration was transferred to Beijing Tourism Group.

In 2003, most of the assets and branches were acquired by Century Securities. However, China Tourism Trust was allowed to keep the license. In 2004, a scandal was exposed, which the Tianjin branch of China Tourism Trust stole the fund entrusted by Tianjin House Fund Management Center.

On 16 April 2013, the company was re-established as China Minsheng Trust Co., Ltd. China Oceanwide Holdings Group was the largest shareholder for 69.3%, Beijing Tourism Group for 30%, CYTS Group (the parent company of China CYTS Tours Holding) for 0.4%, China Railway Travel Service for 0.2% stake and China Comfort Travel Group for 0.1% stake.

In 2014, China Oceanwide Holdings Group and its subsidiary, listed company Oceanwide Holdings (SZSE: 000046) subscribed the capital increase of CN¥2 billion (CN¥1 billion in share capital and CN¥1 billion in share premium).

In 2016, Oceanwide Holdings subscribed CN¥4 billion nominal value of stock of the company (plus share premium CN¥1.6872 billion), as well as acquired the stake held by the parent company China Oceanwide Holdings Group.

In September the company acquired the license to manage foreign assets. In December the trust acquired the license to enter futures market.

== See also ==
- Minsheng Securities sister company
