= Lu Zhiqiang =

Chinese businessman (born 1952)

- 卢志强
- Born: 1952 (age 73–74)
- Education: Fudan University
- Occupation: Businessman
- Title: Former chairman and CEO, Oceanwide Holdings
- Spouse: Married

Lu Zhiqiang (Chinese: 卢志强; born 1952) is a Chinese businessman. He was the chairman of Oceanwide Holdings, a Chinese property company, until May 2020.

At a 21 May 2020 Oceanwide Holdings board meeting, Lu stood down as chairman, and his position was assumed by Song Hongmo. On 29 May 2020, Lu stood down as CEO, and that position was also assumed by Song Hongmo.

Lu is a member of the Chinese Communist Party, but does not hold any official government positions. He is a member of the standing committee of the Chinese People's Political Consulative Conference (CPPCC).

== Early life ==
Lu Zhiqiang was born in 1952. He has an MA degree from Fudan University.

== Career ==
According to Forbes, Lu Zhiqiang has a net worth of $5.2 billion, as of August 2015.

== Personal life ==
He is married, and lives in Beijing.
