= Oceanwide Plaza =

Mixed-use complex in Los Angeles, California

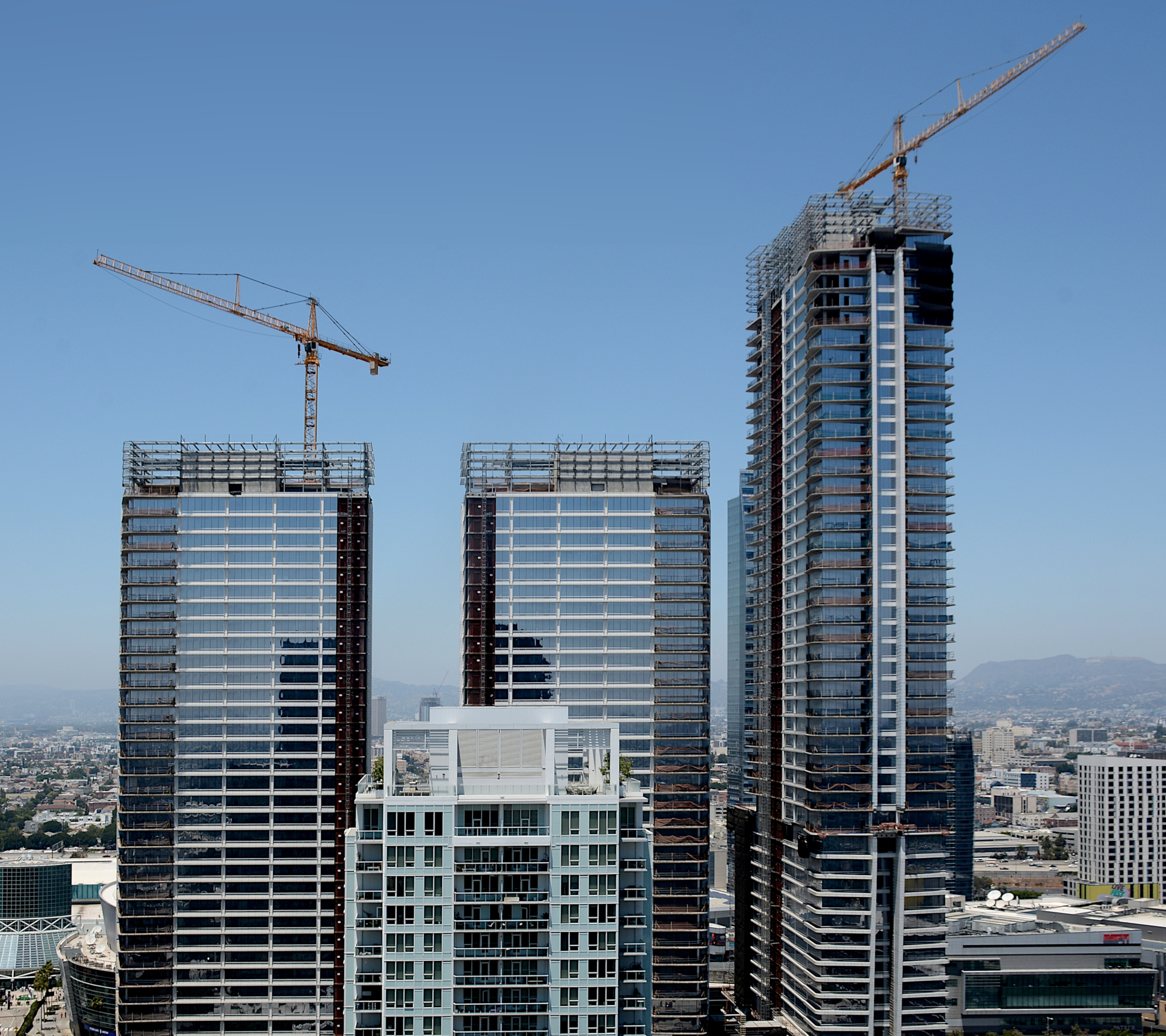
- Alternative names: Graffiti Towers

General information
- Status: on hold (since 2019; 7 years ago)
- Type: Retail and residential
- Location: 1101 Flower Street; Los Angeles, California
- Coordinates: 34°02′33″N 118°15′55″W
- Construction started: 2015; 11 years ago
- Cost: $1 billion
- Owner: Oceanwide Holdings
- Operator: Oceanwide Holdings

Height
- Height: Tower 1: 677 feet (206.4 meters), Towers 2 & 3: 530 feet (161.5 meters)
- Architectural: 677 ft (206.4 m), 530 ft (161.5 m)
- Roof: 677 ft (206.4 m), 530 ft (161.5 m)

Technical details
- Floor count: Tower 1: 49 (4 below ground), Towers 2 & 3: 40
- Floor area: 2 million sq ft
- Lifts/elevators: 49

Design and construction
- Architect: RTKL
- Developer: Oceanwide Holdings
- Structural engineer: Englekirk Structural Engineers
- Main contractor: Lendlease

Other information
- Public transit: Pico

Website
- http://www.fhkg.com/index.php/Ch/En/Industrial/infor_gk/id/51

Oceanwide Plaza is an unfinished residential and retail complex composed of three towers in Downtown Los Angeles, California, across the street from Crypto.com Arena and the Los Angeles Convention Center. The complex, designed by CallisonRTKL, is owned by the Beijing-based developer Oceanwide Holdings.

Construction began in 2015 and was scheduled to be completed by early 2019. Construction stopped when Oceanwide Holdings ran out of funds in 2019. Development has been beset by financing problems related to ongoing geopolitical tensions between the US and China. In late January-early February 2024, the site regained attention when at least 27 floors of multiple towers at the complex were tagged with graffiti, becoming known as the Graffiti Towers.

== Design ==
Oceanwide Plaza was designed by CallisonRTKL. Tower one was designed to feature a 184-room five-star Park Hyatt hotel and 164 Park Hyatt serviced condo residences, a live-in hotel option. It was designed to reach a total height of 675 ft (206 m), 49 floors. Towers two and three were designed to have 504 residential condominiums. They were designed to reach a total of 530 ft (160 m), 40 floors in height. A retail mall was designed for the first three floors above ground with 153,000 ft^{2} (14,200 m^{2}) of retail space. The 9th floor was designed to feature a two-acre private park. The 504 residences were designed to provide concierge services, indoor amenities, and a private deck along with an outdoor area for recreation and gatherings.

== History ==
=== Construction ===
The site was a vacant parking lot used by Crypto.com Arena patrons in the South Park neighborhood of Downtown Los Angeles. The site is immediately northwest of Los Angeles Metro Rail's Pico station.

This development is part of a group of projects being developed on Figueroa Street in the 2010s, which allowed the addition of giant video advert screens facing Crypto.com Arena. Nearby projects include the Circa Towers and the Luxe Development. Oceanwide renderings also featured large ribbon-style video LED screens.

=== On Hold ===
The three apartment towers began construction in April 2018. By January 2019, interior construction on the project was put on hold. The developer cited restructuring of capital and indicated work on the plaza would resume shortly. Contractor Lendlease suspended work until late March 2019, when it was announced that construction had resumed after nine active liens had been filed by subcontractors totaling US$98.6 million. Media reported that the towers were stuck in limbo over unpaid work and pending lawsuits. The towers were an example of Chinese reductions in capital and investing in US real estate due to the Chinese government's crackdown on capital flight due to its real estate financial crisis exacerbated by a US trade war. Completion of work was reported to be uncertain and all work was put on hold in late 2019.

In 2020, former Los Angeles City Councilmember, Jose Huizar, who had represented the Downtown area and chaired the council's Planning Committee, was arrested on charges that he had accepted bribes from several developers, including China-Oceanwide, in exchange for allowing their projects to continue. By November 2022, the construction cranes were removed from the towers due to ongoing financial and legal issues, signaling further delays for the project.

=== Foreclosure ===
After China-Oceanwide failed to pay its debts, the project was foreclosed on by June 2023 and listed for sale. No asking price information was released. China-Oceanwide owed $157 million to a group of EB-5 lenders and planned to repay them from the proceeds of the sale. Lendlease filed a claim in court that it should be first in line for payment in the foreclosure sale. Lendlease also filed with the California Court of Appeals to invalidate the EB-5 loans altogether, claiming fraud and misrepresentation. In filings with the Hong Kong Stock Exchange, China-Oceanwide said that more than $1.2 billion was needed to finish the project and that they had already spent $1.1 billion. They removed the building from the sale. The project entered bankruptcy court.

=== Vandalism ===
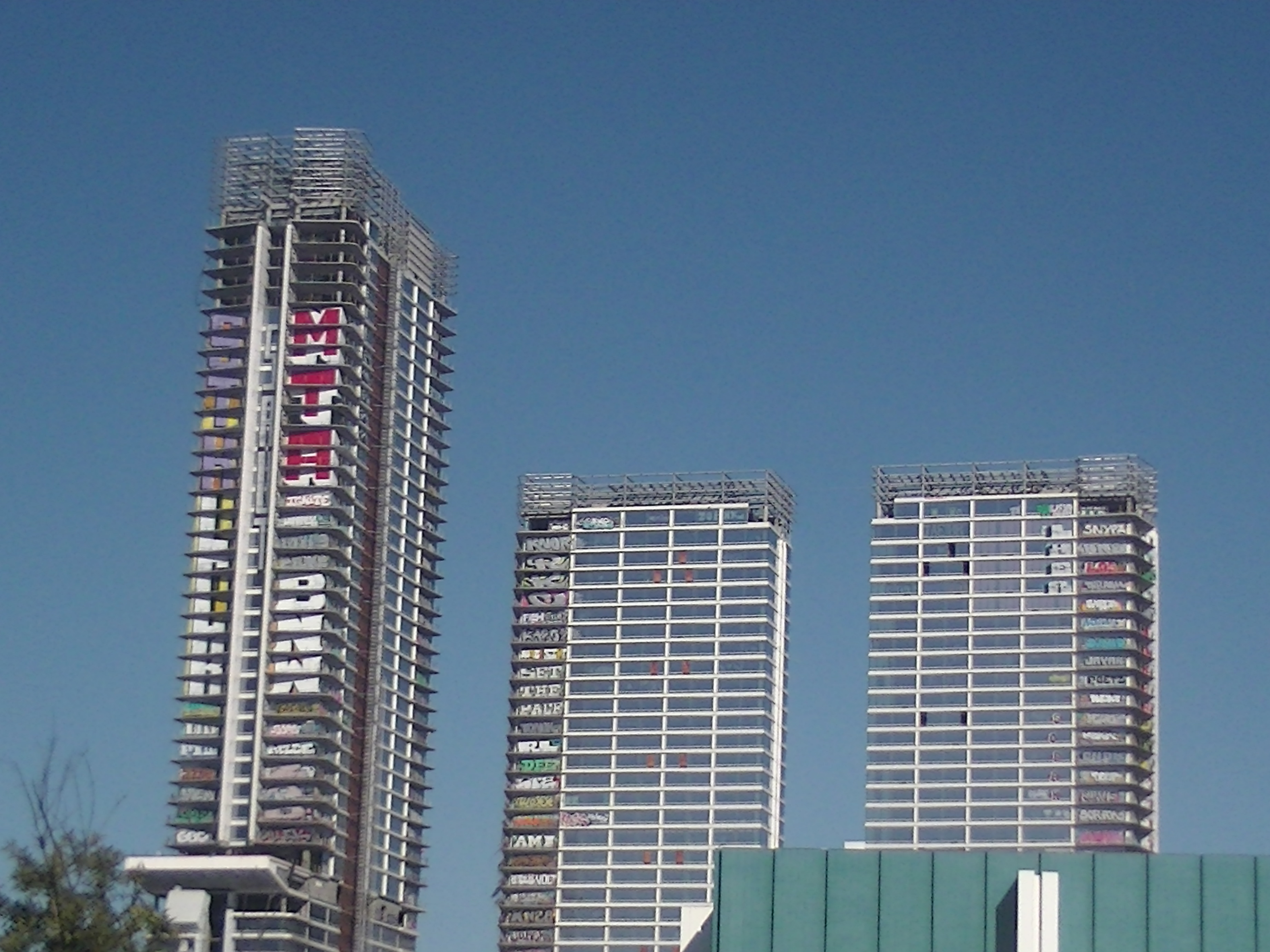
Oceanwide Plaza in 2024

In late December 2023, taggers broke into the tallest building of Oceanwide's three towers and spray painted their names across its floor to ceiling windows. Following the event, more members of Los Angeles’ graffiti community began to participate throughout late January and early February 2024 in tagging the skyscrapers. Around the same time the tagging escalated, base jumpers also broke into Tower 1 and filmed themselves jumping off of it.

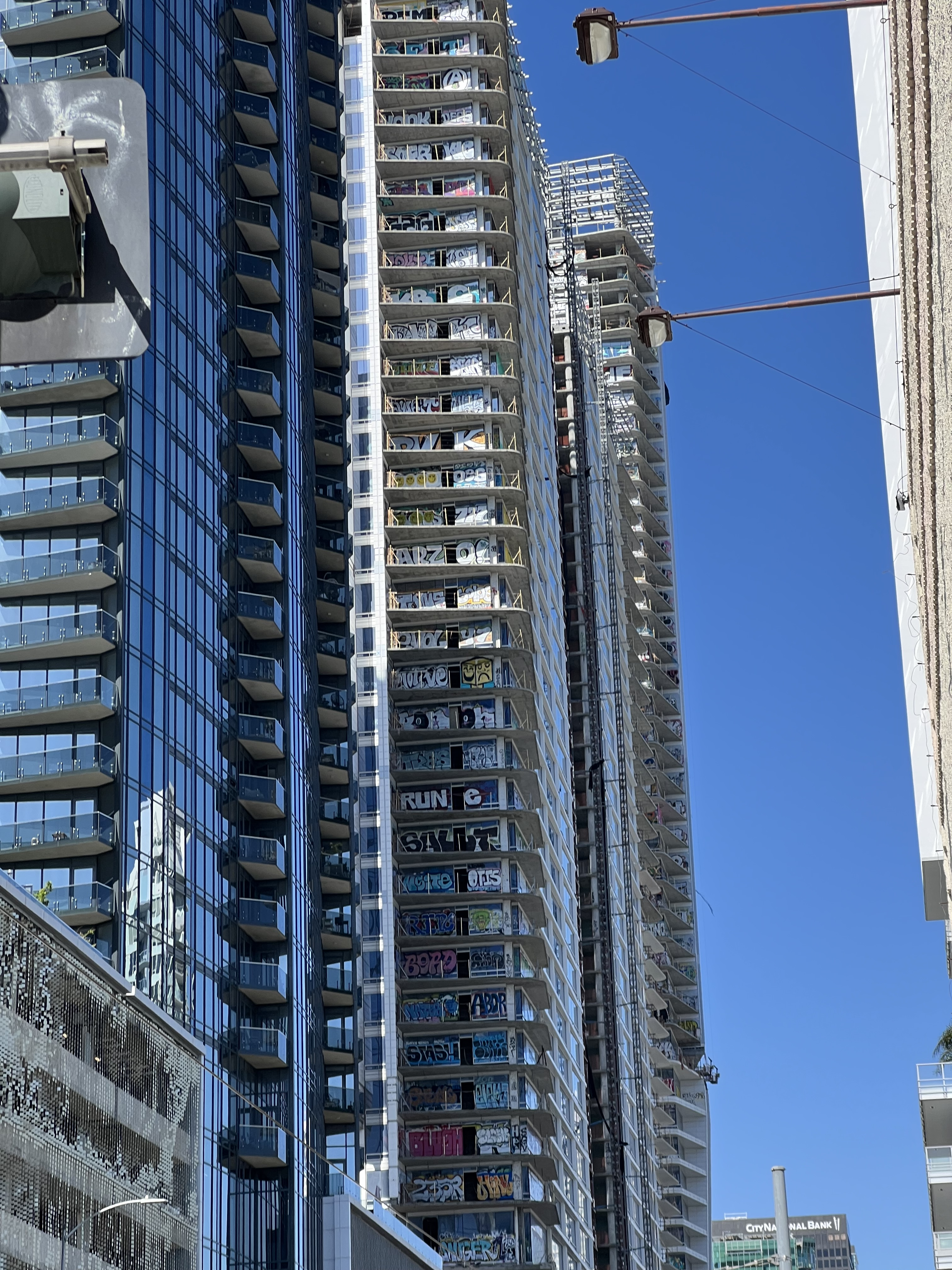
Oceanwide Plaza

The events sparked political urgency in Los Angeles, leading the Los Angeles Police Department to allocate resources to safeguard property while ensuring public safety. A taller fence was added to the site to keep trespassers out. Approximately 30 trespassers were arrested, facing a total of 23 criminal charges.

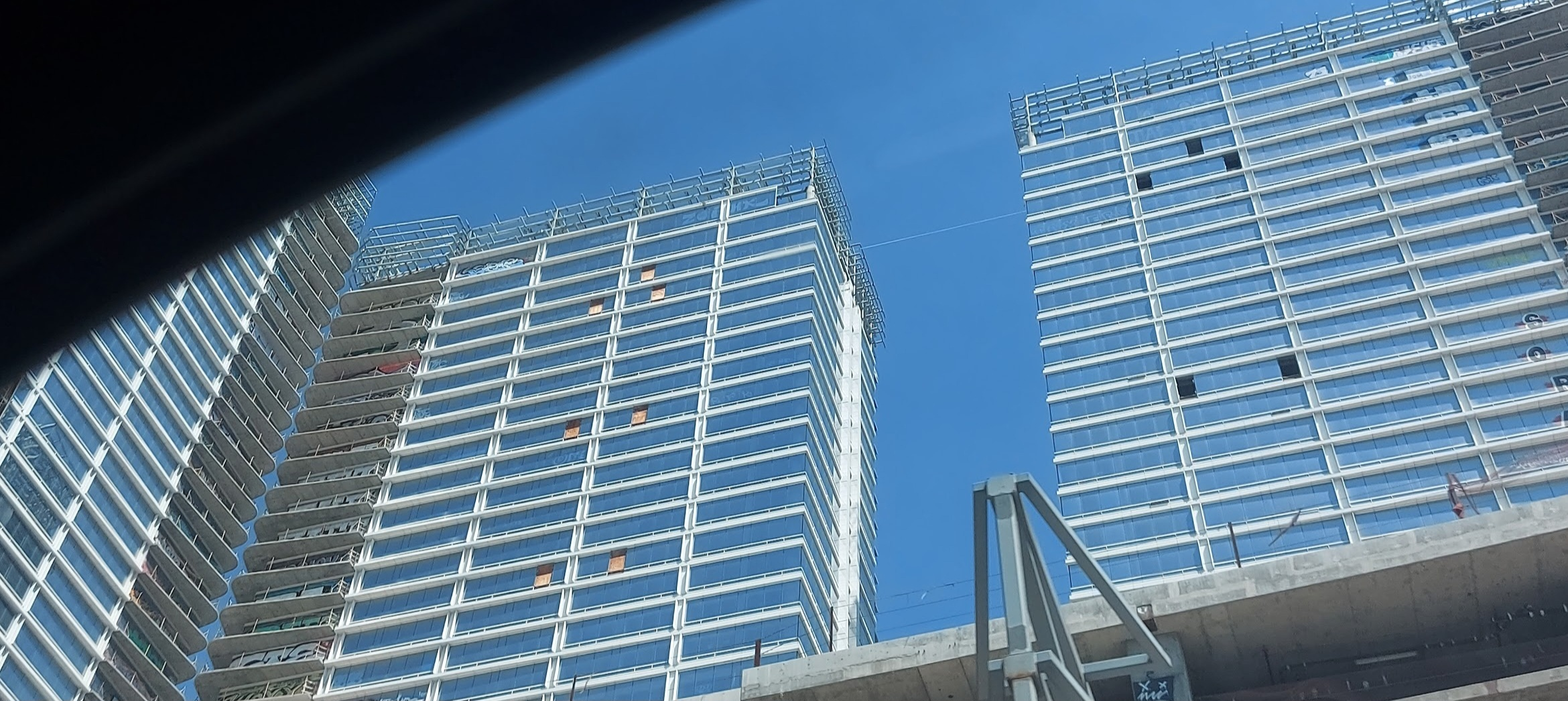
Tightrope visible between the top of Towers 2 & 3

In May 2024, China-Oceanwide re-listed the towers for sale. They reportedly need $400 million to pay off the lenders and re-coup their money. Around that same time, YouTuber Reckless Ben managed to sneak past the site's security and filmed himself tightrope walking across the top of Towers 2 and 3. LAPD launched a criminal investigation afterwards and the video was removed from his YouTube channel. The tightrope remained between the two towers until September 2024.

The Los Angeles City Council announced a cleanup campaign for the graffiti, and on February 9, 2024, the Los Angeles City Council voted to bill Oceanwide approximately $4 million for expenses including graffiti removal and barrier reinforcement. The city later reversed course, stating in March 2025 that they did not wish to incur the cost of graffiti removal. The graffiti removal started on July 23, 2026 and ended on November 11, 2026, after its sale.

=== Foreclosure sale ===
In August 2025, Mark Tarczynski, the building's broker, noted that two real estate companies, one American and one overseas, were bidding for the unfinished towers. The asking price was $450 million to fully acquire the site and roughly $1 billion expected in costs to complete it. In January 2026, the China-Oceanwide struck a deal with its creditors to exit bankruptcy and sell itself to investors for $1.2 billion.

On February 26, 2026, it was reported a local real estate developer would buy Oceanwide Plaza for $470 million. Lendlease and KPC Development reported plans to complete the stalled $1.2-billion project by removing graffiti, then building housing, a hotel, retail space and restaurants as planned. KPC emerged as the frontrunner in the Chapter 11 auction process and signed a Purchase and sale agreement. IRS, Los Angeles County, and the City of Los Angeles raised concerns about the unpaid property taxes and municipal fees that have accumulated since 2019, delaying the sale approval by the bankruptcy court. Creditors were also demanding when these debts would be settled. The court had skepticism if KPC and Lendlease had the funds to complete the project. Eventually, the judge ruled the sale to Lendlease/KPC could proceed on July 20, 2026. After six months of negotiations, the plan was presented to the judge in a confirmation hearing. The offer consisted of a $500 million credit bid consisting of secured claims from EB-5 visa investors and $70 million in cash. The bankruptcy court judge confirmed the liquidation plan that gives KPC/Lendlease six months to make good on its purchase after the chapter 11 auction sale closure.

== See also ==
- Graffiti in Los Angeles
- Tour 13
