= Elion Group =

Chinese afforestation company

- Industry: Energy and environment
- Founded: 1988
- Founder: Wang Wenbiao

Elion Group founded in 1988, is a Chinese company in afforestation and reclaiming desert and drylands, and is headquartered in the Kubuqi Desert.

The company has a "Green Land Plan", a land management program in Kubuqi Desert, where local farmers and herdsmen in the desert are the stated beneficiaries. The program has restored 6,000 km2 of the desert and turned it into sustainable "green lands", and consequently generated around 5.1 billion dollars of Gross Ecosystem Production (GEP). It also runs the funding programme, “Greening the Silk Road Partnership Programme”, that was jointly initiated with the UNEP and UNCCD, and its stated goals are to plant 1.3 billion trees within a decade.

Committed to preventing land degradation and transforming deserts into cities, it has partnered with both the locals and the Chinese government to combat desertification. According to Time magazine in 2017, the company has greened one third of Kubuqi Desert after almost 3 decades. Based on Elion's experiment, Kubuqi International Desert Forum, the only desert forum worldwide, was established in 2007.

The achievement of Elion Resources Group has been recognized by UNEP and UNCCD and is now broadening its business to other environmentally related areas. In March 2015, Elion became the first Chinese company that joined the program of RE 100 initiated by the Climate Group.

== Entrepreneur ==
Wang Wenbiao (Chinese: 王文彪,; pinyin: Wáng Wénbiāo) born in Kubuqi, Inner Mongolia, is the founder and chairman of Elion Group. He is a CPC member and a senior Economist with a master's degree.

=== Current position and public titles ===
- Serving as Party Secretary and Chairman of Elion Resources Group
- In 2005, elected as 'the Vice President of Chinese Honored Enterprise Promotion Agency'.
- In 2007, becoming Vice Co-chairman of the All-China Federation of Industry and Commerce
- In 2013, becoming 'Executive Member of the 12th CPPCC'

=== Honored Awards in recent years ===
- 2013 - UN started awarding "Global Dryland Champion" to individuals who are committed to preventing desertification around the world and who have made outstanding progress in 2013. As the chairman of Elion Group, by leading his company to realize the forestation in desert areas in China, Wang Wenbiao was awarded the prize during the Eleventh UNCCD Conference of the Parties.
- 2012 - Mr. Wang Wenbiao was awarded ‘the UN Environmental Development Prize at the Rio 20+ Summit in Brazil’
- 2008 - Mr. Wang Wenbiao was awarded ‘China Charity Award’
- 2006 - Mr. Wang Wenbiao was ‘awarded the title of Top 10 Entrepreneurs Most Respected by People’

== Kubuqi Model ==
=== Kubuqi Model ===
Elion Group has been dedicated to improving the ecology of Kubuqi Desert in Inner Mongolia for more than 25 years. Based on their experience, they have explored a model called 'Kubuqi Model' in managing desertification and land degradation.

According to the company, Kubuqi Model involves 'influential factors' such as 'enterprise development driven by science and technology, large-scale desertification control driven by industry and people's livelihood improvement driven by ecological zone'.

So far, Elion has 'saved more than 6000 square kilometers from desertification'.

In addition to environmental protection, the life of locals in Kubuqi was also improved. As was reported by Xinhua News, Elion Group has helped the local herdsmen to settle in the village and become workers in the factory.

== Green Silk Road Program ==
In 2014, at the 6th World Park Congress, Elion Group and UNCCD declared a ‘partnership to combat land degradation and climate change’. This partnership was named 'Green Silk Road'.

According to it, the partnership will build '1.3 billion trees alongside the Silk Road' and will focus on ameliorating 'land degradation' and 'tackling climate change for the world's peace and security'. On March 9, 2015, the first private equity fund for Green Silk Road was launched in Beijing, which will be used in 'ecological solar panel construction, clean energy and ecological remediation in China and other countries'. The fund was contributed by several Chinese companies, including Elion Group.
