= Hutchison Harbour Ring =

- Hutchison Harbour Ring logo
- Company type: public
- Traded as: SEHK: 715
- Industry: Real Estate
- Founded: 2001
- Defunct: 2014
- Successor: China Oceanwide Holdings Limited
- Headquarters: Bermuda (registered office); Hong Kong (headquarters)
- Area served: mainland China
- Key people: Canning Fok (Chairman)
- Revenue: ▲HK$88.4 million (2013)
- Net income: ▼HK$174.7 million (2013)
- Total assets: ▼HK$6.553 billion (2013)
- Total equity: HK$6.101 billion (2013)
- Owner: Hutchison Whampoa (71.36%)
- Parent: Hutchison Whampoa
- Footnotes / references in a consolidated basis

Hutchison Harbour Ring Limited was a Bermuda incorporated company based in Hong Kong. The company was sold to Oceanwide Holdings in December 2014.

It was a holding company that manufactures and markets toys, premiums, telecommunication accessories and electronic products. Its products are mainly sold to the United States and Europe. However, it was transformed into a real estate company, which owned various floors of Harbour Ring Plaza and Harbour Ring Huangpu Centre, both in Shanghai, via two subsidiaries. State-owned enterprise Gold Bund Group was the minority shareholder of both subsidiaries, which offered to the public to buy in 2017.

== History ==
Hutchison Harbour Ring Limited, formerly Harbour Ring International Holding Limited, was founded by Dr. Luk Chung Lam (Chinese: 陸宗霖) family. It was listed on the Hong Kong Stock Exchange in 1991. In 2000, Hutchison Whampoa coped with ICG, a Nasdaq-traded electronic commerce company, to acquire Harbour Ring to build electronic commerce businesses in Asia during the Internet bubble period. In 2001, it was renamed to Hutchison Harbour Ring Limited.

In November 2014, Hutchison Whampoa sold a 71.4% majority stake in the company to the Chinese real estate developer Oceanwide Holdings for HK$3.82 billion ($493 million), which activate the mandatory public offer to buy the remain offer from the market. Eventually the company remained as a public company, with new name, new business, new assets as China Oceanwide Holdings Limited.
