= Shanghai-Hong Kong Stock Connect =

Investment channel

Shanghai-Hong Kong Stock Connect (simplified Chinese: 沪港通; traditional Chinese: 滬港通) is a cross-boundary investment channel that connects the Shanghai Stock Exchange (SSE) and the Stock Exchange of Hong Kong (SEHK). Under the program, investors in each market are able to trade shares on the other market using their local brokers and clearing houses. Chinese Premier Li Keqiang announced the programme on 10 April 2014. The scheme launched on 17 November 2014.

== History ==
Mutual market access was raised as early as January 2013 when Charles Li, the chief executive of SEHK, announced it as an objective in the bourse's three-year strategic plan. It was finally formally announced by Chinese Premier Li Keqiang at the Boao Forum in the Chinese province of Hainan on April 10, 2014. Premier Li said the move aims to promote two-way opening-up and healthy development of the capital market on the mainland and Hong Kong. "We will carry out a new round of opening-up at a high level," Li said, adding that an important part of this endeavor is to further open up the service sector, including the capital market.

Following the Premier's announcement, the Securities and Futures Commission (SFC) in Hong Kong and the China Securities Regulatory Commission (CSRC) in Beijing made a Joint Announcement regarding the in-principle approval for the pilot programme. It said it should take approximately six months to launch.

== Operational Issues ==
The stock connect program launched successfully in November 2014, but certain mechanisms, such as T+0 securities settlement, Delivery Versus Payment, and difficulties re-creating the common omnibus trading account structure were unfamiliar to international institutional investors.

UCITS funds out of Luxembourg and Ireland faced additional legal questions around the concept of beneficial ownership of A-shares purchased through the link. Eventually, an enhanced SPSA model provided by Hong Kong custodians alleviated much of the concerns, gradually removing barriers for such funds to receive approval to invest via the stock connect link.

== Details of the Scheme ==
Shanghai-Hong Kong Stock Connect is the first controllable and expandable channel for mutual market access between the Mainland and Hong Kong by a broad range of investors. Eligible investors in Mainland China can purchase eligible shares listed on the SEHK via their own local broker, while Hong Kong and international investors will be able to purchase eligible Shanghai-listed shares through their local broker.

Investor Eligibility

All Hong Kong and overseas investors will be allowed to trade eligible shares listed in Shanghai. However, only Mainland institutional investors and individual investors who have RMB500,000 in their investment and cash accounts are eligible to trade Hong Kong-listed shares.

Eligible Stocks

Only A shares listed in Shanghai will be included in the initial stage. Hong Kong and overseas investors will be able to trade certain stocks listed on the SSE including all constituent stocks from time to time of the SSE 180 Index and SSE 380 Index, and all the SSE-listed A shares that are not included as constituent stocks of the relevant indices but which have corresponding H shares listed in Hong Kong, except for those not traded in RMB and included in the “risk alert board”.

Mainland investors will be able to trade the constituent stocks of the Hang Seng Composite LargeCap Index and Hang Seng Composite MidCap Index, and all H shares that are not included as constituent stocks of the relevant indices but which have corresponding A shares listed in Shanghai (except for Hong Kong shares not traded in Hong Kong dollars and H shares which have shares listed and traded not in Shanghai).

Quotas

Northbound and southbound trading was subject to separate sets of aggregate and daily quotas at launch. The northbound aggregate quotas was set at RMB 300 billion, while the southbound aggregate was set at RMB250 billion. The quotas is calculated on a netting basis at the end of each trading day. The aggregate quotas has been abolished since August 16, 2016.

The daily quota limits the maximum net buy value of cross-boundary trades under the scheme. The current northbound daily quotas is set at RMB52 billion while the southbound daily quota is set at RMB42 billion as of March 31, 2020.

Trading Hours

Northbound trading will follow the hours set on the SSE, however the SSE will accept northbound orders five minutes before the Mainland market session opens in the morning and in the afternoon.

Southbound trading will follow the SEHK's hours.

Holidays

Trading will only be conducted with both markets are open on trading and settlement days.

Trading Currency

All trading in the scheme will be done in RMB.

=== Clearing and settlement ===
For northbound trades, ChinaClear will act as the host central counterparty (CCP) and Hong Kong Securities Clearing Company (HKSCC) will be a participant of ChinaClear. HKSCC will take up settlement obligations of its Clearing Participants in respect of northbound trades and settle the trades directly with ChinaClear in the Mainland.

The same will apply for southbound trades; HKSCC will be the host CCP and ChinaClear will be its Clearing Agency Participant. ChinaClear will take up settlement obligations of its clearing participants in respect of southbound trades and settle the trades with HKSCC in Hong Kong.

== See also ==
- Shenzhen-Hong Kong Stock Connect
