= Kubuqi Desert =

Desert in China

Coordinates: 40.688°N 108.070°E

The Kubuqi Desert (simplified Chinese: 库布齐沙漠; traditional Chinese: 庫布齊沙漠; pinyin: Kùbùqí Shāmò), also known via its Mongolian name as the Hobq Desert (Mongolian: ᠾᠣᠪᠬ
ᠭᠣᠪᠢ), is a desert within the Ordos Basin in northwestern China, under the administration of the Inner Mongolian Ordos City. Located between the Hetao plains and the Loess Plateau, it is part of the Ordos Desert along with the neighboring Mu Us Desert to its south, and is the seventh-largest desert in China with an area of 18,600 km^{2} (7,200 sq mi).

== Ecology ==
The area had gone through desertification due to centuries of overgrazing.

Starting in 1988, the Elion Resources Group and the Government of Beijing worked to reverse desertification and restore the environment. By 2017, one third of the desert has had greenery restored. Solar panels being installed to produce electricity are also reducing wind speeds, and the shaded areas preserve moisture.

== Economic value ==
Gigawatt-scale powerplants are being built in the desert, using solar panels and wind turbines. 455 gigawatts of wind and solar are planned. In contrast, the North American grid had 1213 GW total in 2022.
