= Shenzhen-Hong Kong Stock Connect =

Shenzhen-Hong Kong Stock Connect (SEHKSZSE; Chinese: 深港通) is a cross-boundary investment channel that connects the Shenzhen Stock Exchange and the Hong Kong Stock Exchange. Under the program, investors in each market are able to trade shares on the other market using their local brokers and clearing houses. Chinese Premier Li Keqiang announced the programme on 16 August 2016. The scheme launched on 5 December 2016.

== History ==
Two years after the launch of the Shanghai-Hong Kong trading link, a similar link was launched between the Shenzhen Stock Exchange and the Hong Kong Stock Exchange, broadening the range of A-shares international investors can trade.

== See also ==
- Shanghai-Hong Kong Stock Connect
