= Financial District, Los Angeles =

Neighborhood in California, US

Financial District
- Neighborhood of Los Angeles
- Los Angeles Financial District skyline view from a rooftop.

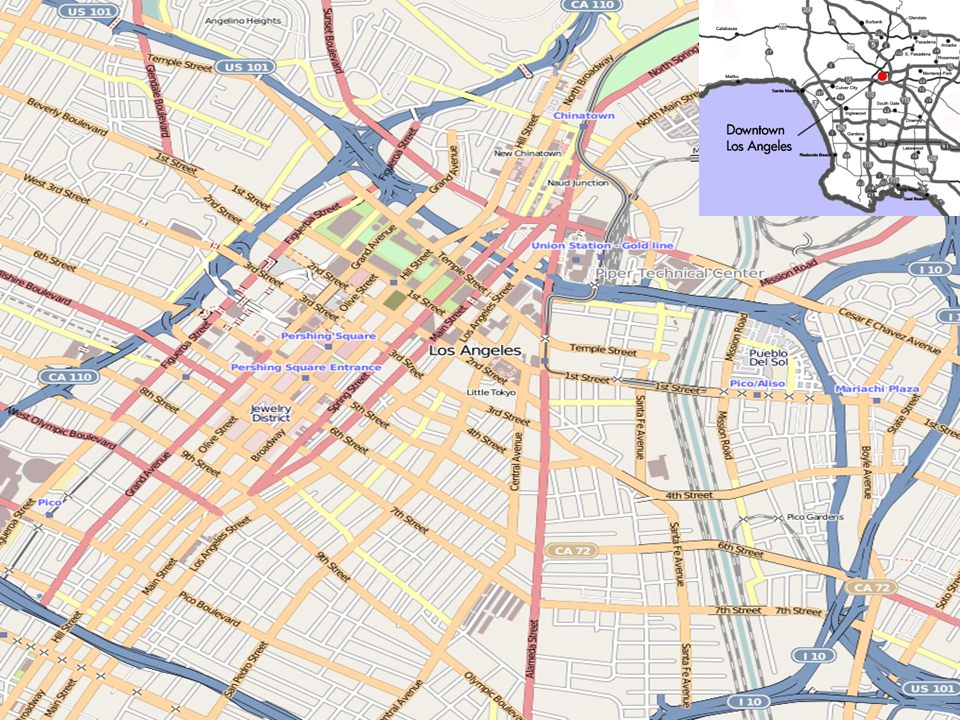
- Location within Downtown Los Angeles
- Coordinates: 34°03′03″N 118°15′18″W
- Country: United States
- State: California
- County: County of Los Angeles
- City: Los Angeles
- Area code: 213

The Financial District, also known as the Financial Core, is a neighborhood and central business district located in Downtown Los Angeles, California. It is bounded by the Harbor Freeway on the west, First Street to the north, Main Street and Hill Street to the east, and Olympic Boulevard and 9th Street to the south. The Financial District lies south of Bunker Hill, west of the Historic Core, north of South Park and east of the Harbor Freeway and Central City West.

Development of the Financial District accelerated in the late 20th century as part of Downtown Los Angeles's shift toward high-rise office and mixed‑use development. While much of neighboring Bunker Hill was redeveloped beginning in the 1960s, the Financial District retains historic early‑20th‑century buildings and modern skyscrapers. Older structures are especially concentrated along Seventh Street, once known as the city’s premier shopping corridor.

The district is home to numerous corporate headquarters, law firms, banks, hotels, and real estate companies, as well as major mixed‑use complexes such as the 7th and Flower area, a hub of the regional Los Angeles Metro Rail system. Prominent destinations include the FIGat7th shopping center, The Bloc, and a range of upscale restaurants and bars which cater to the downtown workforce and residents.

The Financial District forms part of Downtown Los Angeles Neighborhood Council area and falls within Los Angeles City Council Districts 14 and 10. Public safety services are provided by the Los Angeles Police Department through its Central Community Police Station.

Landmark towers that define the Financial District’s skyline include the U.S. Bank Tower, Gas Company Tower, and Ernst & Young Plaza. Along Seventh Street, restored early-20th-century structures such as the Financial Center Building (1924), Corporation Building (1915), Hellman Commercial Trust and Savings Bank, and Continental Building (1904) feature Beaux-Arts style architecture and classical details.

== History ==
What is now the Financial District was originally agricultural land, then a residential area of single-family homes, then around 1900 started attracting businesses as Victorian-era Downtown L.A. expanded south along Broadway past 3rd Street and "around the corner", west along Seventh Street. Around 1915, 7th Street between Broadway (on which corner stood Bullock's) and Figueroa Street became downtown's upscale shopping district. This began with J. W. Robinson's deciding to build their flagship store in 1915 on Seventh far to the west of the existing Broadway shopping district, between Hope and Grand streets. The Ville de Paris and Coulter's as well as numerous specialty shops came and rounded out the district. The area lost its exclusivity when the upscale downtown stores opened branches in Hollywood, Mid-Wilshire, Westwood and Pasadena in the late 1920s through the 1940s, notably the establishment of Bullock's upscale landmark branch Bullocks Wilshire in Mid-Wilshire in 1929.

Thirteen large office buildings opened between 1920 and 1928. By 1929, every plot on 7th between Figueroa and Los Angeles Streets had been developed.

The area remained an important, if not the most exclusive, center of retail and office space throughout the 1950s, but started a slow decline throughout the 1980s due to suburbanization. It was also the concentration of Downtown financial activity on Bunker Hill, a few blocks north. The flagship department stores like Bullock's (1983), Barker Brothers (1984) and Robinson's (1993) had closed and only the Broadway/Macy's at The Bloc, previously named Broadway Plaza remained. However, in 1986, the Seventh Market Place mall, now FIGat7th, opened, bringing a smaller retail cluster back to Seventh such as the 7th Street/Metro Center station opening in 1991.

The Financial District was created by the Los Angeles Community Redevelopment Agency to provide an alternative to the old Spring Street Financial District, which fell into decline in the second half of the 20th century.

Demand for apartments in downtown Los Angeles surged in 2010 and the years following. In 2015, thousands of apartments were under construction or proposed for the area around 8th Street.

== Historic photos ==
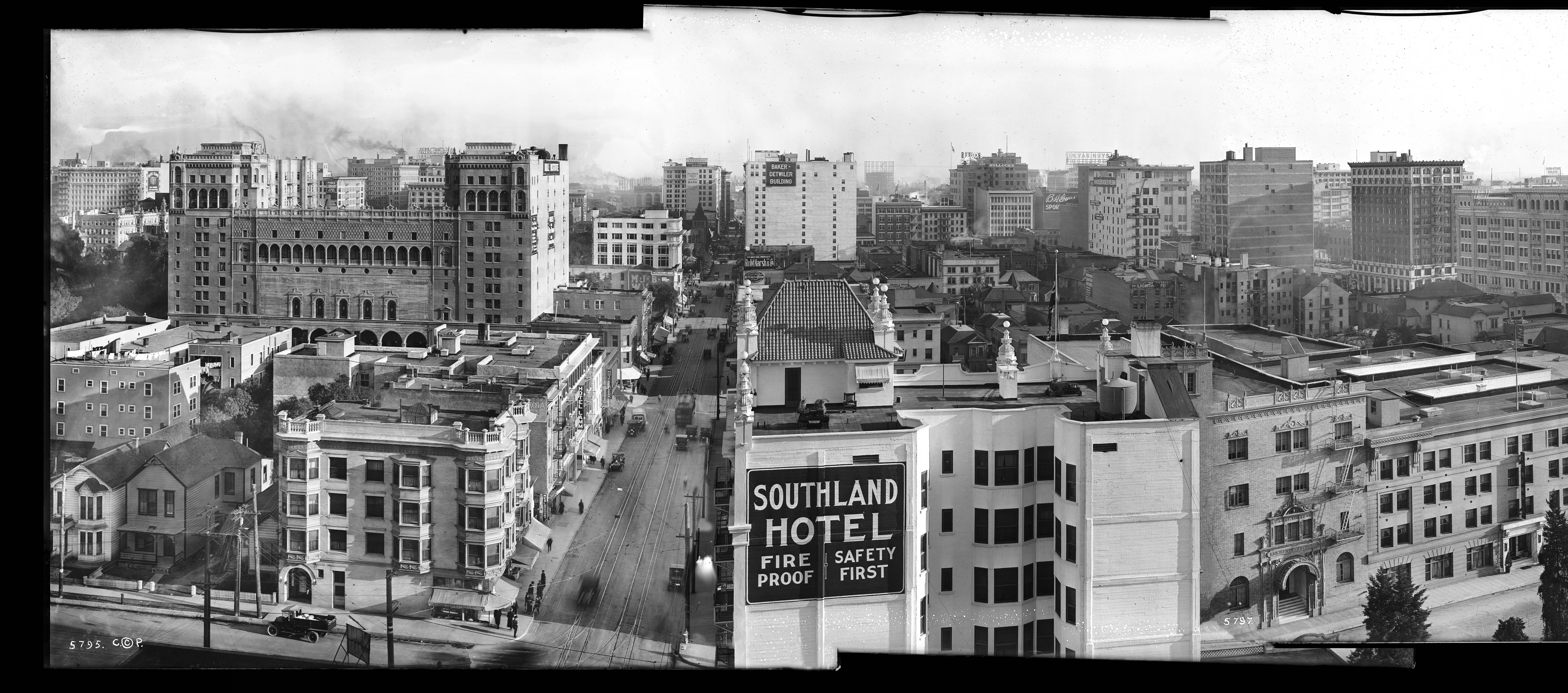
1916 view towards the east on 6th St. from near the Southland Hotel at SW corner of 6th and Flower. Baker-Detweiler Building is on south side of Pershing Square between Olive and Hill.

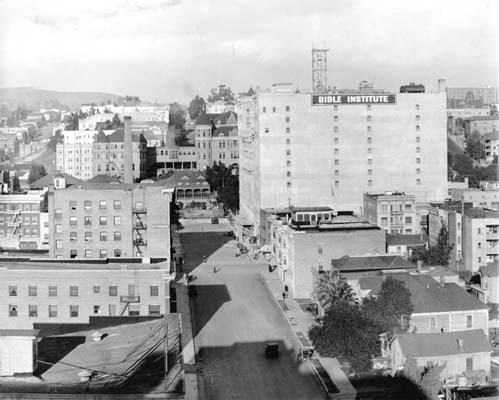
Looking north on Hope Street past Bible Institute of Los Angeles (now Biola University), 1912

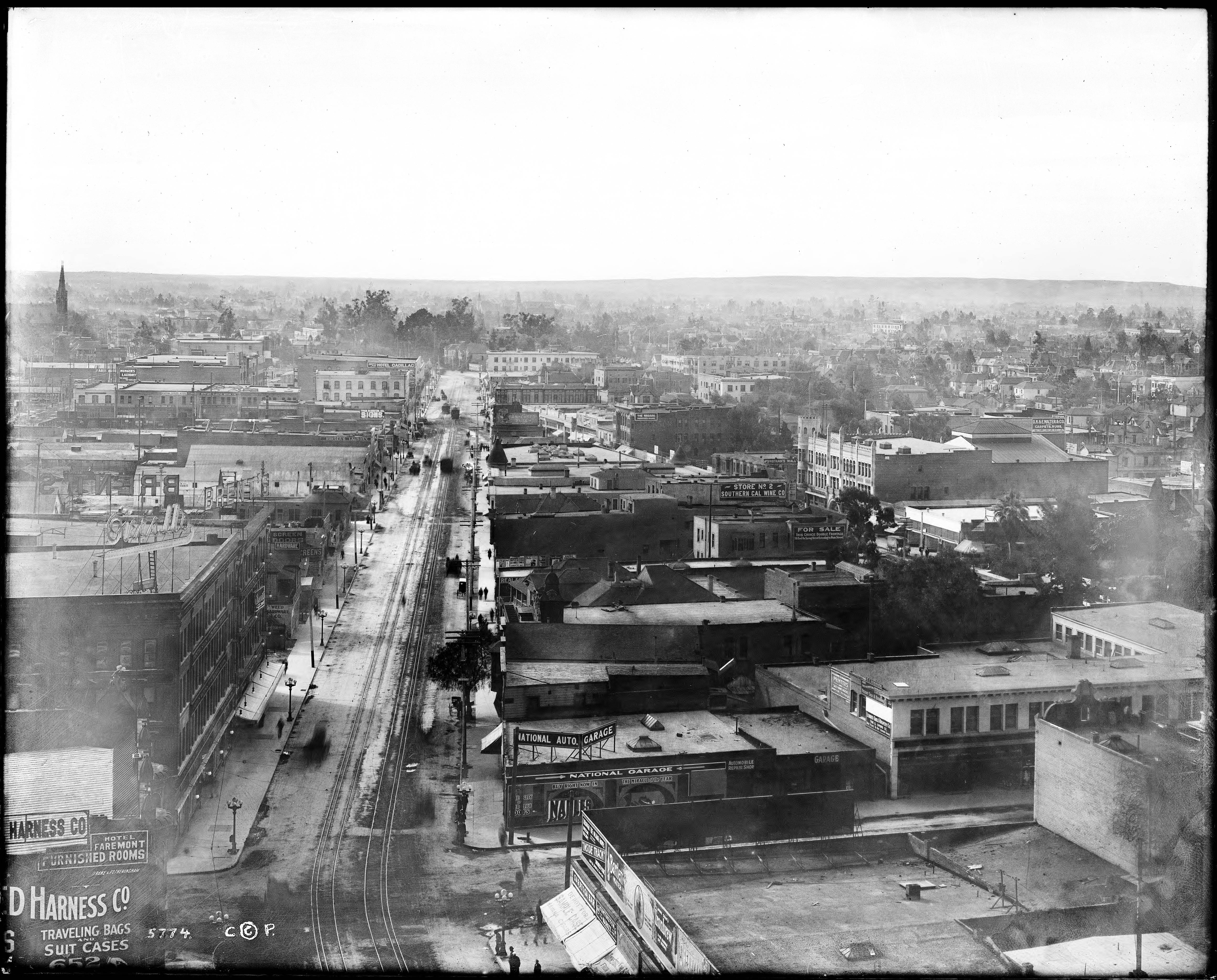
7th Street looking west from Main Street, 1907, not yet a commercial district

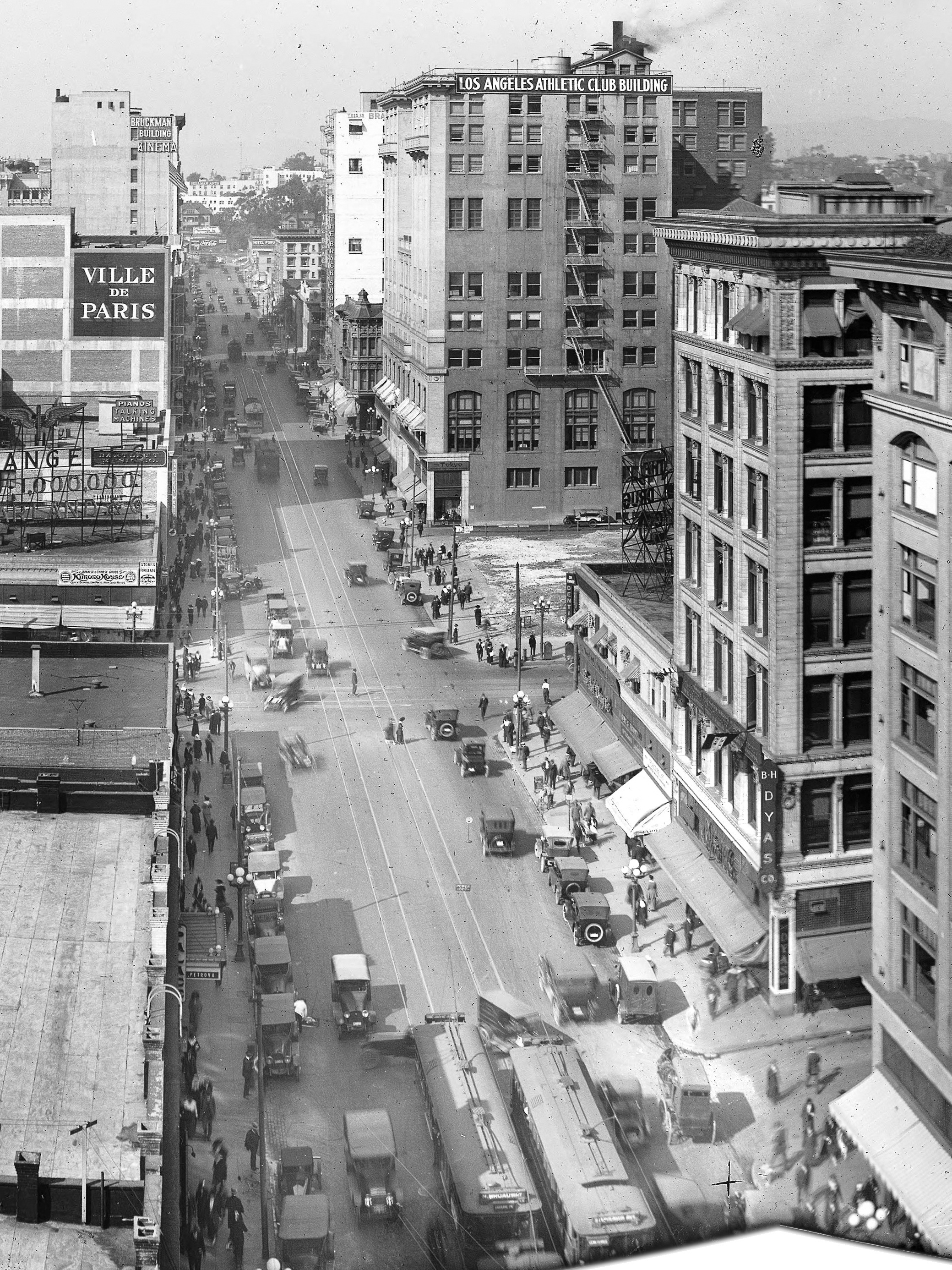
7th Street looking west from Broadway, 1917. Bullocks far right; B. H. Dyas sporting goods store, right; Ville de Paris, at left.

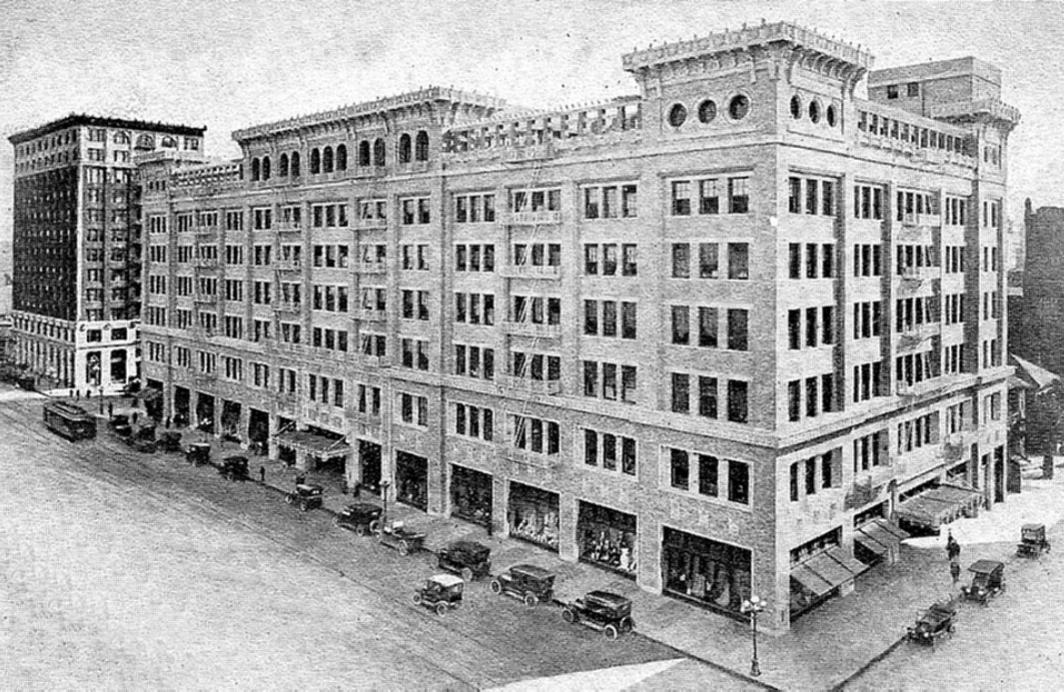
J. W. Robinson's flagship store on Seventh Street at launch, 1915. Robinson's locating on 7th marked the beginning of the street as the upmarket downtown shopping district

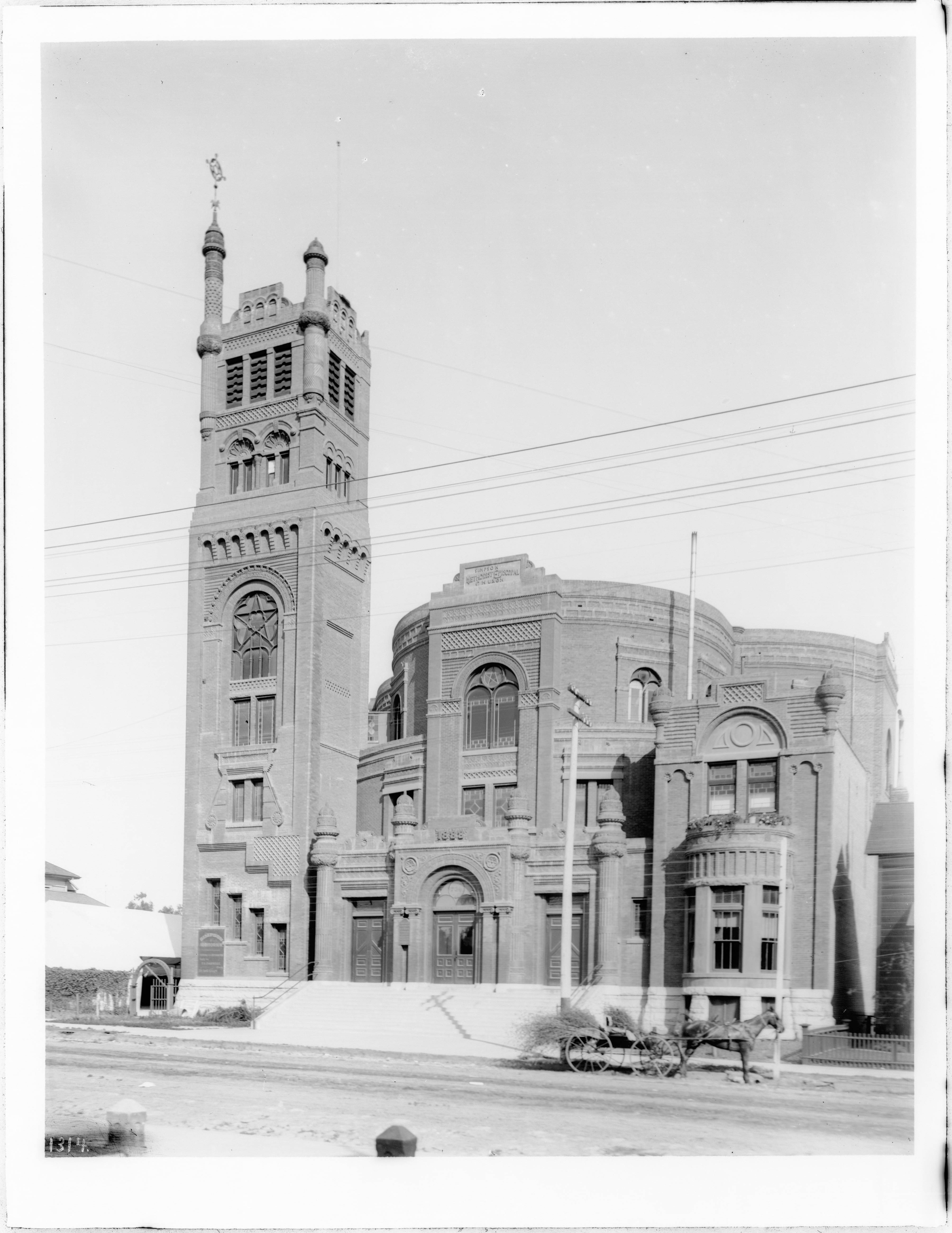
Simpson Methodist Episcopal Church, Hope between 7th/8th, c.1890-1905 (CHS-1314).jpg

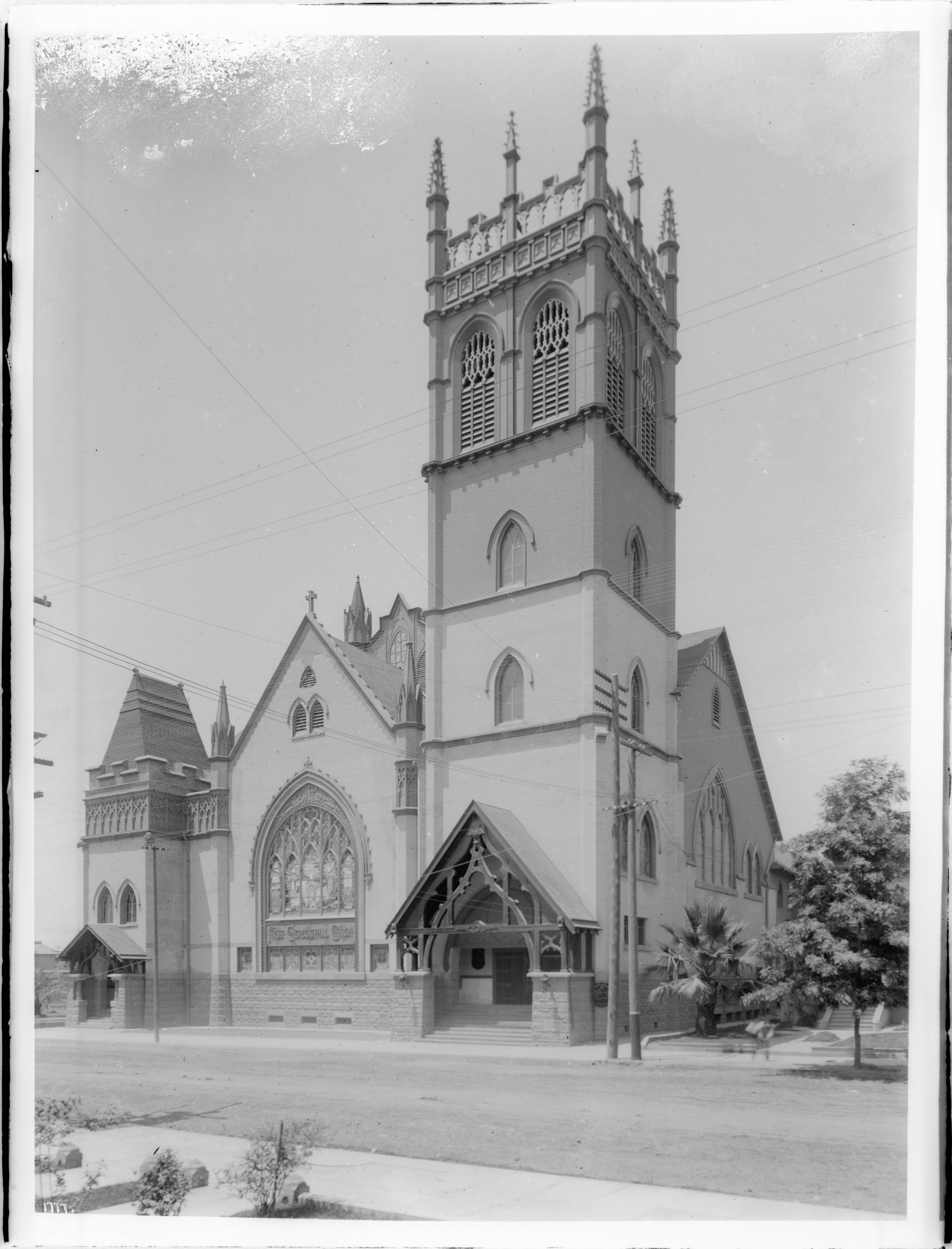
First Congregational Church on Hope Street between 8th/9th, c.1905

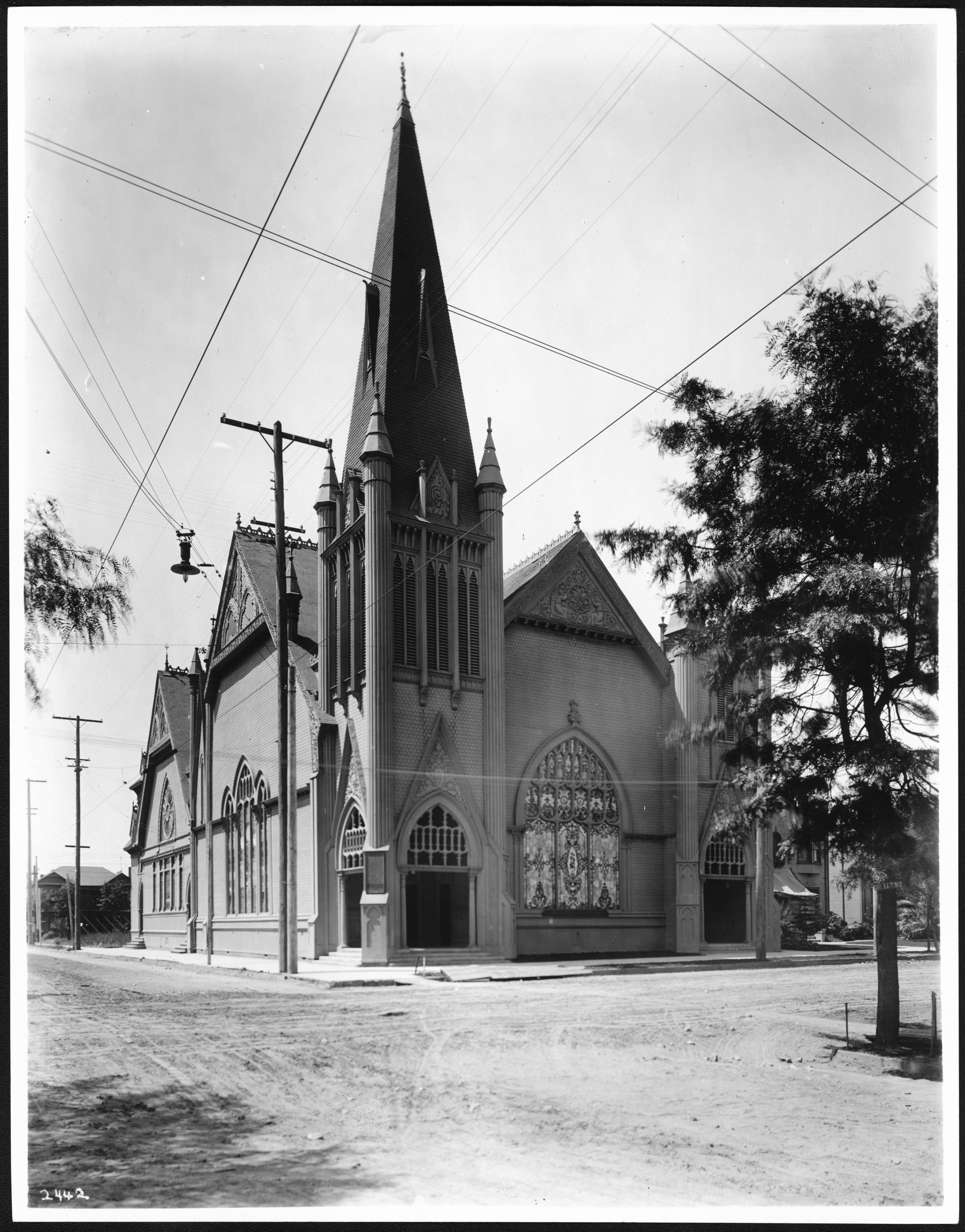
First Christian Church, Hope and 11th, c.1910

== Transportation ==
The Los Angeles County Metropolitan Transportation Authority (Metro Rail & Metro Busway), and LADOT (DASH & Commuter Express) provide heavy rail (subway), light rail, and local bus services throughout the Financial Core and to the Greater Los Angeles Area.

7th St/Metro Center station provides primary access to Metro B Line, D Line, A Line, and E Line.

== Landmarks ==
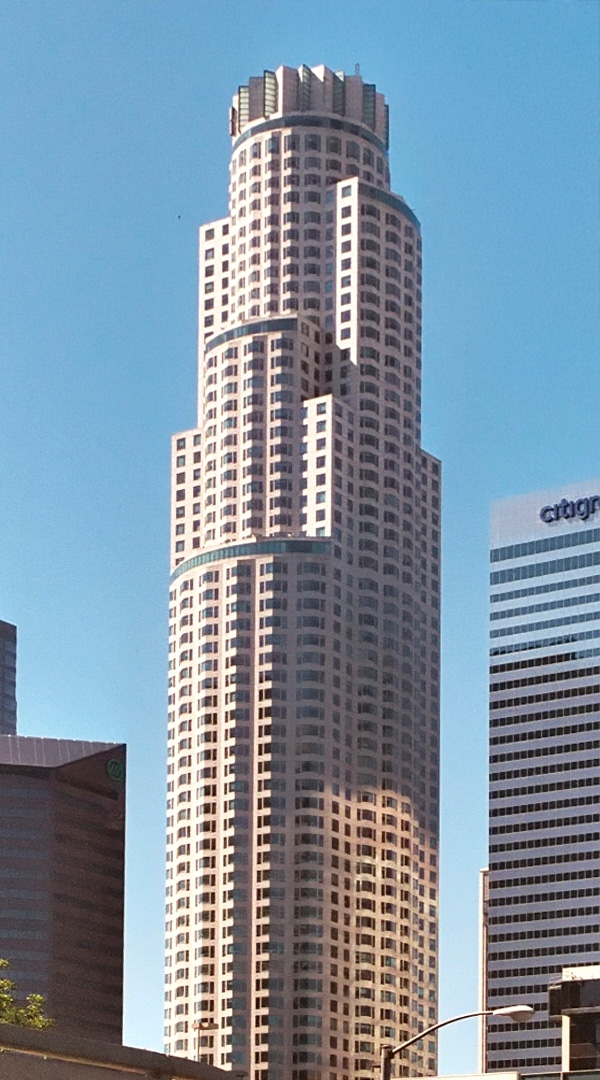
U.S. Bank Tower on West Fifth Street

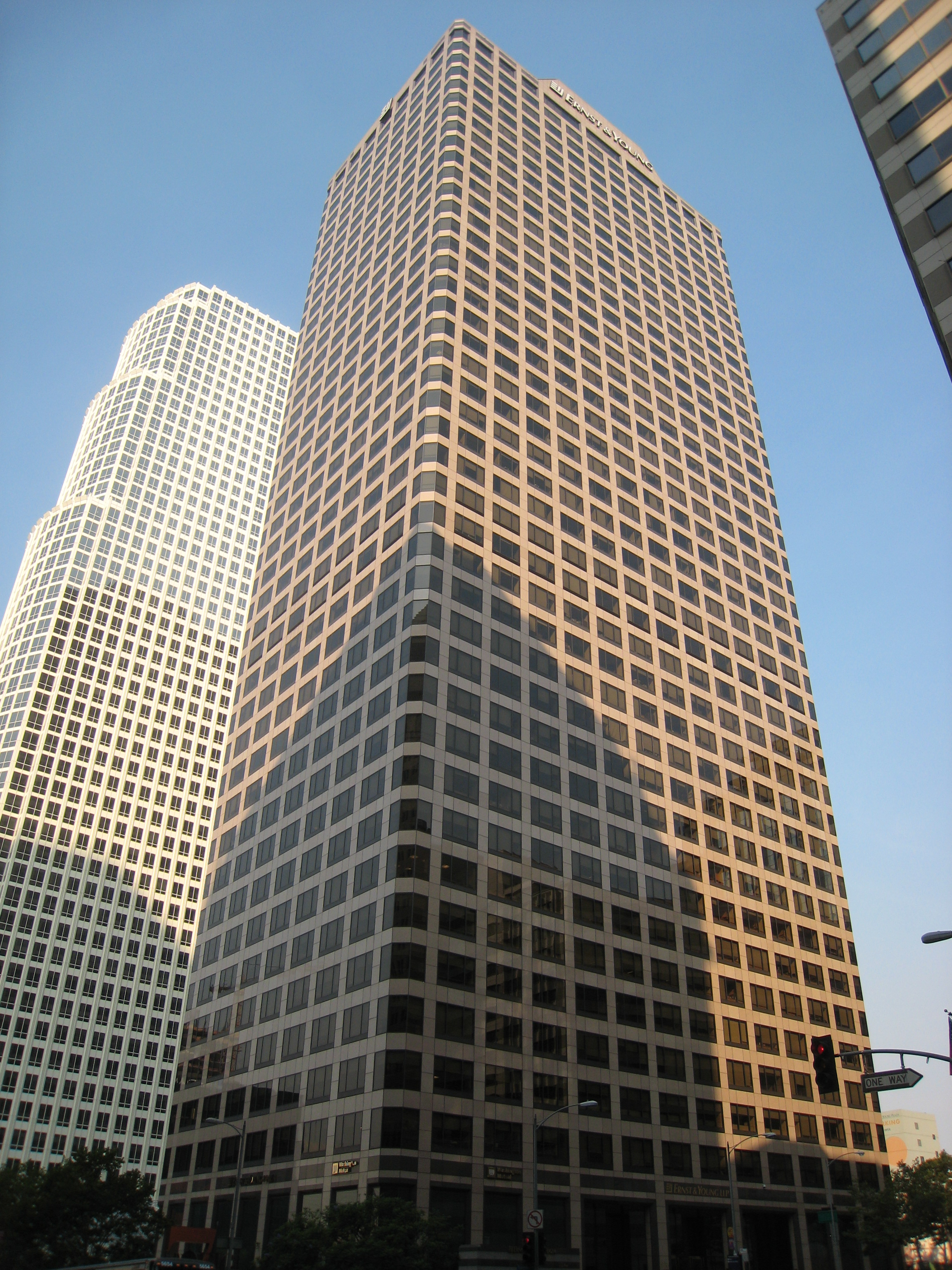
Ernst & Young Plaza, SW corner 7th/Figueroa

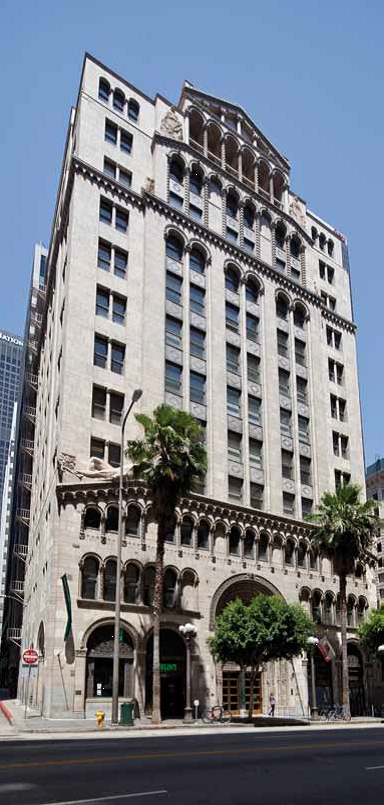
Fine Arts Building, N side of 7th, W of Flower

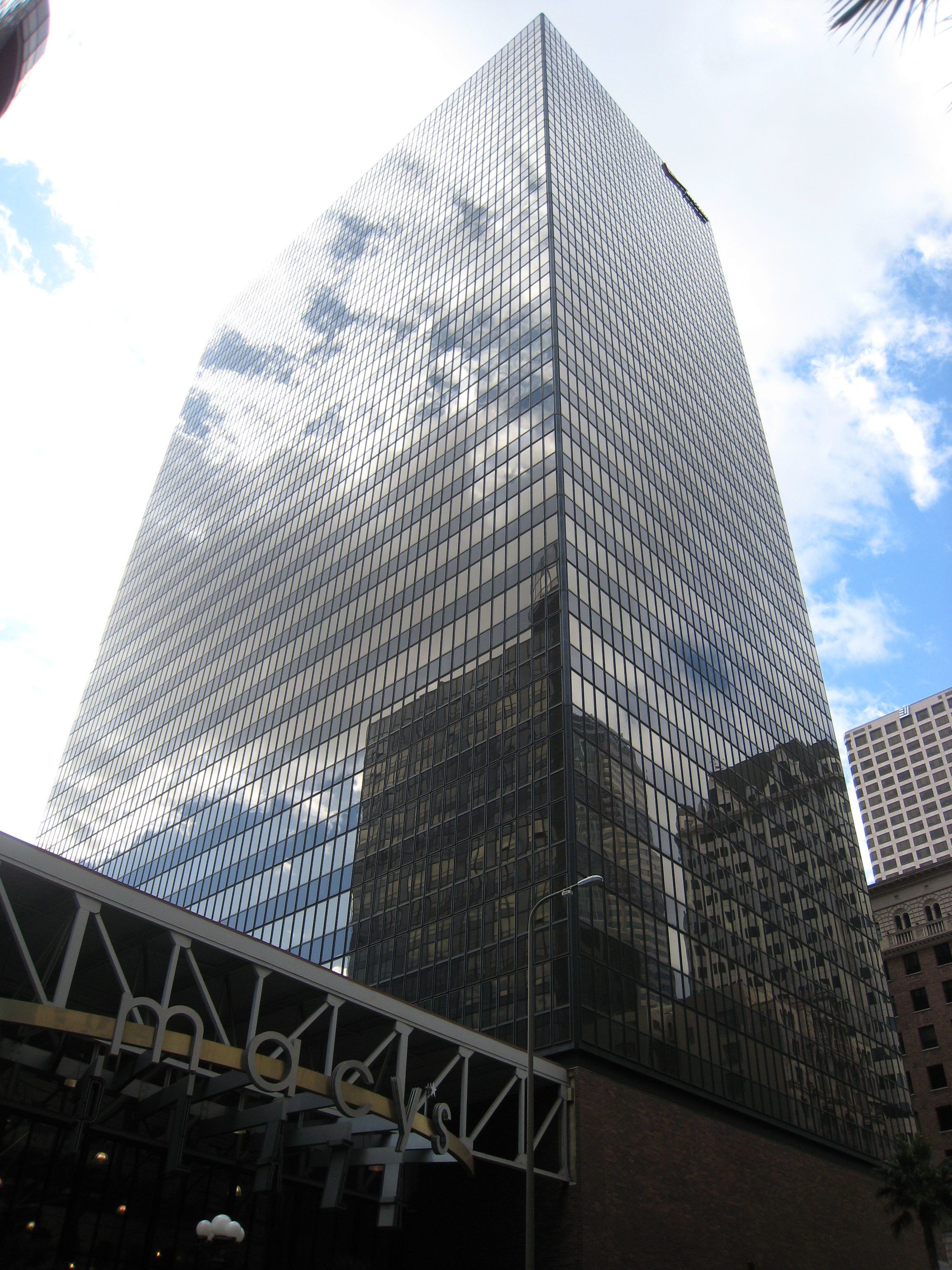
MCI Center (orig. Broadway Plaza), SE corner 7th/Flower

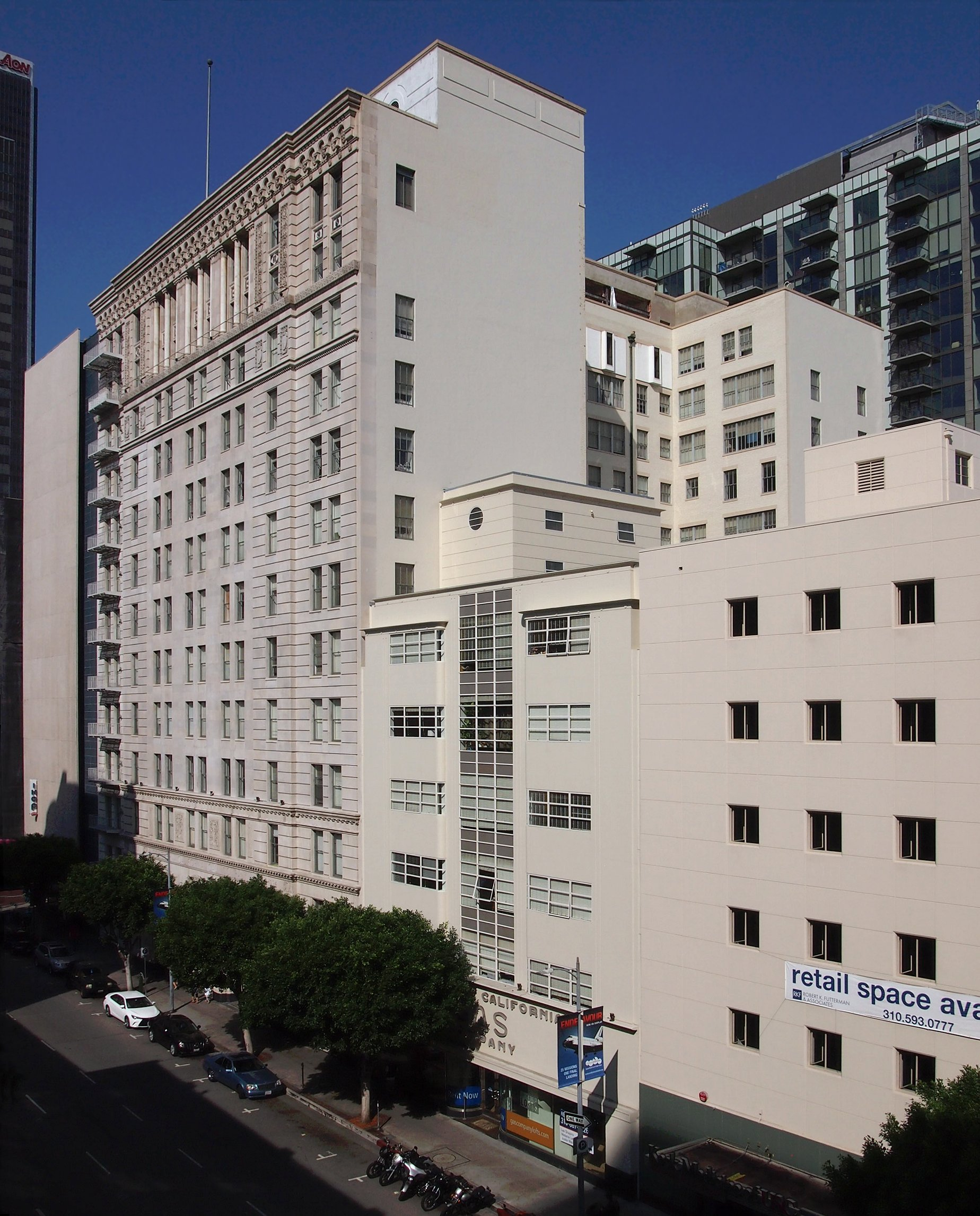
Southern California Gas Company Complex, SE corner 8th/Flower

Landmarks in the Financial District include the U.S. Bank Tower (on West Fifth Street), Ernst & Young Plaza, Fine Arts Building, MCI Center (originally Broadway Plaza), and Southern California Gas Company Complex.

== Map of buildings and historic sites ==
Landmarks are shown on the following street grid of the Financial District of Downtown Los Angeles.

=== Abbreviations and notes ===
- Abbreviations: DS=Department Store. res.=residential building
- Architectural styles: AD=Art Deco, BA=Beaux-Arts, BR=Baroque Revival, CR=Classical Revival, IRR=Italian Renaissance Revival, It=Italianate, Rom=Romanesque, RR=Renaissance Revival
- Architects: C&B=Curlett & Beelman, JP=John Parkison, P&B=Parkinson & Bergstrom, RBY=Robert Brown Young
- Italics indicate the building's current name or main tenant.
- Non-italics indicate a historic name or tenant of an existing building.
- *An asterisk indicates a demolished building.
For the area to the east, see Historic Core

	F I G U E R O A	Westin Bonaventure Hotel & Suites		F L O W E R	FourFortyFour South Flower	U.S. Bank Tower; OUE Skyspace		CalEdison DTLA (a.k.a. One Bunker Hill, 1931)		G R A N D	Gas Company Tower		O L I V E	Park Fifth Towers (2019, res.); Site of Hazard's Pavilion, Temple/Clune's/Philharmonic Auditorium
FIFTH STREET	F I G U E R O A			F L O W E R						G R A N D			O L I V E	
	F I G U E R O A	City National Plaza (ex-ARCO Center)		F L O W E R		Central Library				G R A N D	Millennium Biltmore Hotel		O L I V E	Pershing Square
	F I G U E R O A	City National Plaza (ex-ARCO Center)		F L O W E R	Superior Oil Company Building		H O P E	AT&T Center (Site of Savoy Hotel NW 6th/Grand)		G R A N D	PacMutual		O L I V E	Pershing Square
SIXTH STREET	F I G U E R O A			F L O W E R			H O P E			G R A N D			O L I V E	
Figueroa at Wilshire	F I G U E R O A			F L O W E R		Aon Center	H O P E	Lincoln Savings Bldg. (1955) now Library Court (res)	Milano Lofts (1925)	G R A N D	Douglas Oil Bldg. #3	Heron Bldg. (1921, Dodd)	O L I V E	
WILSHIRE BL.	F I G U E R O A			F L O W E R			H O P E			G R A N D	Douglas Oil Bldg. #3	Heron Bldg. (1921, Dodd)	O L I V E	
Wilshire Grand Center a.k.a. Korean Air Tower	F I G U E R O A	Figueroa (Home Savingss) Tower	Fine Arts Building	F L O W E R	Roosevelt Building, 7th Street/Metro Center subway		H O P E	Union Oil Bldg. (1923)		G R A N D	Quinby Bldg. (1926), Bronson Bldg. (The Collection) (1913)	Bank of Italy (1922), Brock and Co. Bldg. (1922)	O L I V E	Los Angeles Athletic Club (1912)
SEVENTH STREET	F I G U E R O A			F L O W E R			H O P E			G R A N D			O L I V E	
Ernst & Young Plaza, FIGat7th	F I G U E R O A	Barker Bros. DS Bldg.		F L O W E R	MCI Center (orig. Broadway Plaza), 7th Street/Metro Center subway		H O P E	J.W. Robinson's DS Bldg.		G R A N D	Brockman Building (1912, once home to Haggarty's DS)	Coulter's DS (later Myer Siegel, Dohrmann's, now The Mandel)	O L I V E	Ville de Paris DS, now L.A. Jewelry Mart (1917)
777 Tower	F I G U E R O A			F L O W E R			H O P E			G R A N D			O L I V E	
EIGHTH STREET	F I G U E R O A			F L O W E R			H O P E			G R A N D			O L I V E	
	F I G U E R O A			F L O W E R	Southern California Gas Company Complex	8th+Hope	H O P E			G R A N D			O L I V E	
