= The Bloc =

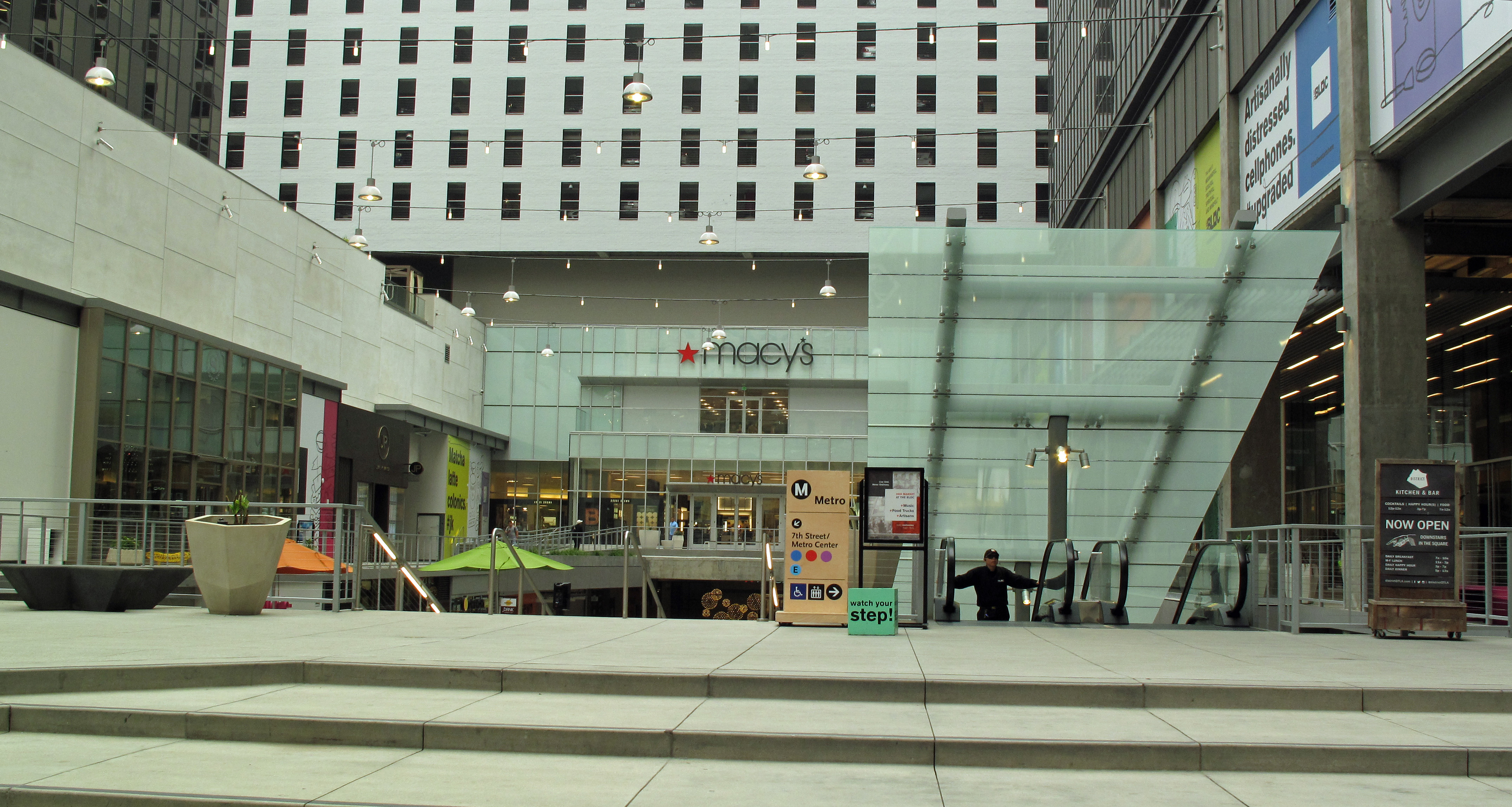
- Entrance to The Bloc along 7th Street, 2017
- Location: 700 S. Flower Street; Los Angeles, California
- Coordinates: 34.048334°N 118.258643°W
- Opened: November 18, 1973; 52 years ago (original) 2015 (current)
- Closed: 2015 (original)
- Developer: Ogden Development
- Owner: National Real Estate Advisors (major shareholder); Sun Hung Kai Properties (minority shareholder)
- Num. of anchor tenants: 1 (0 open)
- Public transit: 7th St/Metro Center
- Website: theblocla.com

The Bloc (stylized as THE BLOC), formerly Macy's Plaza and Broadway Plaza, is an open-air shopping mall in downtown Los Angeles at 700 South Flower Street, in the Financial District. It opened in 1973, built around the flagship store of The Broadway department store chain, later Macy's, until its 2025 closure. Other tenants include LA Fitness, Nordstrom Local, UNIQLO, and the Sheraton Grand Los Angeles hotel. The shopping center has its own entrance to the 7th Street/Metro Center station of the Los Angeles Metro Rail system. The Bloc tends to connect the financial, fashion, jewelry, and theater districts and the 7th Street Metro Center Station, meaning where four Downtown Los Angeles lines converge more.

== History ==
=== Broadway Plaza (1973–1996) ===
The Broadway Plaza complex opened on November 18, 1973. It was designed by noted architect Charles Luckman and was constructed by Ogden Development, of which Luckman was the head. The $65 million to finance the complex came from the Prudential Insurance Company of America.

The complex consisted of two towers on either side (a 32-story office building and the 24-story Hyatt Regency Los Angeles hotel) and an enclosed shopping mall between them, anchored by the new 3-story flagship store of The Broadway department store chain, with a six-level, 1550-space parking garage atop it. The shopping center also included an Oshman's Sporting Goods, an underground food court and several smaller non-chain shops. The complex was described by its builders as a "megastructure" and claimed to be the first enclosed "suburban" type shopping center in a downtown area in the United States.

=== Macy's Plaza (1996-2015) ===
The mall was renamed Macy's Plaza in 1996, after Federated Department Stores bought The Broadway and rebranded their stores as Macy's. In 2005, the Hyatt Regency was renamed the Sheraton Los Angeles Downtown. Bally Total Fitness (which occupied the Oshman's space) closed and re-opened as LA Fitness in 2012. In 2013, Macy's Plaza was acquired by Ratkovich, who announced plans to remodel the imposing and aging "monolithic" red brick fortress-like building, with a more open plan.

=== The Bloc (2015–present) ===
A majority of the stores in Macy's Plaza closed in early-2015 for the conversion into a new open-air plaza, given the name The Bloc. The renovation forced many long-time tenants, including Bath and Body Works, Express, Lady Foot Locker, Victoria's Secret, and original 1973 opening tenant Carl's Jr. in the underground food court to close. Many of these tenants, including Victoria's Secret and Bath and Body Works, moved to the nearby newly-renovated FIGat7th outdoor mall. LA Fitness, Macy's, and the Sheraton hotel remained open during the renovations. LA Fitness and the United States Postal Service branch at the mall remained operational but were forced to move to street level. In May 2015, the large "Macy's" sign was taken down and the large glass atrium roof was removed, officially opening the atrium of the once enclosed mall to the sky.

The Bloc Los Angeles opened in October 2015. The complex was designed to be walkable, an indoor-outdoor mall akin to the nearby FIGat7th or the Americana at Brand. It became the first development in the Los Angeles area to have its own access to the LA Metro. This possibility was planned for when the subway line was constructed under Flower Street in 1989. The new plaza contained Los Angeles' first Alamo Drafthouse Cinema, an Austin-based movie theatre chain, and Starbucks Evenings, a Starbucks store concept that serves alcoholic beverages, along with Macy's, GNC, and LA Fitness. Other restaurants include Hatch, Urban Oven, Miss Cheese Tea Cafe, CoffeeWalk YogurTalk, Everytable and District DTLA. In 2016, following a renovation, the Sheraton Los Angeles Downtown was renamed the Sheraton Grand Los Angeles.

Due to delays in construction, The Bloc for a while had trouble finding tenants, but once Alamo Drafthouse officially signed their lease, more tenants started signing leases. The Bloc soon had 60 percent of the office spaces leased and 76 percent of the retail space leased. Soon after opening, the mall hosted a number of pop-up stores, including Joachim Splichal’s wine, All Flavor on Melrose, Yorkshire Square Brewing, and Tony’s Darts Away.

In 2018, Uniqlo opened at the mall.

In 2026, Miss Cheese Tea Cafe opened at the mall's plaza level.

A 53 story, 710-foot residential tower addition was proposed above the parking podium in 2021. The 250,000 sq. ft. Macy's closed on March 9, 2025. It is set to be replaced by a social club focusing on racquet sports named Ballers.
