= HowGood =

American sustainable food rating company

- Company type: Private
- Founded: 2007 as Scyve
- Headquarters: New York City, U.S.
- Website: www.howgood.com

HowGood is an American sustainable food rating company based in Brooklyn, New York. It comprises the world's largest database on sustainable food. It develops markets and operates a program in grocery stores designed to provide a sustainability score for food products using up to 60 industry-specific indicators.

HowGood was co-founded as "Scryve" by Alexander Gillett and Arthur Gillett in 2007. Starting in 2014, HowGood's food sustainability ratings were made public with their mobile app, available to iPhone and Android users. On September 17, 2014, HowGood closed a $2 million round of funding from participating investors including FirstMark Capital, Highline Venture Partners, Serious Change LP, Jake Lodwick and Joanne Wilson.
