= Joanne Wilson =

American businesswoman and investor

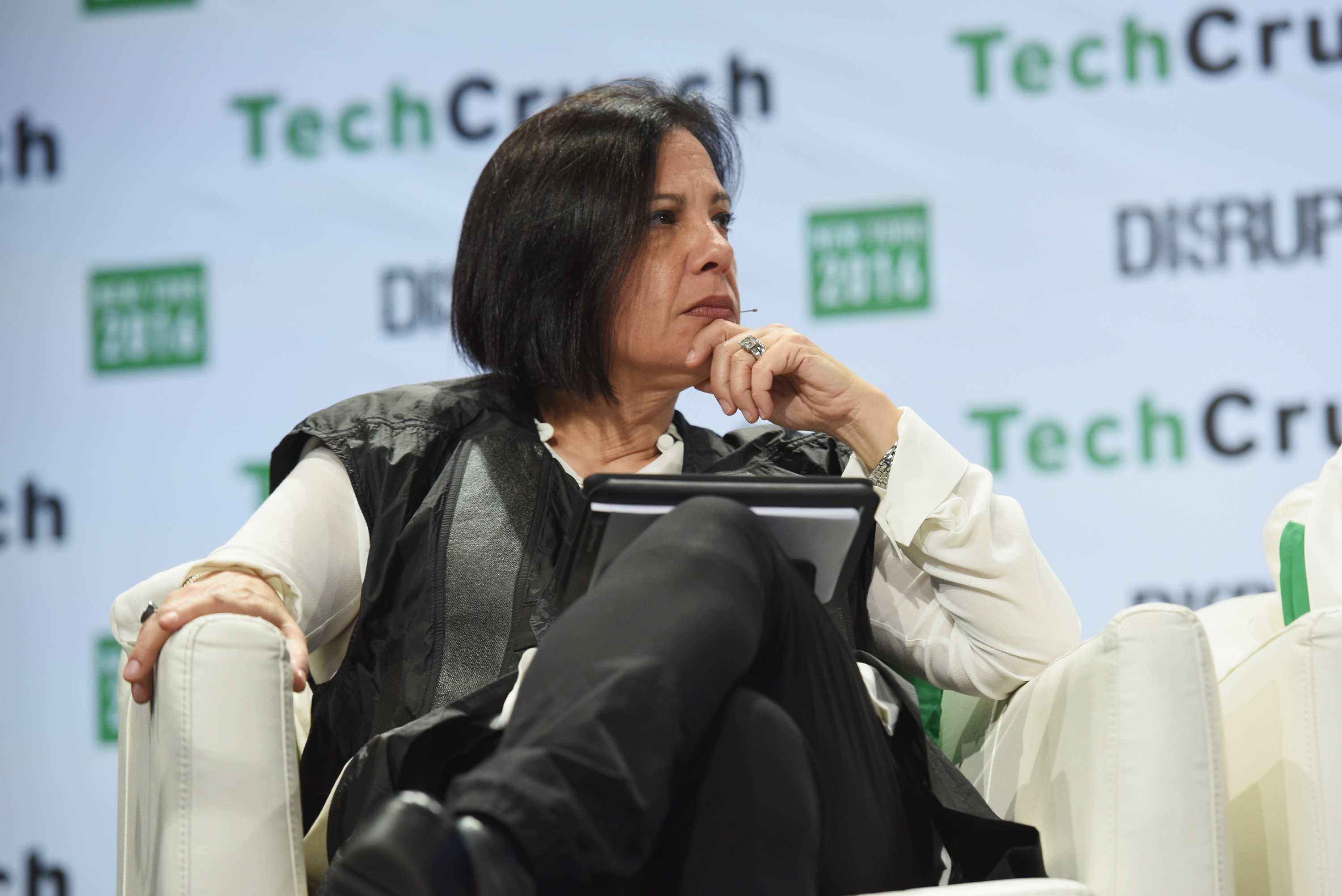
- Wilson in 2016
- Born: 1961 (age 64–65)
- Education: Simmons College
- Occupations: businesswoman, angel investor, philanthropist
- Spouse: Fred Wilson
- Website: gothamgal.com

Joanne Wilson (born 1961) is an American businesswoman, philanthropist, and angel investor. She is known for backing female-founded companies.

== Biography ==
=== Early life and education ===
Wilson was born in 1961. She studied at Simmons College in Boston and graduated in 1983.

=== Career ===
Early in her career, Wilson spent four years in retail apparel at Macy's before moving onto manage garment industry business. She later joined Silicon Alley Reporter, a magazine and event startup. She also chaired MOUSE (Making Opportunities in Upgrading Schools in Education), a non-profit bringing technology to inner-city schools.

Wilson began investing in 2007, later co-founding the Gotham Gal Venture along side her husband while also operating entrepreneurship blog Gotham Gal. In 2010, she co-founded and co-chaired an annual Women Entrepreneurs Festival.

From 2010 to 2015, she chaired the board of Hot Bread Kitchen, a non-profit training women and minority bakers. In 2018, she co-chair of Path Forward, an organization supporting individuals returning to workforce following caregiving leave.

Wilson is also the founder and CEO of Gotham, a retail enterprise expanding to four locations. She served on the board of Friends of the High Line for fifteen years and chaired the Public Housing Community Fund, which supports New York City Housing Authority residents.

In addition to her venture work, Wilson has been involved in real estate development since 2009.

== Investments ==
Wilson made her first investment into Lockhart Steele's startup Curbed. Her early portfolio includes investments in Food52, Rick's Picks, DailyWorth, Hot Bread Kitchen and Scoot, Blue Bottle Coffee, coffee roaster, Spoon University and residential platform Nestio.

A significant portion of her investments are focuses on women-led startups. As of 2017, she had backed over 90 companies founded by women.

In 2017, Wilson made two angel investments in the cannabis industry: Octavia Wellness and Beboe.

== Personal life ==
Wilson is married to venture capitalist Fred Wilson, a cofounder of Union Square Ventures. The couple resides in New York City with their three children. In 2016, they were named to Crain's New York Business "Power Couples" list.

== Bibliography ==
- Saujani, Reshma (2013). Women Who Don't Wait in Line. Houghton Mifflin Harcourt. ISBN 978-0-544-02778-7 – via Google Books.
- Feld, Brad; Batchelo, Amy (2013). Startup Life: Surviving and Thriving in a Relationship with an Entrepreneur. John Wiley & Sons. ISBN 978-1-118-49386-1 – via Google Books.
- Krotz, Joanna (2015). Being Equal Doesn't Mean Being The Same. Motivational Press. ISBN 978-1628652505.
- Pimsleur, Julia (2015). Million Dollar Women: The Essential Guide for Female Entrepreneurs Who Want to Go Big. Simon & Schuster. ISBN 978-1-4767-9029-9 – via Google Books.
- Waldman Rodriguez, Jessamyn; Turshen, Julia (2015). The Hot Bread Kitchen Cookbook: Artisanal Baking from Around the World. Clarkson Potter/Publishers. ISBN 978-0-8041-8618-6 – via Google Books.
- Anid, Nada; Cantileno, Laurie; Morrow, Monique J.; Zafar, Rahilla (2016). The Internet of Women: Accelerating Culture Change. River Publishers. ISBN 978-87-93379-68-8 – via Google Books.
- Cabot, Heather; Walravens, Samantha (2017). Geek Girl Rising: Inside the Sisterhood Shaking Up Tech. St. Martin's Publishing Group. ISBN 978-1-250-11226-2 – via Google Books.
