= 777 Tower =

Office building in Los Angeles, California

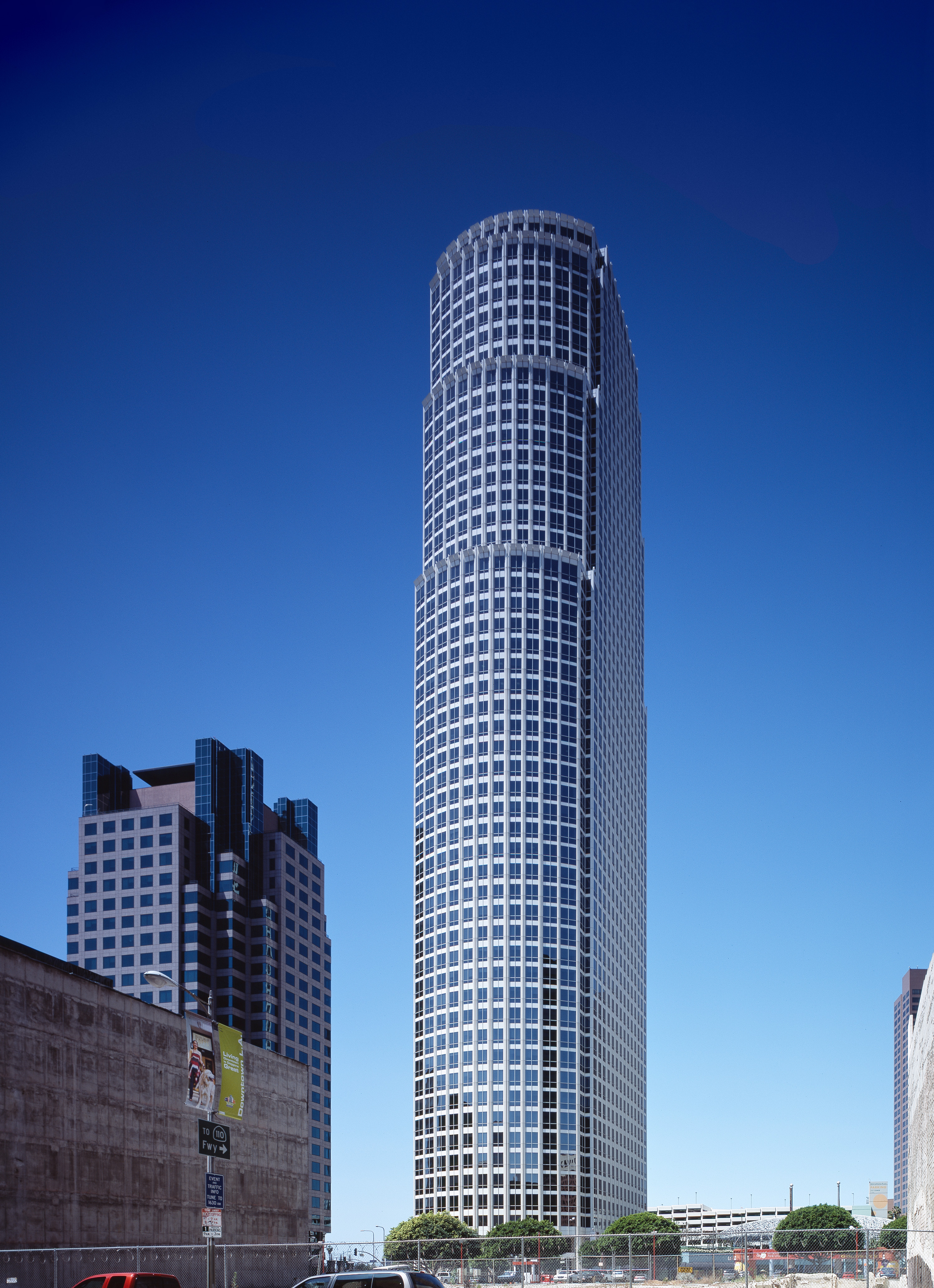
- Alternative names: 7th + FIG; Citicorp Plaza; Pelli Tower

General information
- Status: Completed
- Type: Commercial offices
- Location: 777 South Figueroa Street; Los Angeles, California
- Coordinates: 34.04845°N 118.26138°W
- Construction started: 1988
- Completed: 1991
- Cost: US$250 million
- Owner: Brookfield Properties

Height
- Roof: 220.98 m (725.0 ft)

Technical details
- Floor count: 55
- Floor area: 1,025,000 sq ft (95,200 m^{2})
- Lifts/elevators: 33

Design and construction
- Architect: César Pelli
- Developer: South Figueroa Plaza Associates
- Structural engineer: John A. Martin & Associates
- Main contractor: Peck/Jones (now Jones & Jones)

777 Tower (originally known as Citicorp Center and also known as Pelli Tower) is a 221 m (725 ft), 52-story high-rise office building designed by César Pelli located at 777 South Figueroa Street in the Financial District of Downtown Los Angeles, California.

Developed in 1991 by South Figueroa Plaza Associates as Citicorp Plaza, the building spans approximately 1,025,000 sq ft (95,200 m^{2}) and has a three-story Italian marble lobby. The exterior is clad with sculpted white metal and glass. The tower is adjacent to the FIGat7th shopping center, which opened in 1986 as "Seventh Market Place" and had two department stores: Bullock's and May Co. It was purchased from Maguire Properties by owner Brookfield Properties.

The building's owner, Brookfield, defaulted on 777 Tower and the Gas Company Tower, also in Los Angeles, in 2023.

A shot of the tower under construction can be seen looking from 12th street in the 1989 comedy Police Academy 6: City Under Siege. It also plays a role in the finale to the 2001 film Swordfish, where a Skyhook helicopter deposits a bus full of hostages on the helipad.

The ground breaking ceremony was on September 7, 1988.

== Tenants ==
- American International Group
- Arnold & Porter
- Brown & Riding Insurance Services
- RBC Capital Markets
- Zurich

== Awards ==
- 1993 LA Business Council Best High Rise Commercial Bldg
- 1994 LA Business Council Beautification Award
- 1996 Building Owners and Managers Association Building of the Year Award

== Gallery ==
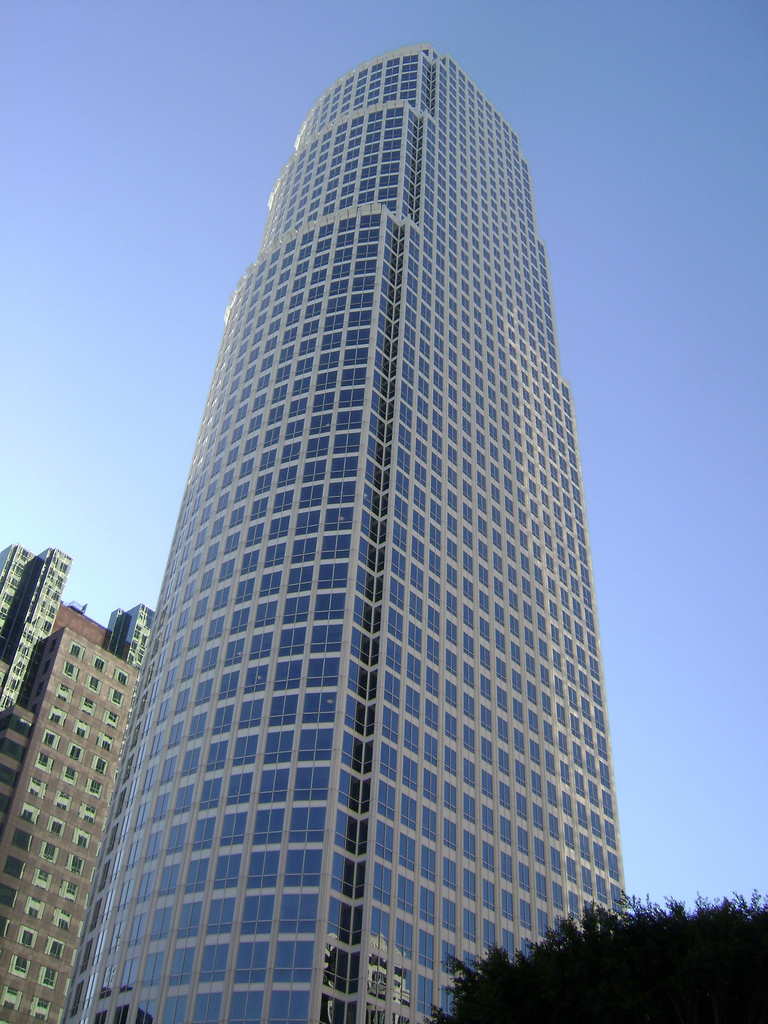
777 Tower

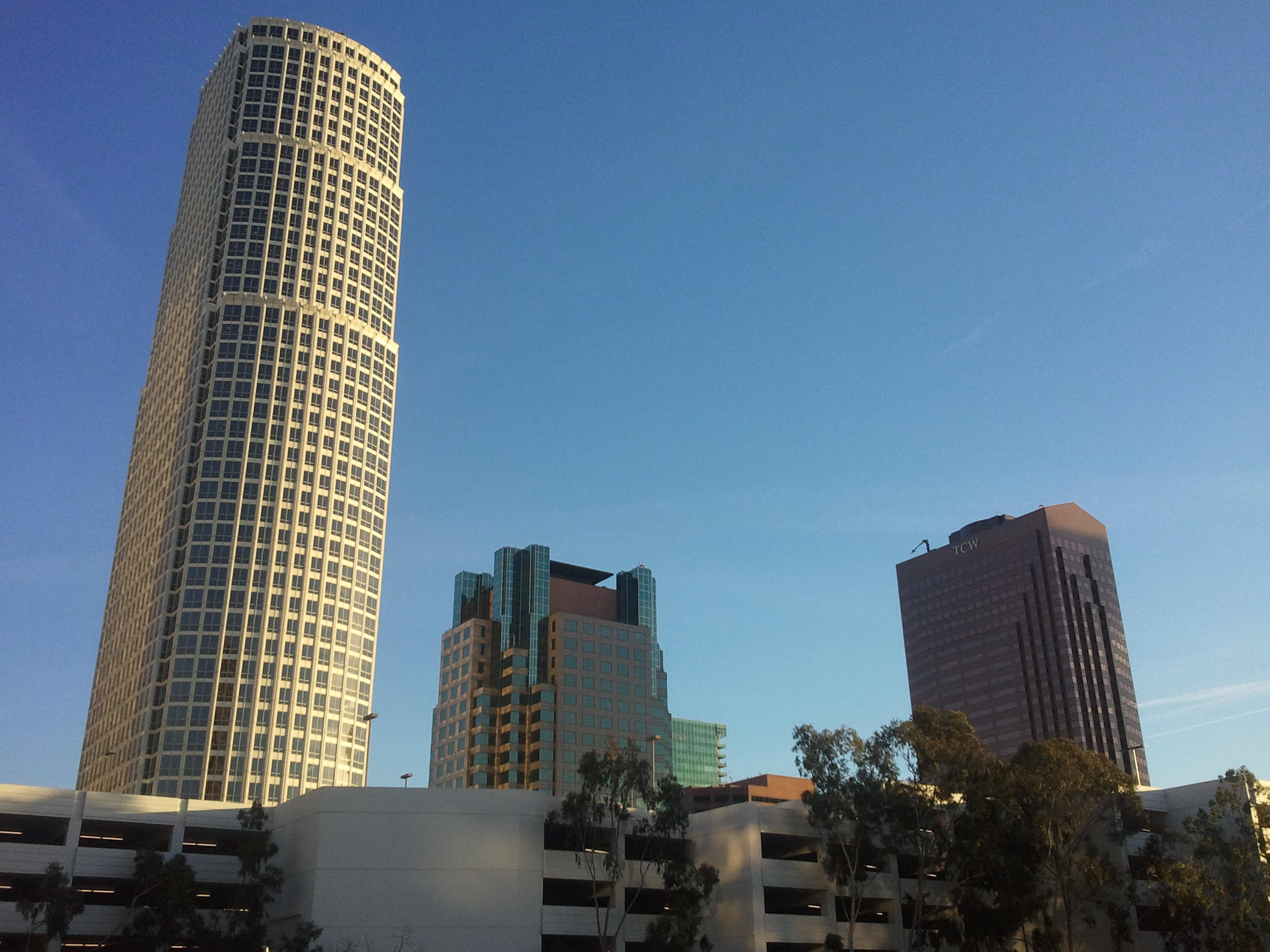
777 Tower, 801 Tower, and TCW Tower (left to right)

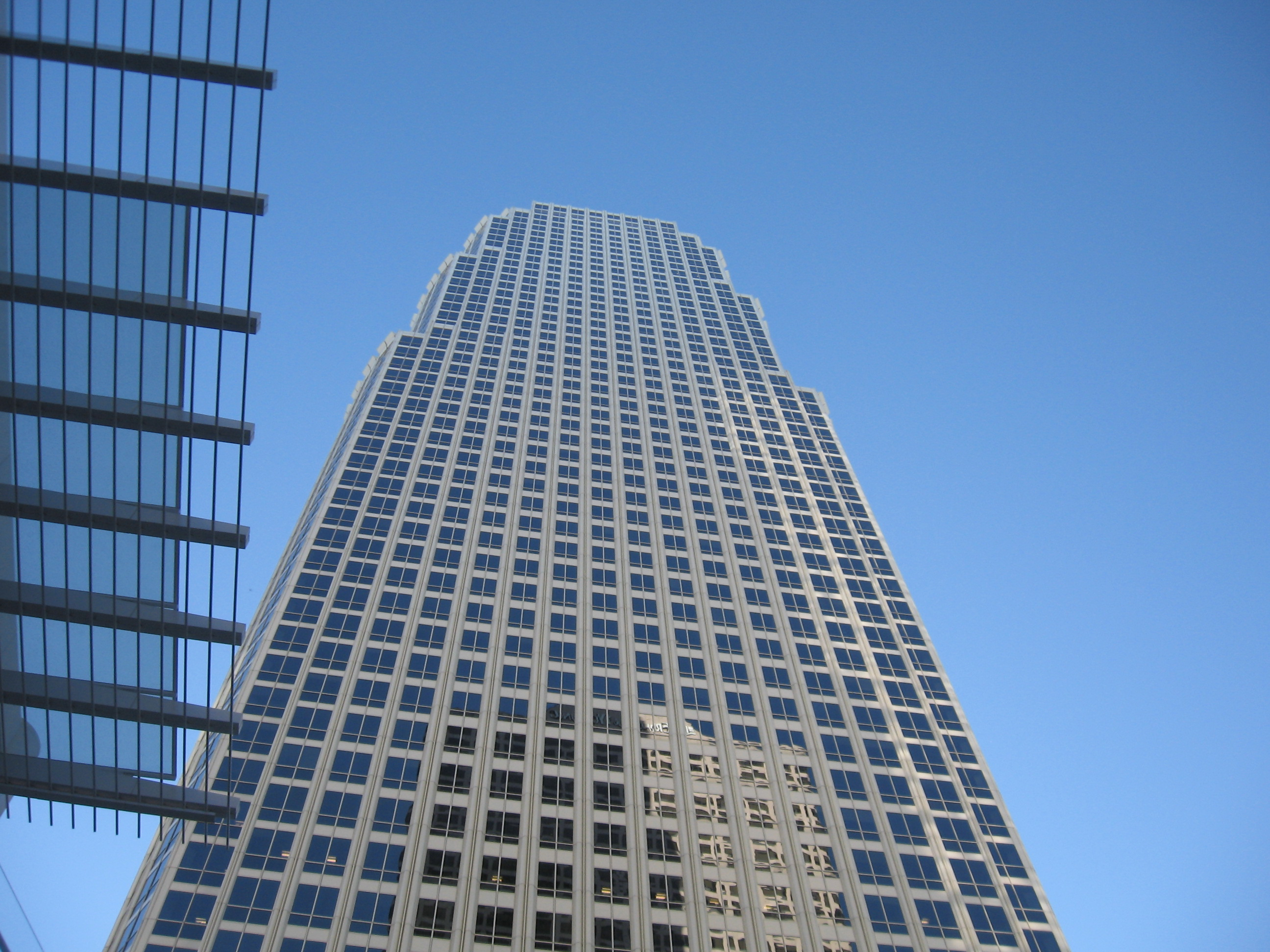
Looking up to the 777 Tower from 7th+Fig Plaza

== See also ==
- List of tallest buildings in Los Angeles
