= FIGat7th =

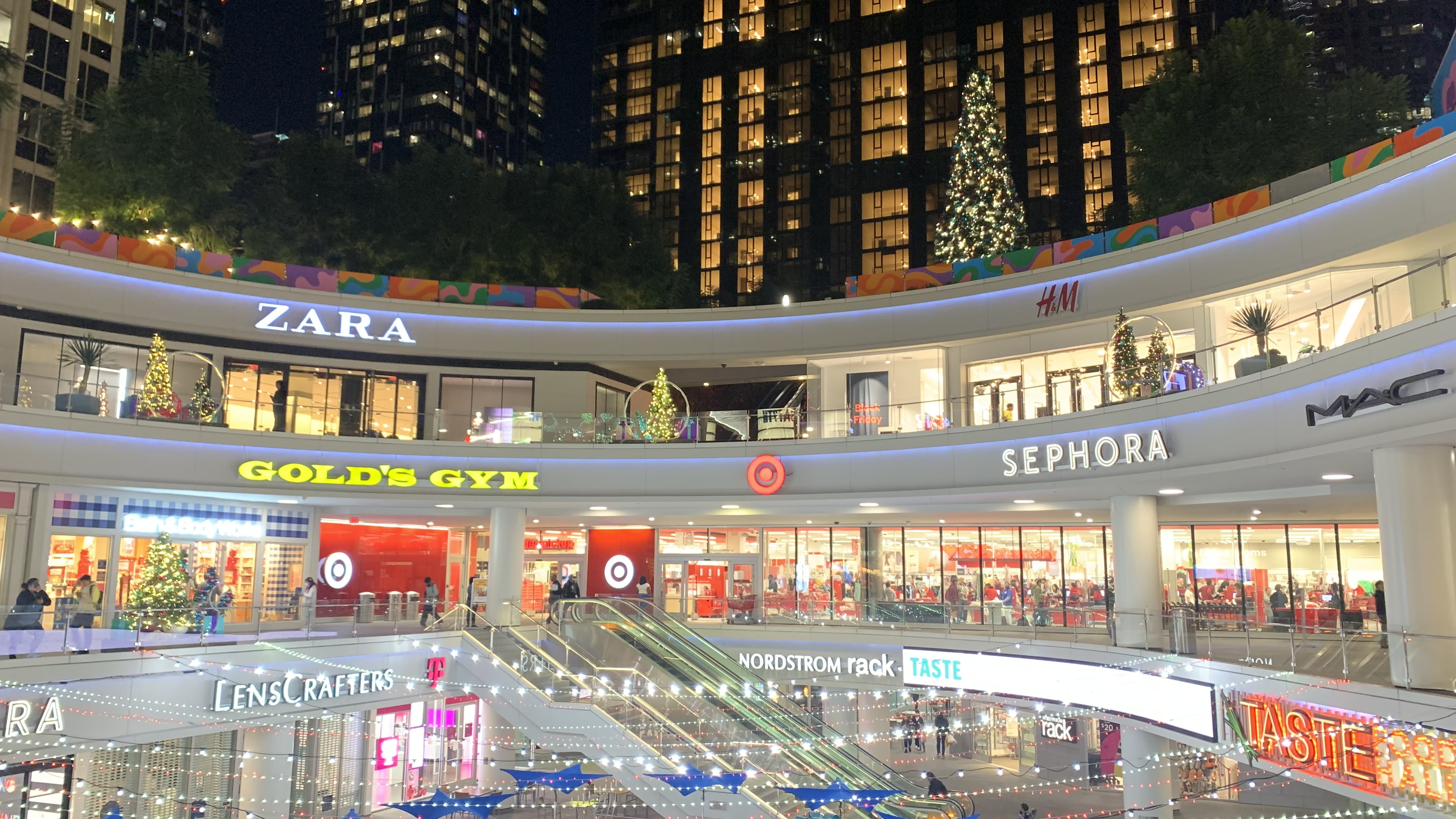
- Target anchor store in FIGat7th
- Coordinates: 34.049233°N 118.260902°W
- Address: 735 South Figueroa Street; Los Angeles, California; 90017
- Opened: 1986
- Manager: JH Real Estate Partners Inc.
- Owner: JH Real Estate Partners Inc.
- Architect: Jon Jerde
- Num. of stores: 35 (as of 2018)
- Num. of anchor tenants: 1
- Floor area: 330,000 sq ft (31,000 m^{2})
- Floors: 3
- Public transit: 7th St/Metro Center
- Website: figat7th.com

FIGat7th is an open-air shopping mall located in the Financial District of the downtown core of Los Angeles, California, United States. It is nestled between three skyscrapers, 777 Tower, Ernst & Young Plaza and the residential tower, The Beaudry. Some of its current retailers include Target, Starbucks Coffee, Morton's Steakhouse, Victoria's Secret, and California Pizza Kitchen. There are also weekly and monthly events hosted by the mall, such as a farmer's market and art exhibitions.

The mall primarily catered to office workers in Downtown Los Angeles. With the rapid growth of the area's population, however, the mall has started to reposition itself to better serve the needs of the residential community.

== History ==
The mall opened on April 9, 1986, as Seventh Market Place, part of the new Citicorp Plaza development. The adjacent Citicorp Center office tower had opened the previous October. The mall's anchor stores were Bullock's and May Company. Both had closed their nearby standalone anchor stores to move to the new mall.

Bullocks closed in 1996. The May Company became Robinsons-May in 1993, then Macy's in 2006. It closed in 2009. The mall was renamed 7+Fig in 2000.

In late 2010, Target announced a CityTarget store would open as part of a redesign of the mall by the Gensler architecture firm. The mall is owned by Brookfield Properties. The mall reopened, following extensive renovations, as FIGat7th in Fall 2012. In 2016, Sport Chalet closed due to bankruptcy. It was replaced by Nordstrom Rack in fall 2017.

Brookfield sold FIGat7th to JH Real Estate Partners in May 2026 for around $60-$68 million dollars.

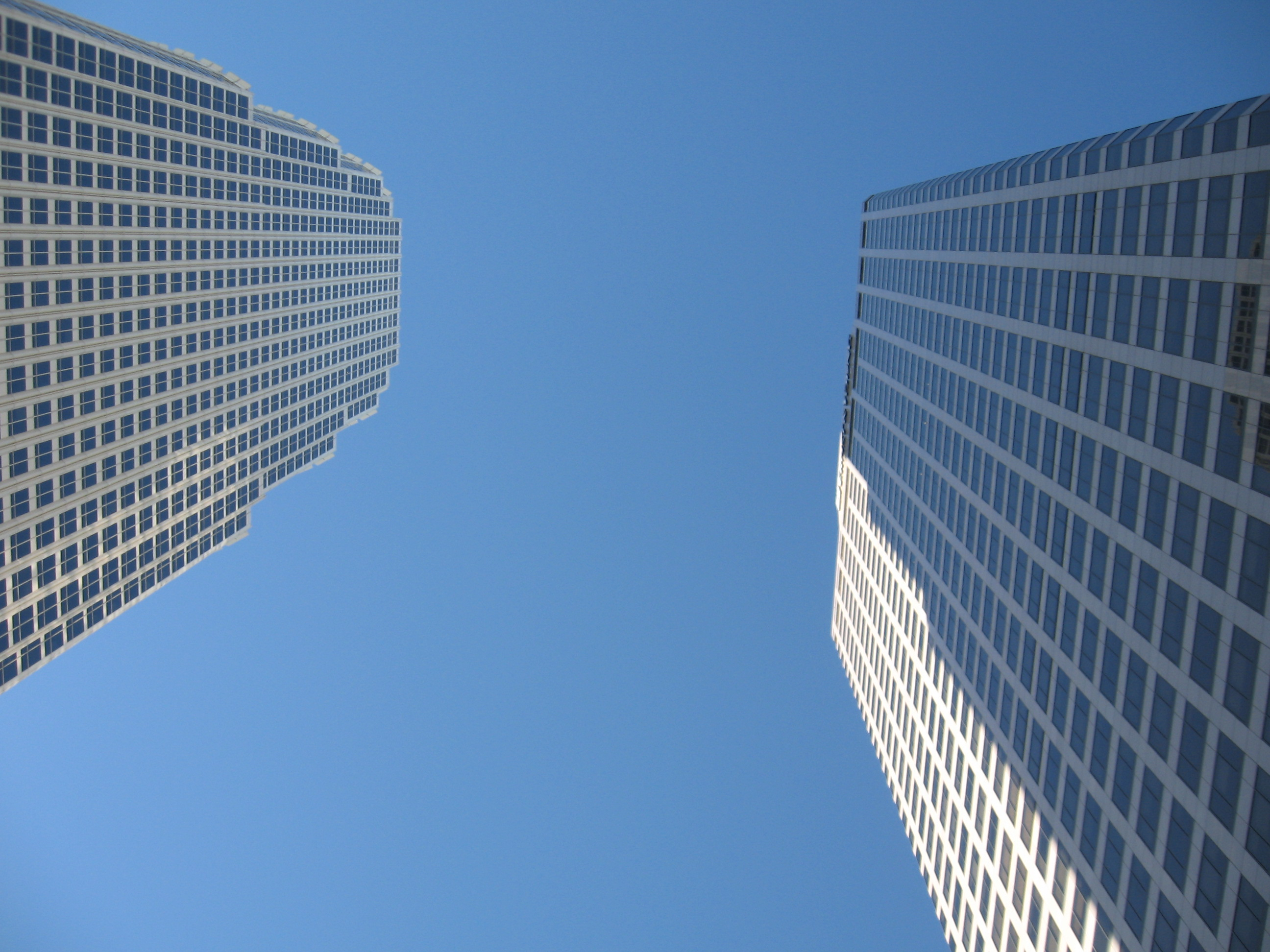
Looking up to the 777 Tower (left) and Ernst and Young Plaza (right) from the lower level of 7th+Fig Plaza

== See also ==
- The Bloc Los Angeles
