= Jessamyn Rodriguez =

Canadian-American social entrepreneur

Jessamyn Waldman Rodriguez
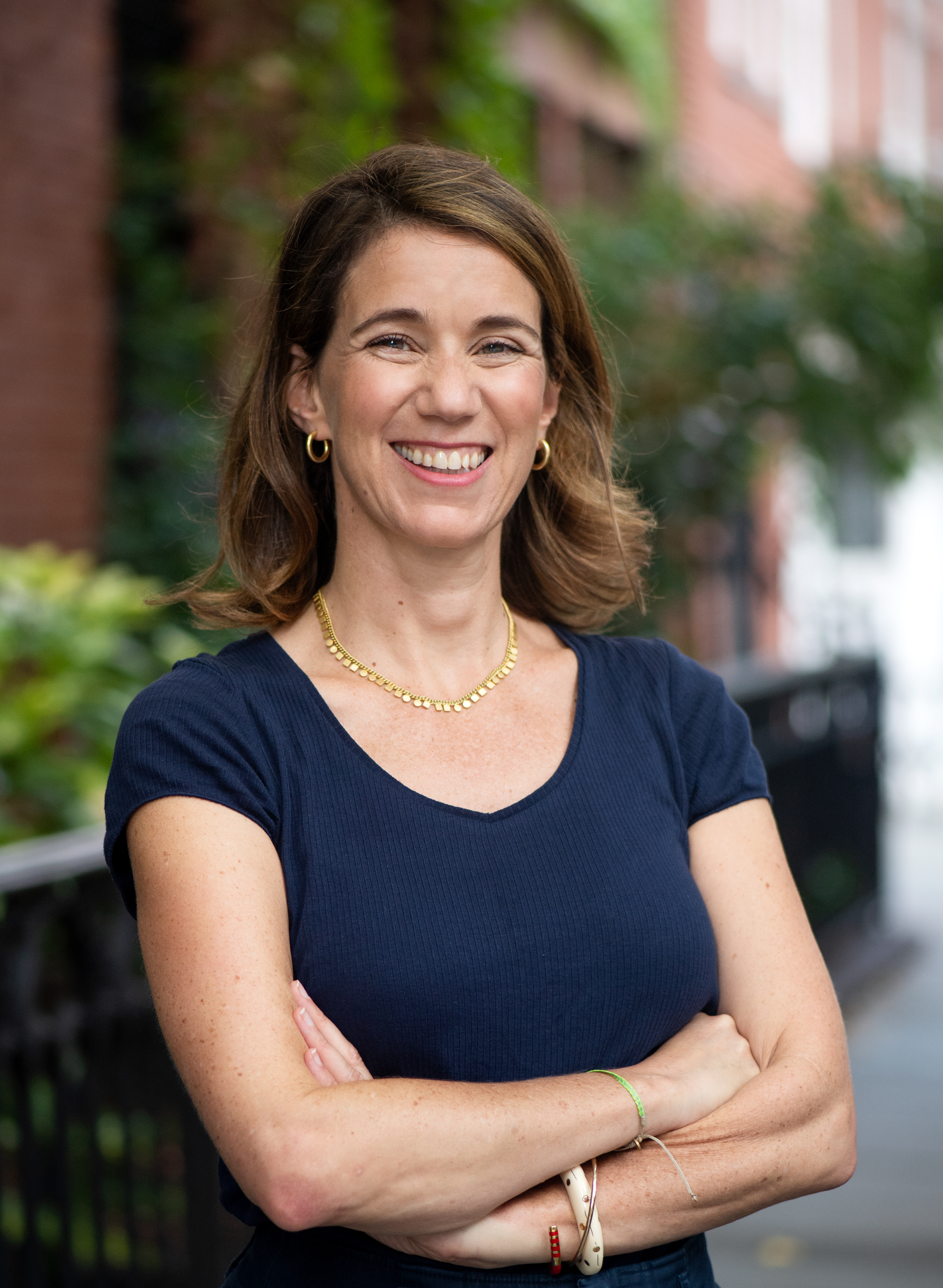
- Jessamyn Waldman Rodriguez
- Born: Jessamyn Waldman; Kingston, Ontario, Canada
- Education: B.A., Latin American Studies and Fine Arts, University of British Columbia; M.P.A., Columbia University
- Occupations: Managing Director, Research and Development
- Organization: Jim Joseph Foundation
- Spouse: Eli Rodriguez
- Children: 2

Jessamyn Waldman Rodriguez is an American social entrepreneur, educator, and hospitality executive. She is the managing director of the Jim Joseph Foundation, an organization dedicated to advancing Jewish education across North America.

== Early life and education ==
Jessamyn Waldman was born in Kingston, Ontario, and raised in Toronto. Her parents were teachers, and her great-grandfather was an immigrant from Russia. She spent her childhood in rural Ontario, where it was hard to find challah for Sabbath dinner, so her mother would braid their own.

She studied Latin American Studies and Fine Arts at the University of British Columbia, where she spent a year abroad in Santiago, Chile, and worked on an international development project, teaching human rights and health education in Guatemala. She earned a degree in public administration from Columbia University, specializing in immigration policy and human rights, in 2004.

== Career ==
Waldman Rodriguez began her career in public service as the Youth Landmine Ambassador for the Canadian Department of Foreign Affairs. She then took her first of many positions at the United Nations with the United Nations Development Program before becoming a researcher in the Population Division of its Department of Economic and Social Affairs. Her work with the UN brought her to various locations, including Costa Rica, Mexico City, and New York, where she completed her Master of Public Administration. She later transitioned to education, working as a teacher at a bilingual elementary school in Sunset Park, Brooklyn. In 2005, she was appointed Director of Human Rights Programming for the School for Human Rights in Brooklyn, where she combined her education and human rights expertise.

=== Hot Bread Kitchen ===
In 2000, Waldman Rodriguez applied for a job at the microfinance organization Women's World Banking. A friend misheard this as "Women's World Baking", which led her to a career based around breadmaking. She earned her Master Baker Certificate from The New School before apprenticing in the bread kitchen of Daniel, where she was the restaurant's first female bread baker and worked there for two years.

In 2007, she founded Hot Bread Kitchen, a non-profit social enterprise teaching immigrant and low-income minority women the necessary skills to bake and succeed in the culinary and hospitality industries. Calling food "the highest vestige of culture" and bread "so evocative that one bite can transport you back to another place and time," Waldman Rodriguez founded Hot Bread Kitchen as a place for women to train and work to find better jobs and improve their families' financial situations.

Dubbed "The United Nations of Bread", Hot Bread Kitchen leaned on the cultural background of its trainees to bake many types of bread - including Moroccan msemen, Persian nan-e barbari, and Jewish challah - which were in retail outlets including Whole Foods. In just three short years, the operation moved from Waldman Rodriguez's home kitchen to a part-time space in the Long Island Artisan Baking Center to the city-owned La Marqueta market in East Harlem.

Under her leadership from 2007 to 2018, Hot Bread Kitchen trained 250 women from 42 different countries. Waldman Rodriguez calls its 100-hour culinary training course a "crash course in how to be a good employee and all the wraparound skills that come through experience," including classes in "English, kitchen math, bakery science, professional skills, and management." All graduates are then placed with culinary employment partners. Graduates earn an average of 70% more than they did before entering the program.

In 2015, she authored The Hot Bread Kitchen Cookbook, published by Clarkson Potter, which features recipes made at the bakery and photographs of the women at work. The book was translated into both German and Portuguese. In 2015, Yahoo! Food named it the Cookbook of the Year, and The Washington Post called it one of the ten best cookbooks of the year.

=== Hot Bread Kitchen Incubates ===
In 2010, Waldman Rodriguez opened HBK Incubates, a small-business incubator assisting entrepreneurs in opening culinary start-ups. In her eight years spearheading the venture, it incubated and helped launch 172 businesses.

In 2022, HBK Incubates held its first PROOF Pitch Showcase, where five food entrepreneurs pitched their businesses to a panel of culinary experts, including Top Chef judge Gail Simmons. The inaugural PROOF Best in Show award went to 2 Girls & A Cookshop, a mother-daughter-operated business that sells Jamaican tacos and street food.

=== Daily Provisions ===
Beginning in 2018, Waldman Rodriguez joined Daily Provisions, a chain of upscale, all-day cafes from Danny Meyer's Union Square Hospitality Group. As managing director, she grew the brand into a multi-unit chain. Under her leadership, Daily Provisions launched a dine-away category (delivery, catering, and pick-up), allowing the business to remain open during the COVID-19 pandemic.

=== Jim Joseph Foundation ===
Waldman Rodriguez joined Jim Joseph Foundation in September 2022 as Managing Director. She is responsible for developing initiatives that foster education, community-building, and innovation in support of the constantly evolving Jewish community in North America. Founded in 2006, the Foundation supports Jewish education of youth and young adults in the United States.

== Honors and awards ==
Waldman Rodriguez is the recipient of several awards and accolades, including the Neighborhood Achievement Award from Mayor Michael Bloomberg, the Clinton Foundation's Global Citizen Award, and the New York Women's Foundation's Celebrating Women Award. She has appeared on multiple industry lists, including Crain's "40 Under 40", Food & Wine's "Most Innovative Women", and InStyle Magazine's "50 Badass Women". In 2015, she placed 18th on Fortune magazine's list of the 20 Most Innovative Women in Food and Drink.

She sits on the PS144 School Leadership Team and the boards of The Museum of Food and Drink and The James Beard Foundation Awards Advisory Committee. She advises small businesses, including Everytable and StealthCo Undies, a pre-revenue children's apparel company.

== Personal life ==
She and her husband, former Sotheby's Vice President and wine expert Eli Rodriguez, have two children, Dahlia and Emile.

== Bibliography ==
- The Hot Bread Kitchen Cookbook: Artisanal Baking from Around the World. Potter/TenSpeed/Harmony. 2015. ISBN 978-0804186186. (with Julia Turshen)

== Sources ==
- Eaton, Adam (2012). Secrets of the Best Chefs: Recipes, techniques, and tricks from America's greatest cooks. Artisan Books. ISBN 978-1579655297.
- Rodriguez, Jessamyn Waldman; Turshen, Julia (2015). The Hot Bread Kitchen Cookbook: Artisanal Baking from Around the World. Potter/TenSpeed/Harmony. p. 10. ISBN 978-0804186186.
