= Gas Company Tower =

52-story 749 ft class-A office skyscraper on Bunker Hill in downtown Los Angeles

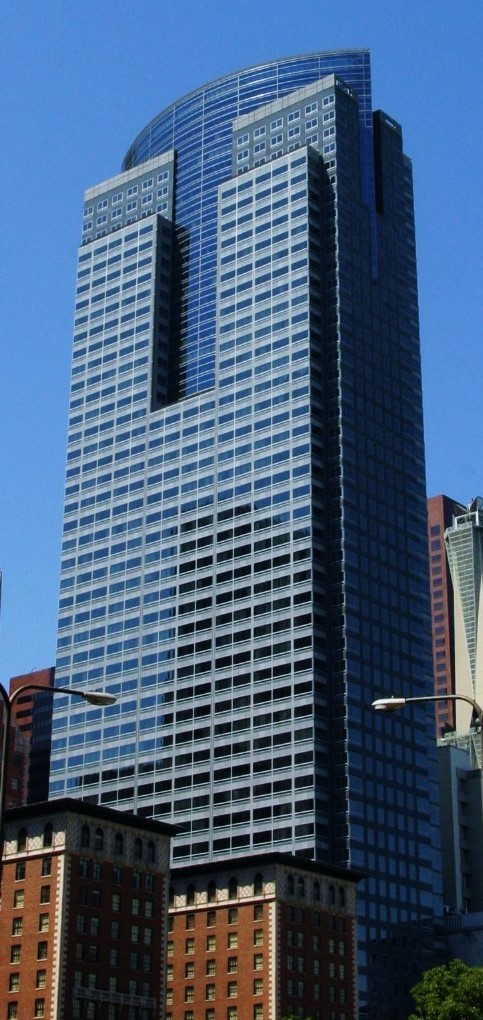
- Interactive map of the Gas Company Tower area
- Alternative names: SoCal Gas Center/Sempra Energy

General information
- Type: Commercial offices
- Location: 555 West 5th Street; Los Angeles, California Telephone (213) 244-1200
- Coordinates: 34.05°N 118.253056°W
- Construction started: 1988
- Completed: 1991
- Owner: Brookfield Properties Inc.

Height
- Roof: 749 ft (228.3 m)

Technical details
- Floor count: 52
- Floor area: 1,313,360 sq ft (122,015 m^{2})
- Lifts/elevators: 28

Design and construction
- Architects: Richard Keating; Skidmore, Owings and Merrill
- Developer: Thomas Properties Group; Maguire Properties
- Main contractor: Turner Construction

Gas Company Tower is a 52-story, 749 ft (228.3 m) class-A office skyscraper on Bunker Hill in downtown Los Angeles, California, United States. Located on the north side of Fifth Street between Grand Avenue and Olive Street, across from the Biltmore Hotel, the building serves as the headquarters for the Southern California Gas Company, which vacated its previous offices on Eighth- and Flower-streets in 1991. The building houses employees of Los Angeles County.

In 2014, Deloitte became the first tenant to have their logo affixed to the peak of the building which had been left plain since the building was completed. This giant accounting firm moved from nearby Two California Plaza, where it had been since 2000.

The tower's owner, Brookfield, defaulted on Gas Company Tower and the 777 Tower, also in Los Angeles, in 2023. The County of Los Angeles notified the court-appointed representative of their interest in acquiring the building in mid-2024. The purchase was completed late in the year. Employees were working in the building by 2025.

== In popular culture ==
The lobby is featured in the opening scene of the 1994 action movie Speed.

It was also featured in the 2001 film Vanilla Sky.

== See also ==
- List of tallest buildings in Los Angeles
- List of tallest buildings in the United States
