= Rick's Picks =

American food manufacturer

- Company type: Private
- Industry: Food processing
- Founded: 2004 in Brooklyn, New York, US
- Founders: Rick Field; Lauren McGrath
- Headquarters: Brooklyn, New York, US
- Area served: US
- Key people: Rick Field (CEO)
- Products: Pickles
- Website: rickspicks.com

Rick's Picks is an American manufacturer of pickles. It was co-founded in 2004 by CEO Rick Field and Lauren McGrath, a former caterer. It is based in Brooklyn, New York.

== History ==
After he was laid off from his job as a television producer, co-founder Rick Field turned his hobby of pickling into a business. Field had previously competed in the Rosendale International Pickle Festival in Rosendale, New York, where he had won ten ribbons by 2005. At first, Field marketed the pickles in New York City and via his website; eventually, they spread to specialty shops throughout the country. In 2007, the pickles were sold in 35 states. Writing of his experiences as an entrepreneur for Bloomberg Business, Field said that he was able to use his previous career in show business to good effect as an entrepreneur when he needed to collaborate or seek help from friends.

Following the Jumpstart Our Business Startups Act, Field began soliciting for investors on his company's website, which he said led to triple the traffic to his profile on the crowdfunding site CircleUp. The goal was a $1.38 million investment to for inventory and product expansion.

== Products ==
Field started with family recipes and then experimented to find new flavors. The pickles are artisanal, hand-processed instead of going through an industrial process. Due to pricing concerns, a new product was developed, the People's Pickle, to specifically offer a lower-priced alternative.
