= MCI Center (Los Angeles) =

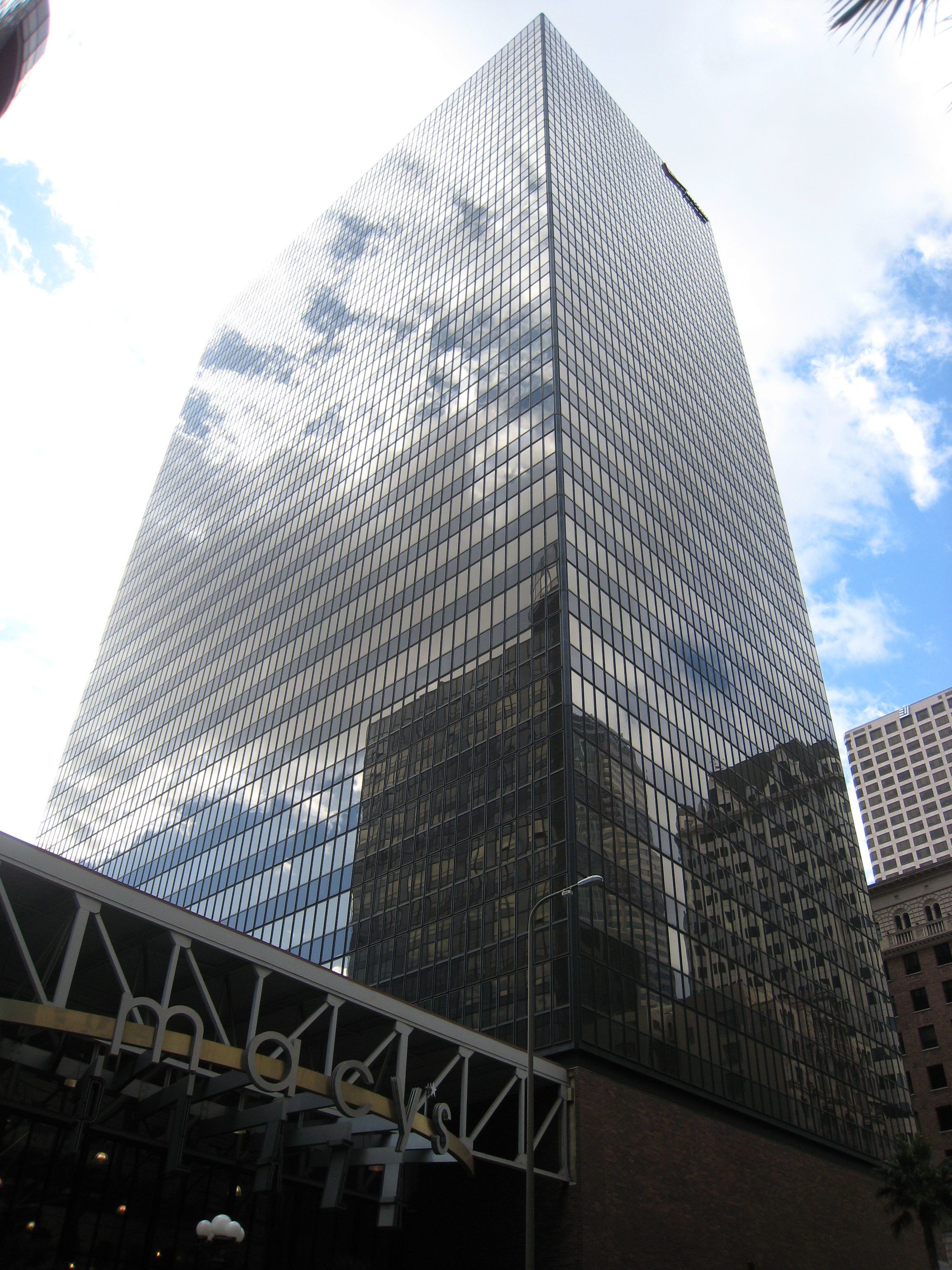
- Interactive map of the MCI Center area
- Alternative names: Broadway Plaza; Macy's Plaza

General information
- Status: Completed
- Type: Commercial offices
- Architectural style: International style
- Location: 700 South Flower Street; Los Angeles, California, USA
- Coordinates: 34.048449°N 118.258781°W
- Completed: 1973
- Owner: Ratkovich Co.

Height
- Roof: 126.3 m (414 ft)

Technical details
- Floor count: 33
- Floor area: 63,032 m^{2} (678,470 sq ft)

Design and construction
- Architect: The Luckman Partnership

MCI Center is a 126.3 m (414 ft) skyscraper in downtown Los Angeles, California, United States. It was completed in November, 1973 and has 33 floors. It is 52nd tallest building in Los Angeles.

The MCI Center is a Class A building, with 63,032 m^{2} (678,470 sq ft) of office space with a glass atrium and courtyard. On March 21, 2005 Jamison Properties bought the building for $150 per square foot totaling $101,770,500. This purchase included 925 West Eighth Street (originally known as the "Broadway Plaza" which became known as Macy's Plaza) and the 3,000 space parking garage. In 2013, the Ratkovich Company acquired the property, and after a redesign by Johnson Fain Architects, renamed the plaza “The Bloc.” Originally known for the fortress-like facade, the ground level was opened up and made more pedestrian friendly by removing the original brick walls and the glass atrium. The redevelopment features a below grade open public plaza that directly connects to the 7th Street / Metro Center Station. This is the first direct underground connection of a private development to a subway station on Metro's system.

Metrolink at one time had its headquarters in the MCI Center. By 2000, Metrolink had expanded its lease in the MCI Center by 6,700 square feet (620 m^{2}), giving the agency a total of around 40,000 square feet (3,700 m^{2}) of space. In June 2011, Metrolink moved its headquarters to the Los Angeles County Metropolitan Transportation Authority (LACMTA) headquarters at 1 Gateway Plaza at Los Angeles Union Station.

The offices of La Opinión are in Suites 3000 and 3100, while ImpreMedia Digital has its offices in Suite 3000.

== In popular culture ==
Interiors were prominently featured in the 1974 disaster film, Earthquake as the fictional "Wilson Plaza", a field hospital set up after a major earthquake destroys Los Angeles. Filming was done over two nights in March, 1974, and centered mainly around the lower level atrium plaza area, and the escalators on the Sheraton Hotel entrance to the building.

Used for many other film and television productions as well, including The Rockford Files, Rollercoaster, and Marathon Man.

== See also ==
- List of tallest buildings in Los Angeles
