= EY Plaza =

534-foot tall skyscraper in Los Angeles, California

Coordinates: 34.0492°N 118.2611°W

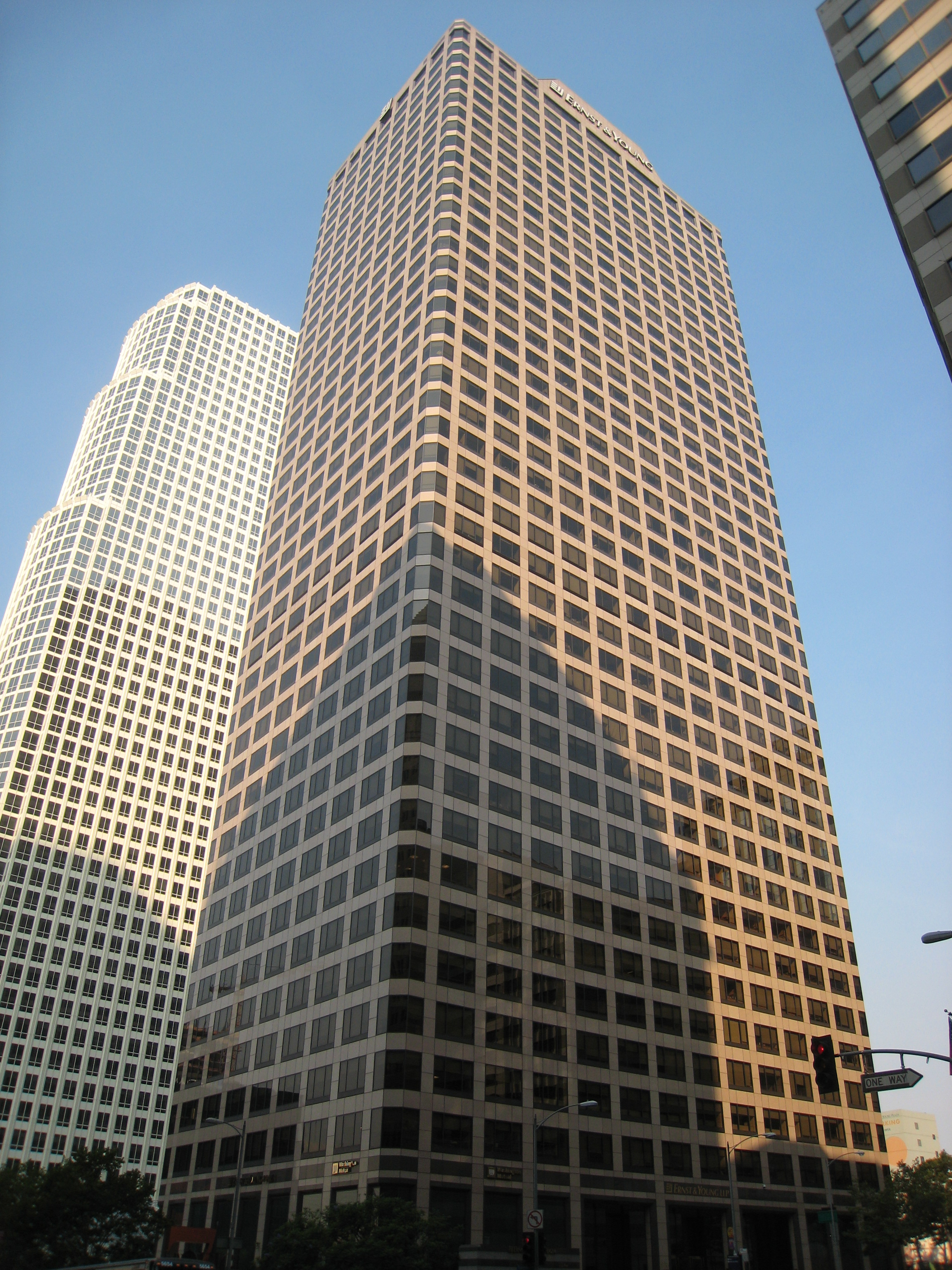
- EY Plaza
- Interactive map of the EY Plaza area

General information
- Type: Office
- Location: 725 South Figueroa Street, Los Angeles, California, United States
- Construction started: 1982
- Completed: 1985
- Opening: 1985
- Owner: Brookfield Properties
- Management: Colliers International

Height
- Roof: 534 ft (163 m)

Technical details
- Floor count: 41
- Floor area: 943,000 sq ft (87,600 m^{2})
- Lifts/elevators: 20

Design and construction
- Architect: Skidmore, Owings & Merrill
- Structural engineer: Skidmore, Owings & Merrill
- Main contractor: PCL Construction

EY Plaza, formerly known as Ernst & Young Plaza, is a 534-foot (163 m) tall skyscraper in Los Angeles, California. It was completed in 1985, has 41 floors and is the 18th tallest building in Los Angeles. The tower is currently owned by Brookfield Properties and was designed by Skidmore, Owings & Merrill. Even though it is in California, this building was placed in the New York skyline in the movie The Day After Tomorrow.

Upon completion in October 1985 as Citcorp Center, it was financial giant Citicorp's California headquarters and the anchor of the Citicorp Plaza development, also including the Seventh Market Place mall.

== Tenants ==
- Previously Trizec Properties had its Los Angeles offices in Suite 1850 EY is the naming rights tenant.

== See also ==
- List of tallest buildings in Los Angeles
