= Everytable =

American meal store chain

- Type: Public benefit corporation (PBC)
- Founded: 2016; 10 years ago
- Founders: Sam Polk, David Foster
- Headquarters: City of Industry, California, US
- Website: everytable.com

Everytable is an American public benefit corporation and healthy meal store chain that offers meals with pricing scaled to the income level of the neighborhoods it serves. Founded in 2016 by Sam Polk and David Foster, the company opened its first location in South Los Angeles before expanding across California. In 2018, Polk and Foster appeared on the business television series Shark Tank, securing US$1 million in investment. Everytable manages its own supply chain, sourcing ingredients directly from farms, preparing meals in centralized kitchens, and distributing them through a company-owned delivery fleet.

== History ==
Everytable was founded by Sam Polk and David Foster in 2016. Polk had previously worked on Wall Street as a hedge fund trader and Foster as a private equity executive, before Polk became disenchanted with Wall Street following the 2008 financial crisis and departed that industry in February 2010.

Polk's interest in food accessibility began in 2013 when he watched the documentaries Forks Over Knives and A Place at the Table, both of which examined hunger and the rise of diet-related illness in the United States among communities with limited access to fresh food. The following year, he founded Groceryships, (Note: Groceryships was renamed in 2018 to FEAST (Food, Education, Access, Support, Together).) an initiative focused on educating low-income communities in food deserts on healthier eating. Foster initially joined as a volunteer before becoming a full-time collaborator. Polk and Foster ultimately concluded that education alone was insufficient and founded Everytable to improve food accessibility through affordable, pre-made healthy meals.

The company opened its first location in South Los Angeles in July 2016. During the onset of the COVID-19 pandemic in early 2020, Everytable shifted temporarily into emergency relief, expanding rapidly through subscriptions and partnerships with the government of Los Angeles and other local institutions to provide meals to vulnerable populations, including senior citizens, people experiencing homelessness, and college students in need. The company scaled production from 30,000 to 180,000 meals per week during this period, selling 5.2 million meals and growing annual revenue from $6 million to $36 million, despite closing five of its ten Los Angeles locations due to pandemic restrictions.

That same year, Everytable launched its social franchising program with grants and investments from philanthropic foundations, sourcing franchise candidates from the underserved communities it served. Building on this, the company launched Everytable University in 2021, a training program to help entrepreneurs from those communities start and operate their own franchises. By 2025, Everytable had established partnerships with multiple Southern California school districts and relocated its headquarters to the City of Industry, California. (Note: Everytable was previously headquartered in Vernon, California.) In 2026, the company formalized an agreement with the city of Phoenix, Arizona to supply its senior citizen food program, and expanded franchising opportunities to traditional investors bringing outside capital and experience. As of 2026, the company operates more than 35 locations across California.

=== Funding ===
Between 2016 and 2018, Everytable raised $2.1 million in a bridge round followed by $5 million in Series A funding. In 2018, Polk and Foster appeared on season 9 (episode 21) of the business reality television series Shark Tank, with investor Rohan Oza agreeing to invest US$1 million for a 10% stake in the company. That same year, the company launched a crowdfunding campaign on Republic, securing over $290,000 from 849 investors, and raised an additional $5.3 million from multiple investors including the Toms Social Entrepreneurship Fund, established by Toms Shoes founder Blake Mycoskie; Kimball Musk, the younger brother of businessman Elon Musk; social impact investment group Acumen; actress Gwyneth Paltrow; and former First Lady of California Maria Shriver.

In 2020, Everytable received $4.5 million in grants and investments from the W.K. Kellogg Foundation, the Annenberg Foundation, Dignity Health, and the California Wellness Foundation. That November, the company raised $16 million in a Series B funding round led by Creadev, a French investment firm, alongside Kaiser Permanente Ventures, Candide Group, Gratitude Railroad Ventures, Desert Bloom Food Ventures, and returning investor Kimball Musk, with the funding earmarked for expansion across Southern California and into other parts of the country.

In August 2022, Everytable closed a $55 million Series C round led by Creadev, Desert Bloom Food Ventures, and Gullspång Re:food, bringing total funding since its founding to $87 million. The following year, in July 2023, the company received an additional $25 million from the Dohmen Co. Foundation as part of a Series C-2 round, with the foundation citing Everytable's mission to improve food access in underserved communities as the basis for its investment.

== Business model ==
Everytable operates grab-and-go food stores with prices scaled to the income level of each location's surrounding area, with the aim of offering affordable and healthy meals to the local community while remaining competitive against alternatives such as fast food restaurants. Pricing is calculated using per capita income data by zip code, which Everytable uses to determine the median household income of each area, with each location designed to be individually profitable under this variable pricing model. The company also offers a subscription plan for customers in the area and a pay-it-forward program through which customers can purchase meals in advance for others who may not be able to afford them.

Meals are prepared off-site at centralized kitchens rather than in-store, reducing labor and operating costs while enabling larger-scale food preparation than traditional restaurant or fast food facilities allow. The company manages its own delivery fleet of refrigerated vehicles to supply each location rather than outsourcing distribution, and sources ingredients directly from farms to prioritize high-quality produce. At each location, customers can heat and eat their meals on-site or take them to go, requiring minimal staffing at each store. Everytable also offers a food delivery program for businesses, with discounts available for larger group orders. By deliberately managing its entire supply chain to benefit from economies of scale, the company adopts a model similar to those used by large food manufacturers, fast food chains, and convenience stores. Polk has stated that this approach prioritizes scale over small-scale production as a means of driving broader change in the food industry while keeping operating costs down.

Everytable employs chefs specializing in regional cuisine at its centralized kitchens, working with local families to develop menus that reflect the dietary preferences of each area. Many of the chefs are hired locally and come from a non-profit background.

== Menu ==
Everytable's menu consists of hot meals, salads, sandwiches, wraps, soups, snacks, desserts, and drinks, with entrées featuring proteins and vegetables alongside grains such as pasta and rice. The menu includes both familiar and distinctive dish options.

The menu also accommodates a range of dietary preferences, including high protein, low sodium, low carb, keto, paleolithic, vegan, vegetarian, dairy-free, and gluten-conscious options, as well as seafood and non-seafood choices. The menu draws from multiple culinary traditions.

Everytable has collaborated with public figures on menu items. In May 2026, the company partnered with California-based rapper Lil Grifo to launch a dish called Lil Grifo's Stacked Enchilada, featuring layered tortillas with cheddar cheese, cilantro rice, red sauce, and chicken. The following month, they partnered with American actor Kel Mitchell to launch a dish called Kel Mitchell's Savory Turkey Burger, which consists of caramelized onions, aged cheddar cheese, a turkey-meat patty, and an orange-infused sauce.
