= Avenue of the Stars (Los Angeles) =

Avenue in Century City, LA

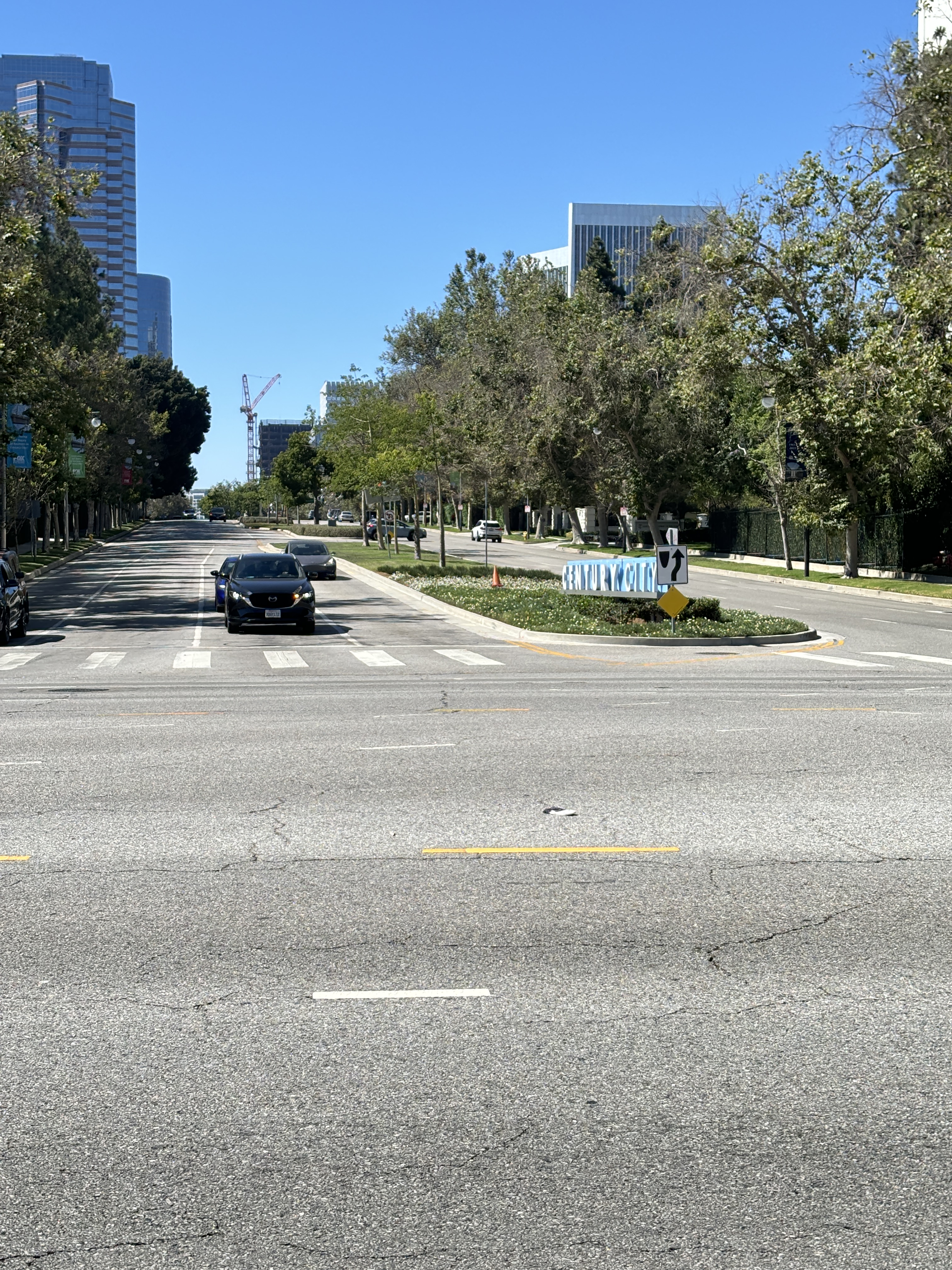
- Avenue of the Stars from Pico Boulevard
- Maintained by: Bureau of Street Services, City of Los Angeles Department of Public Works
- South end: Pico Boulevard
- North end: Santa Monica Boulevard

The Avenue of the Stars is the main thoroughfare in Century City, Los Angeles, in the southwestern part of the U.S. state of California.

== Location ==
The avenue is one of the main roads in Century City, a neighborhood of West Los Angeles. It runs from the Hillcrest Country Club at West Pico Boulevard north to the Los Angeles Country Club at Santa Monica Boulevard. It is crossed by Constellation Boulevard, West Olympic Boulevard, and two smaller streets: Galaxy Way and Empyrean Way.

== History ==
Like most of Century City, the land on which this avenue was built was originally part of a ranch owned by cowboy actor Tom Mix (1880–1960). Later, the land became the backlot of 20th Century Fox. It was later sold to Alcoa, which hired real estate developer William Zeckendorf (1905–1976) to develop Century City.

The first building on the avenue, the Gateway West Building, was designed by architect Welton Becket (1902–1969) and built in 1963. Located on the southwest corner of Santa Monica Boulevard and the Avenue of the Stars, it was demolished in 2015. The second building was the Hyatt Regency Century Plaza, designed by architect Minoru Yamasaki (1912–1986), and built from 1964 to 1966. At the same time, the Gateway East Building, on the southeast corner of Santa Monica Boulevard and the Avenue of the Stars, was completed in 1965; its exact address is 1800 Avenue of the Stars. Five years later, the 1900 Avenue of the Stars building, designed by architect Albert C. Martin, Jr. (1913–2006), was completed in 1970.

More buildings in the central section of the avenue came later. For example, the Century Plaza Towers, designed by architect Minoru Yamasaki (1912–1986), was built from 1972 to 1975. The Fox Plaza, designed by William Pereira (1909–1985), was built from 1985 to 1987. The SunAmerica Center, located at 1999 Avenue of the Stars, and designed by the architectural firm Johnson Fain, was built from 1989 to 1990. The 2000 Avenue of the Stars building was built from 2004 to 2007.

== Main offices ==
Avenue of the Stars, 1978

The high-rise buildings along the avenue are home to many offices and diplomatic consulates. Some of them include:

- 1900 Avenue of the Stars, Suite 1250: Consulate-General of Italy.
- Century City Center, 1950 Avenue of the Stars (under construction): Creative Artists Agency
- 1999 Avenue of the Stars: Univision Communications.
- 2000 Avenue of the Stars: Annenberg Foundation.
