= One California =

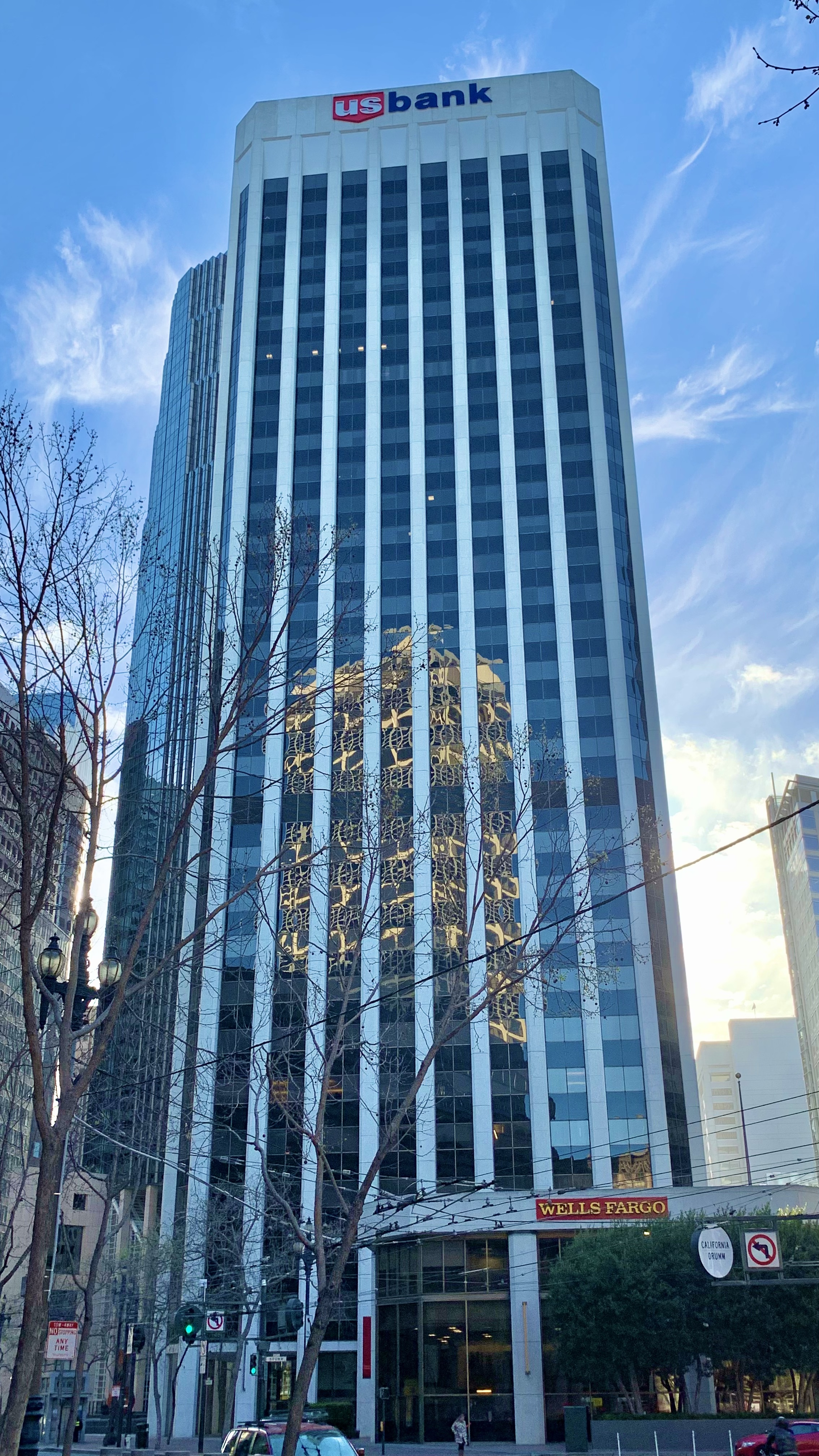
- In 2021

- Location within San Francisco One California (California) One California (the United States)
- Alternative names: Airtouch Building; Mutual Benefit Life Building

General information
- Type: Commercial offices
- Location: One California Street; San Francisco, California
- Coordinates: 37.7932°N 122.3972°W
- Completed: 1969
- Owner: One California Street Partners
- Operator: CBRE Group

Height
- Roof: 133.5 m (438 ft)

Technical details
- Floor count: 32
- Floor area: 484,512 sq ft (45,012.6 m^{2})
- Lifts/elevators: 13

Design and construction
- Architect: Welton Becket Associates

Other information
- Parking: 135

One California is a 133.5 m (438 ft), 32-story office skyscraper completed in 1969 in the Financial District of San Francisco, California. It is the 31st-tallest building in the city. The architect of the building was Welton Becket Associates.

== History ==
The building was constructed on the site of the previously demolished Fife Building (1 Drumm Street) and was one of the earliest modern skyscrapers constructed in the city. It was the fifth tallest building in San Francisco when it was completed but is no longer in the top 30. One California was one of three buildings, the other two being 555 California Street and McKesson Plaza, that was featured in a 1970 Newsweek article that may have used the term "Manhattanization".

In 1995, Shorenstein became the sole owner of the tower and invested US$5 million in an extensive lobby and plaza renovation.

=== Corporate signage ===
One California is one of very few (Note: 425 California Street and the Bank of California Tower are other examples.) downtown office skyscrapers in San Francisco to feature corporate signage at the top of the tower. When it was constructed, the building's signage read "Mutual Benefit Life" for the insurance company. Sometime after the building went up, the San Francisco Planning Code was changed to prohibit signs above 100 feet (30 m) on new buildings. Existing buildings were grandfathered in and allowed for replacing signs as long as the new sign is no larger in surface area and projection than the existing sign.

After Mutual Benefit Life went out of business, the building's sign was changed in April 1995 to the logo for AirTouch, which had its headquarters in the building. In October 2005, the AirTouch signs were removed and replaced with the current US Bank logo.

== Tenants ==
- Alpine Investors
- Grosvenor Group
- Lennar
- Salesforce
- Perella Weinberg Partners
- Included Health

== See also ==
- List of tallest buildings in San Francisco
