= MacDonald Becket =

American architect

- Born: November 2, 1928
- Died: December 7, 2017 (aged 89); Phoenix, Arizona, U.S.
- Education: USC School of Architecture
- Occupation: Architect
- Spouse: Diane Becket
- Children: 4 sons

MacDonald George Becket (November 2, 1928 - December 7, 2017) was an American architect. He was the president, and later chairman and CEO of Welton Becket and Associates, an architectural firm in Los Angeles, California. He helped master plan Century City and restore the California State Capitol. He was made a fellow of the American Institute of Architects in 1974.
