= 1900 Avenue of the Stars =

Coordinates: 34.060570°N 118.416481°W

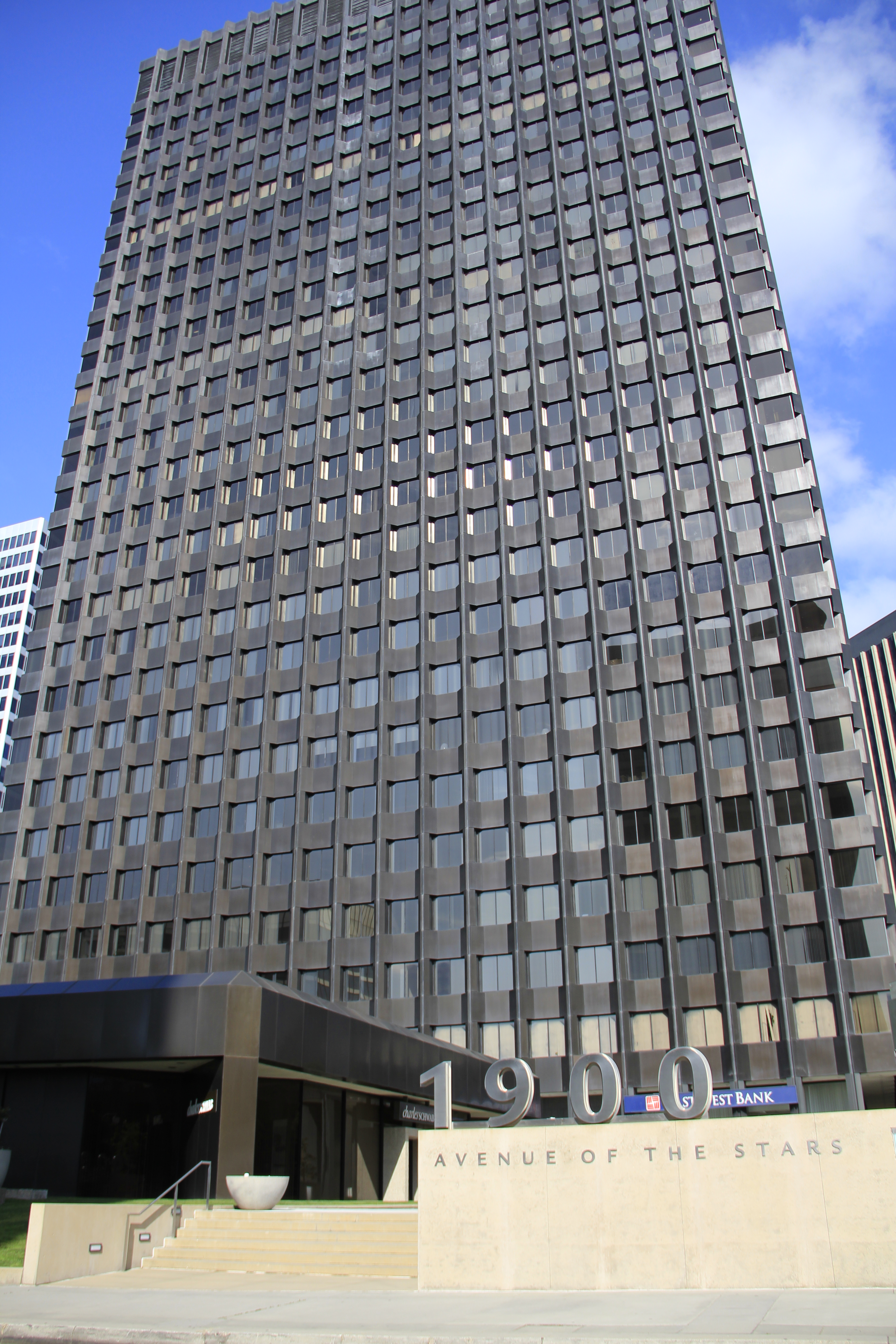
- (2012)
- Interactive map of the 1900 Avenue of the Stars area

General information
- Status: Completed
- Location: 1900 Avenue of the Stars, Century City, Los Angeles, California
- Construction started: 1969
- Completed: 1970

Technical details
- Floor count: 27

Design and construction
- Architect: Albert C. Martin, Jr.

1900 Avenue of the Stars is a high-rise office building located in Century City, Los Angeles, California.

== Location ==
The building is located at 1900 on the Avenue of the Stars in Century City in West Los Angeles.

== History ==
It was designed by renowned architect Albert C. Martin Jr. (1913–2006). Construction began in 1969 and was completed a year later, in 1970. It is 121.31 metres high, with twenty-seven floors. It is made of aluminum and tinted glass.
