= Gateway West Building =

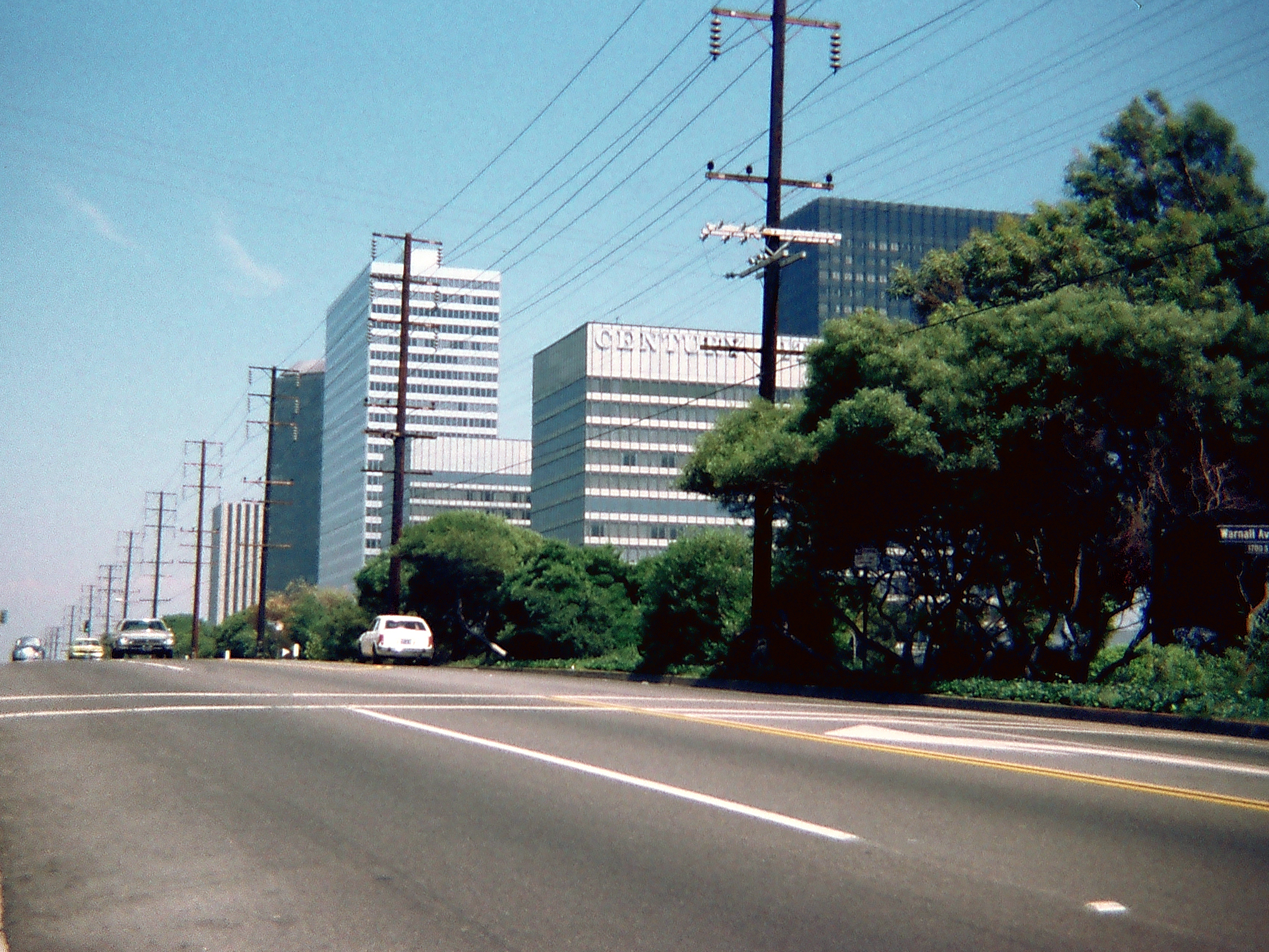
- Gateway West (with Century City neon sign) as viewed from Santa Monica Boulevard in 1978
- Interactive map of the Gateway West Building area

General information
- Status: Demolished
- Type: Office
- Architectural style: International Style
- Location: 1801 Avenue of the Stars, Century City, Los Angeles, California
- Coordinates: 34.06027°N 118.41842°W
- Construction started: December 1961
- Completed: 1963
- Demolished: 2015

Technical details
- Floor count: 13
- Floor area: 250,000 sq ft (23,000 m^{2})

Design and construction
- Architect: Welton Becket

Gateway West Building was a skyscraper in Century City, Los Angeles, California.

== Location ==
The Gateway West Building was located on the southwest corner of Santa Monica Boulevard and the Avenue of the Stars in Century City, a district in the city of Los Angeles.

== History ==
Completed in 1963, Gateway West was the first building erected in Century City—an architectural plan that converted the back lot of 20th Century Fox into a modern neighbourhood with skyscrapers. Designed in the International Style by renowned architect Welton Becket (1902–1969), it was 13 stories tall and 173.56 feet (52.90 m) high and had a façade made of aluminum.

Gateway West's twin-sister building, Gateway East, was located directly across from it on Avenue of the Stars. Gateway East, was the second high-rise building completed in the new redevelopment. Gateway West was demolished in 2015 to make way for an expansion of Westfield Century City.

== Heritage significance ==
As the first high-rise building erected in Century City, this building represented the new style of the neighbourhood.
