= General Petroleum Building =

- U.S. National Register of Historic Places
- Los Angeles Historic-Cultural Monument
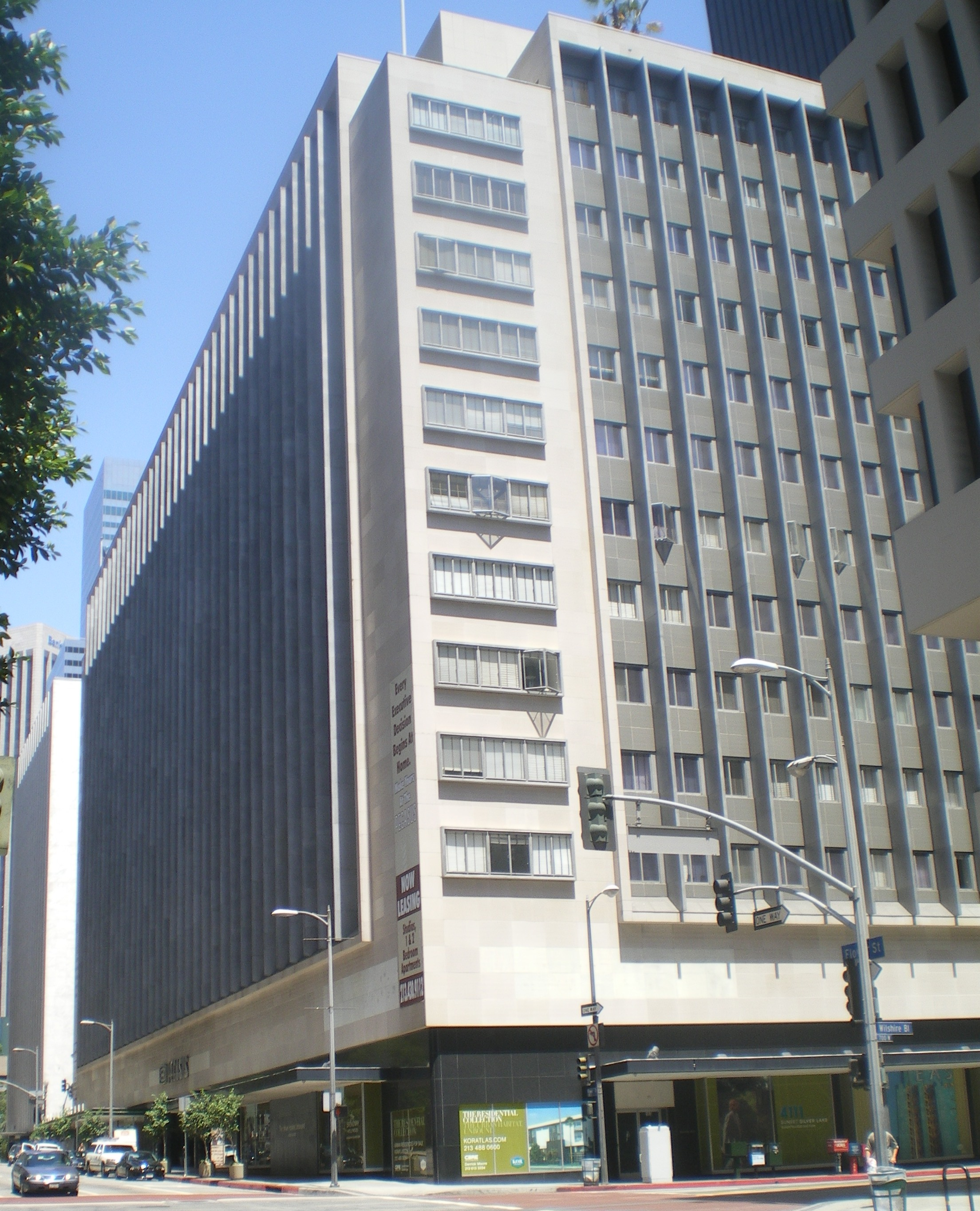
- General Petroleum Building, 2008

- Location within the Los Angeles metropolitan area Location within California Location within the United States
- Location: 612 S. Flower St., Los Angeles, California
- Coordinates: 34°2′58″N 118°15′28″W
- Built: 1947-1949
- Architect: Wurdeman and Becket
- Architectural style: Modern
- NRHP reference No.: 04000621
- LAHCM No.: 766
- Added to NRHP: June 22, 2004

The General Petroleum Building, also known as the Mobil Oil Building and the Pegasus Apartments, is a highrise building in the Modern architecture style located in Downtown Los Angeles.

== Design and construction ==
Walter Wurdeman & Welton Becket were the building's architects. P.J. Walker Co. was the general contractor, and Carl Larsen was the construction superintendent.

Groundbreaking on the 13-story building was on July 11, 1947, and the steel structure was virtually complete by December 1947. On February 27, 1948, a 31-year-old rigger, Laurence Leslie, slipped and fell to his death from scaffolding on the fourth floor.

In March 1948, while still under construction, the building was sold to the New York Life Insurance Co. with a lease back to General Petroleum Corp. The purchase price was later disclosed to have been $11,750,000.

The first offices were occupied in February 1949, and the building was dedicated on April 1, 1949 in a ceremony attended by Governor Earl Warren, Mayor Fletcher Bowron, and other dignitaries. At the time of its dedication, it had 504,000 square feet and was the largest office building in Southern California. Upon completion, the "Mobiloil" and "Mobilgas" names and flying red horse logo were displayed from the top of the building.

The development also included a six-story rectangular parking garage, also designed by Wurdeman & Becket, built two blocks south on the corner of 8th and Flower, with space for 446 cars and a spiral interior path allowing cars to drive from the first level to the higher levels. At the time, the spiral design allowing for self parking was described the Los Angeles Times as "the only one of its kind in the nation."

== Later use and designation ==
The building was vacated in 1994 and converted into 322 apartments in 2003 by developers Kennedy Wilson and the KOR Realty Group. The apartment building was, and remains, operated under the name Pegasus in tribute to the flying red horse that was displayed for decades atop the structure.

On June 22, 2004, the building was added to the National Register of Historic Places based on architectural criteria.

== See also ==
- List of Registered Historic Places in Los Angeles
- Socony-Mobil Building
