= AirTouch =

U.S. communications company

AirTouch Communications, Inc.
- Type: Public
- Traded as: NYSE: ATI
- Industry: Cellular Communications
- Predecessors: Pacific Telesis; US West
- Founded: March 5, 1994; 32 years ago
- Defunct: 2006
- Fate: Merged with Vodafone into AirTouch by Vodafone, then was merged with Bell Atlantic and GTE to form Verizon Wireless
- Successor: Verizon Wireless
- Headquarters: One California; Financial District, San Francisco, California, U.S.
- Products: Cellular Telephone Service, Paging
- Website: airtouchinc.com

AirTouch Communications, Inc. was an American wireless telephone service provider, created as a spin-off of Pacific Telesis on April 1, 1994. Its headquarters were located in the One California building in the Financial District of San Francisco, California. After a series of mergers, the company's vestiges are now part of Verizon Wireless.

== History ==
At the time of the Bell System divestiture in 1984, each Regional Bell Operating Company (Baby Bell) was given a portion of the Advanced Mobile Phone System (AMPS) network corresponding to its service area. Pacific Telesis, the Baby Bell covering California and Nevada, spun off its wireless services as AirTouch Communications in 1994.

U S West New Vector Group logo

The U S West New Vector Group was also created from AMPS. In July 1994, U S West agreed to a joint venture with AirTouch as a prelude to merging the cellular unit into AirTouch. By 1996, all accounts were operated under the AirTouch name. Due to regulatory issues, the full merger was not completed until February 1998. As part of the merger, certain overlapping areas of coverage had to be sold to other wireless providers. Many of these went to GTE Wireless.

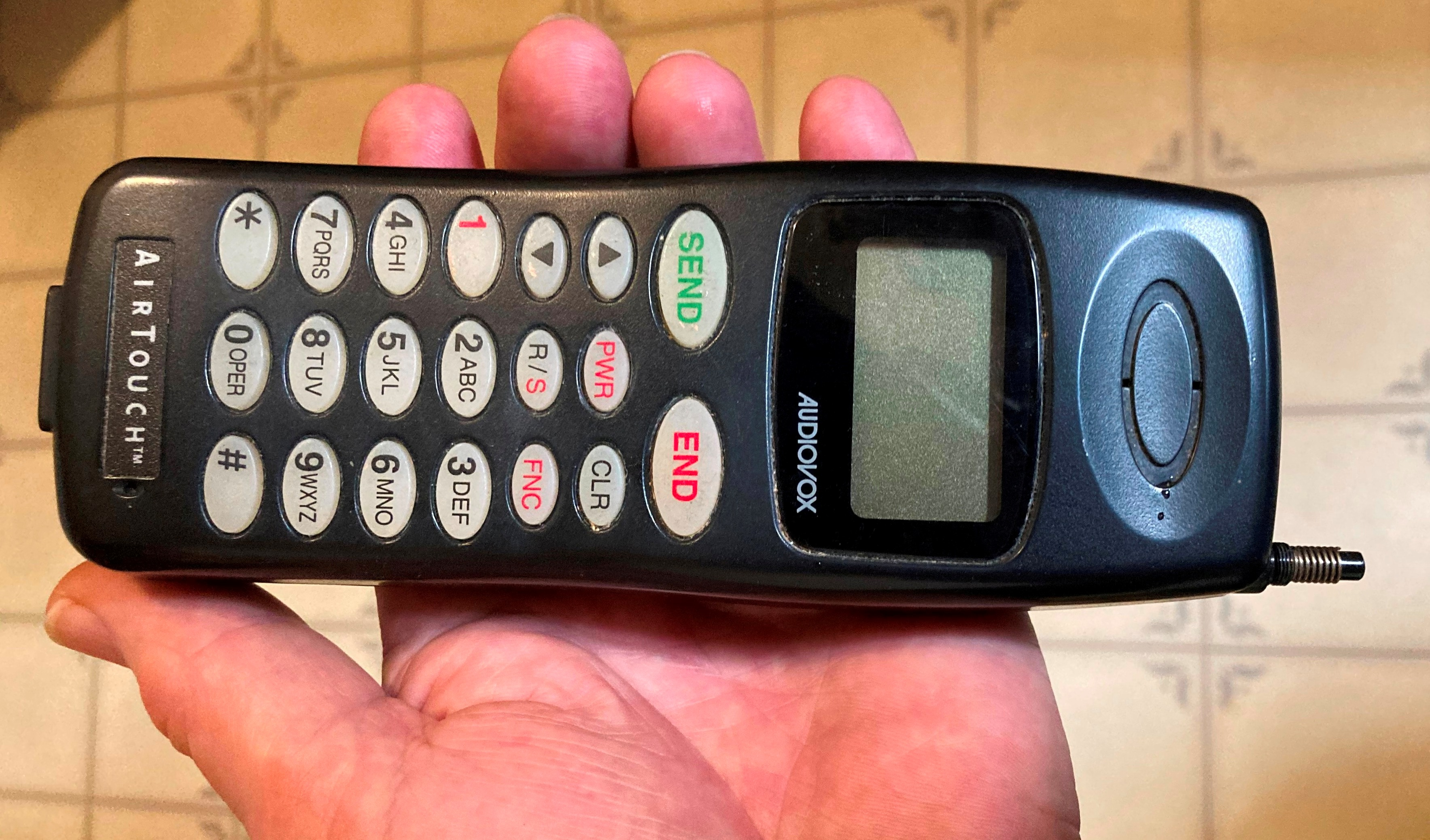
An AirTouch cellular phone from the 1990s.

On June 30, 1999, AirTouch Communications merged with UK-based Vodafone, becoming Vodafone AirTouch, after rejecting overtures from Bell Atlantic. In September 1999, Vodafone AirTouch announced a $70-billion joint venture with Bell Atlantic to be called Verizon Wireless, which would be composed of the two companies' U.S. wireless assets, Bell Atlantic Mobile (another AMPS spinoff) and AirTouch Cellular. This wireless joint venture received regulatory approval in six months, and began operations as Verizon Wireless on April 4, 2000. On June 30, 2000, the addition of GTE Wireless' assets, in connection with the merger of Bell Atlantic and GTE to form Verizon Communications, made Verizon Wireless the nation's largest wireless communications provider. For the joint venture, Verizon Communications owned 55% and Vodafone owned 45%. AirTouch Paging was re-branded as Verizon Wireless Messaging Services. In June 2006, Verizon Wireless sold the paging division to American Messaging Services. In 2014, Verizon Communications purchased the 45% owned by Vodafone, making Verizon Wireless a wholly owned subsidiary.

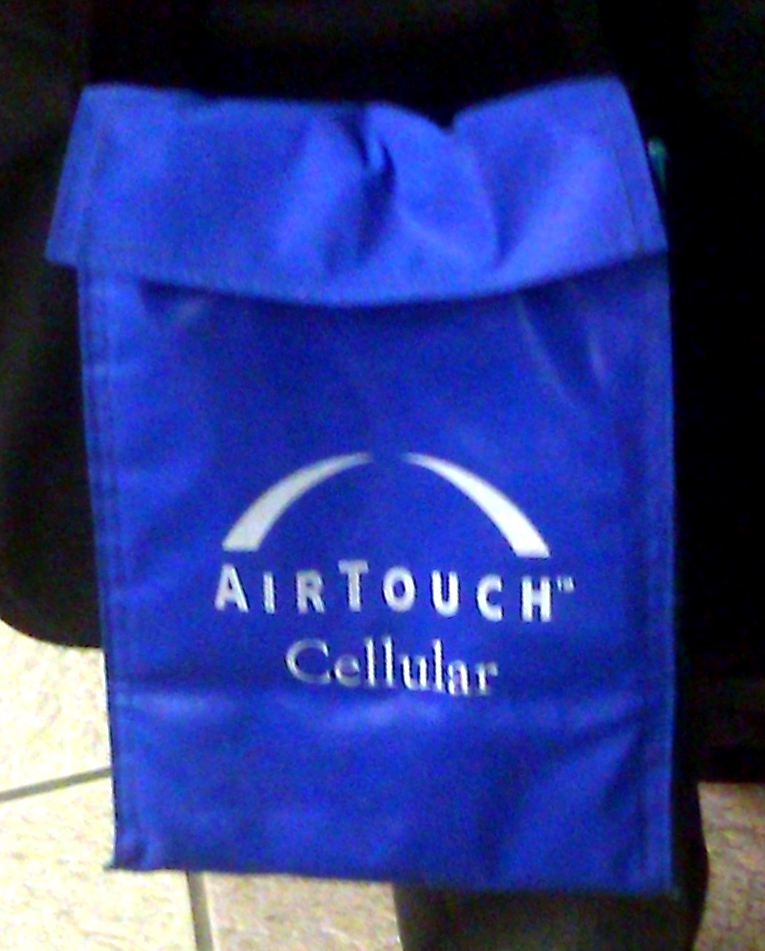
A tote bag bearing the AirTouch logo.

Verizon Wireless still maintains a call center in some of the buildings that used to house AirTouch Cellular's call center and administrative offices.
