= Welton Becket =

American architect (1902–1969)

- Becket in front of the Dorothy Chandler Pavilion in downtown Los Angeles
- Born: Welton David Becket; August 8, 1902; Seattle, Washington, US
- Died: January 16, 1969 (aged 66); Los Angeles, California, US
- Education: University of Washington
- Occupation: Architect
- Children: 2
- Practice: Welton Becket and Associates
- Buildings: Capitol Records Building; Pan-Pacific Auditorium; Beverly Hilton Hotel
- Design: Century City Master Plan

Welton David Becket (August 8, 1902 – January 16, 1969) was an American modern architect who designed many buildings in Los Angeles.

== Biography ==
Becket was born in Seattle and graduated from the University of Washington program in Architecture in 1927 with a B.Arch. degree.

He moved to Los Angeles in 1933 and formed a partnership with his University of Washington classmate Walter Wurdeman and Los Angeles architect Charles F. Plummer. Their first major commission was the Pan-Pacific Auditorium in 1935, which won them residential jobs from James Cagney, Robert Montgomery, and other film celebrities. Plummer died in 1939.

Their firm designed Bullock's Pasadena (1944) and several corporate headquarters. Wurdeman and Becket developed the concept of "total design," whereby their firm would be responsible for master planning, engineering, interiors, furniture, fixtures, landscaping, signage, and even (in the case of restaurants) menus, silverware, matchbooks, and napkins.

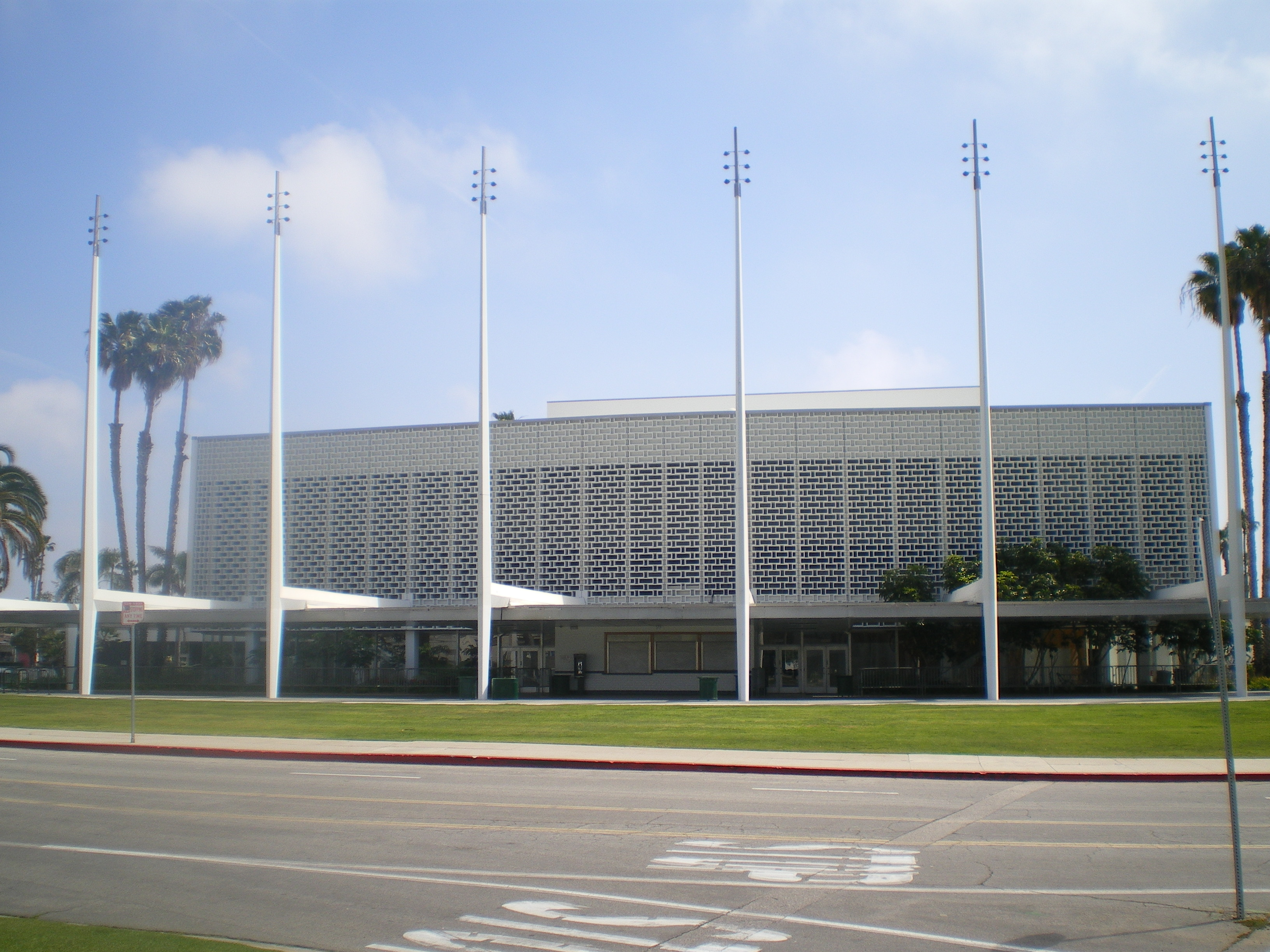
The 3,000-seat Santa Monica Civic Auditorium; the project designer was Lou Naidorf and it opened in 1958

After Wurdeman's death in 1949, Becket formed Welton Becket and Associates and continued to grow the firm to the extent that it was one of the largest architectural offices in the world by the time of his death in 1969. In 1987, his firm was acquired by Ellerbe Associates, and the merged firm continued as Ellerbe Becket until the end of 2009, when it was acquired by AECOM. It is now known as Ellerbe Becket, an AECOM Company.

Becket's buildings used unusual facade materials including ceramic tile and stainless steel grillwork, repetitive geometric patterns, and a heavy emphasis on walls clad in natural stone, particularly travertine and flagstone.

With The Walt Disney Company and the United States Steel Corporation, Becket's firm co-designed Disney's Contemporary Resort, which opened in 1971 at Walt Disney World Resort in Orlando, Florida. The Contemporary Resort was designed as a 14-story steel A-frame with a monorail running through the building. Modular guest rooms were assembled, finished, furnished, and fully equipped with their doors locked on the ground, then lifted by crane and inserted into the frame; however, it sometimes took multiple tries. Welton Becket was elected a fellow of the American Institute of Architects in 1952.

Becket's sons, Welton MacDonald Becket & Bruce Becket, are also practicing architects, as well as his nephew MacDonald G. Becket and his granddaughter Alexandra Becket.

== Commissions ==
Selected works

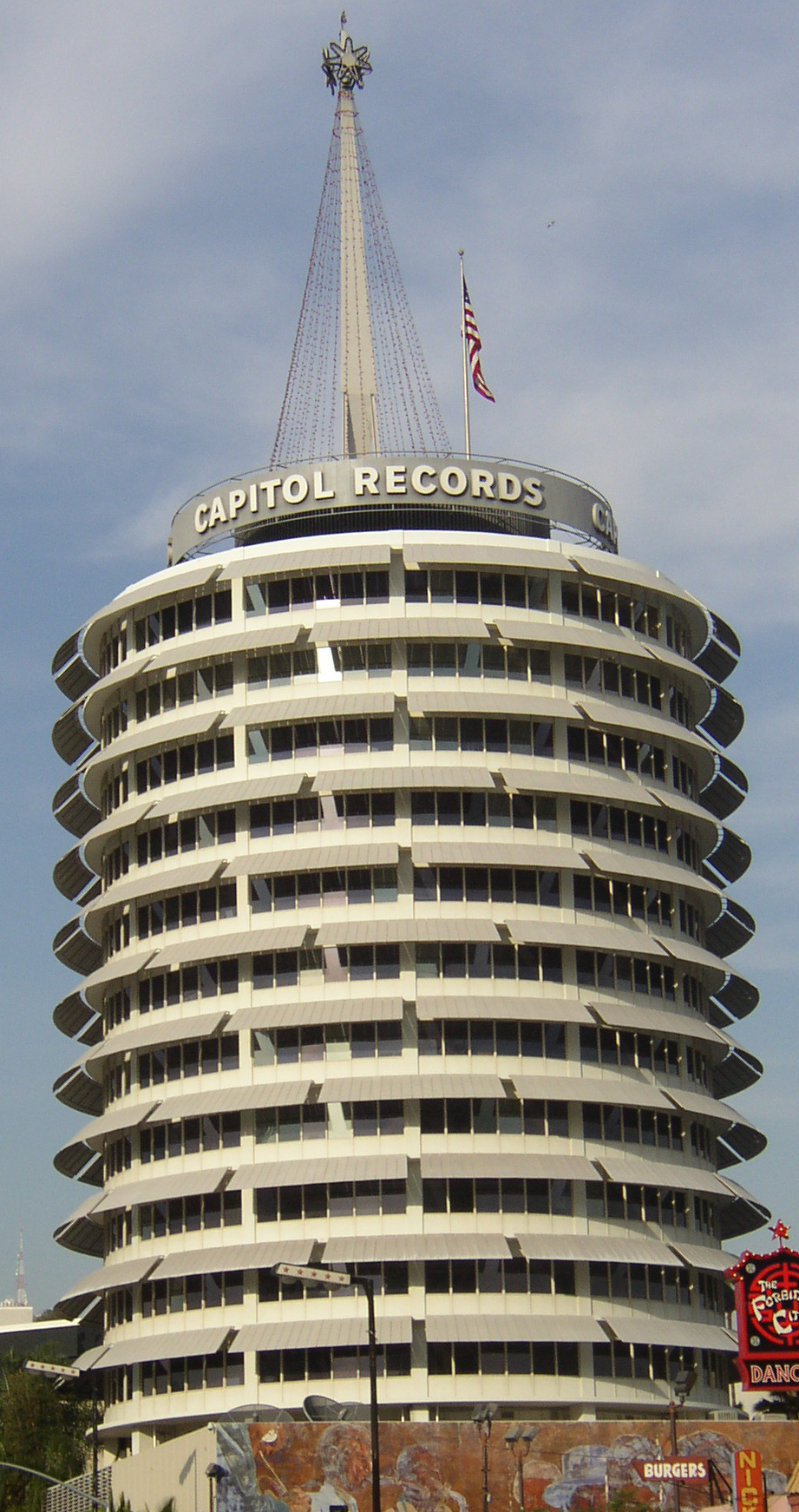
Capitol Records Building (1956)

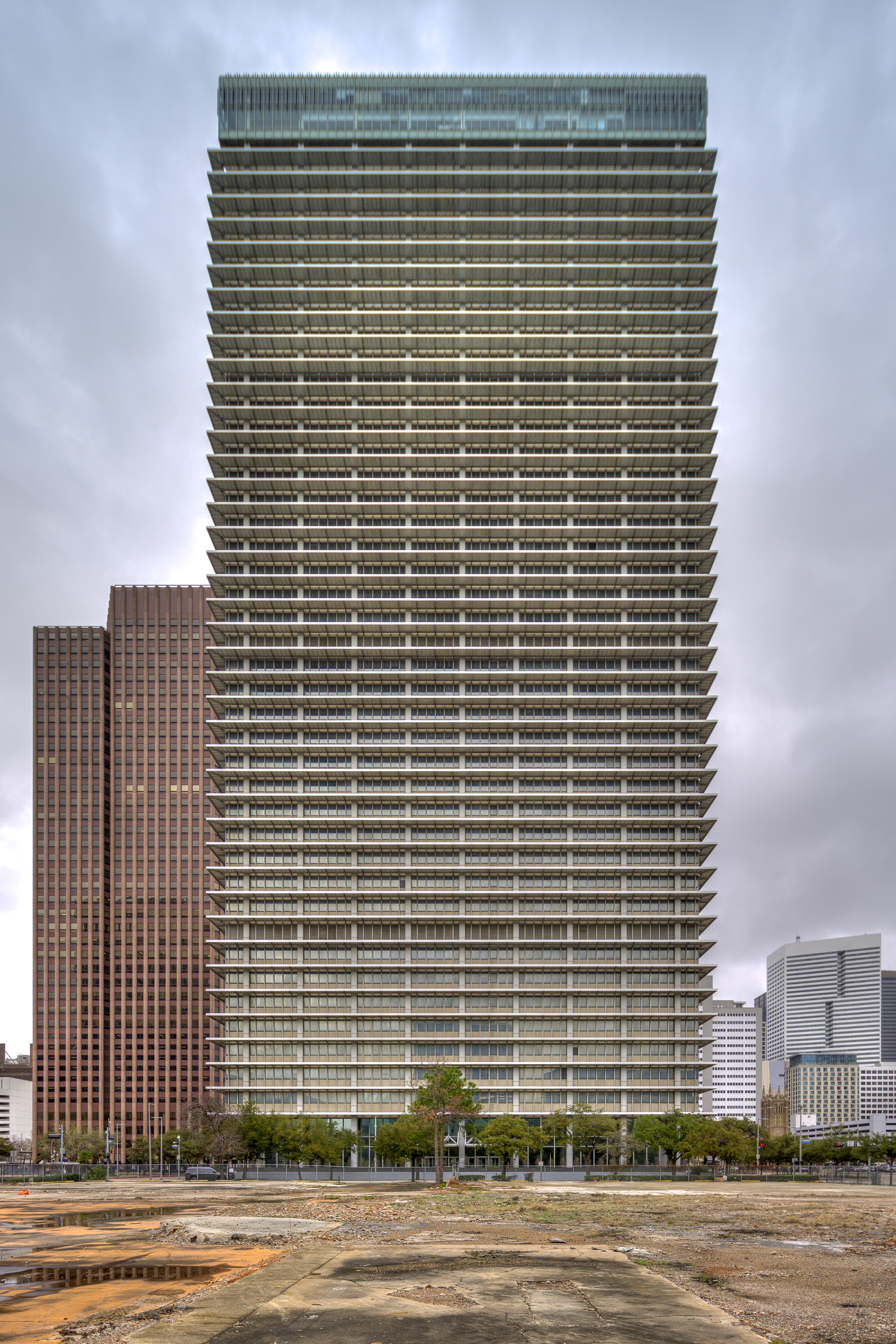
Humble Oil Headquarters (1963)

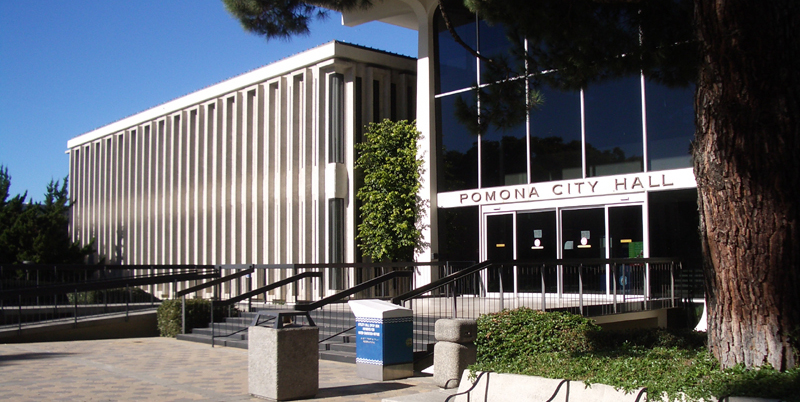
Pomona, California city hall (1969)

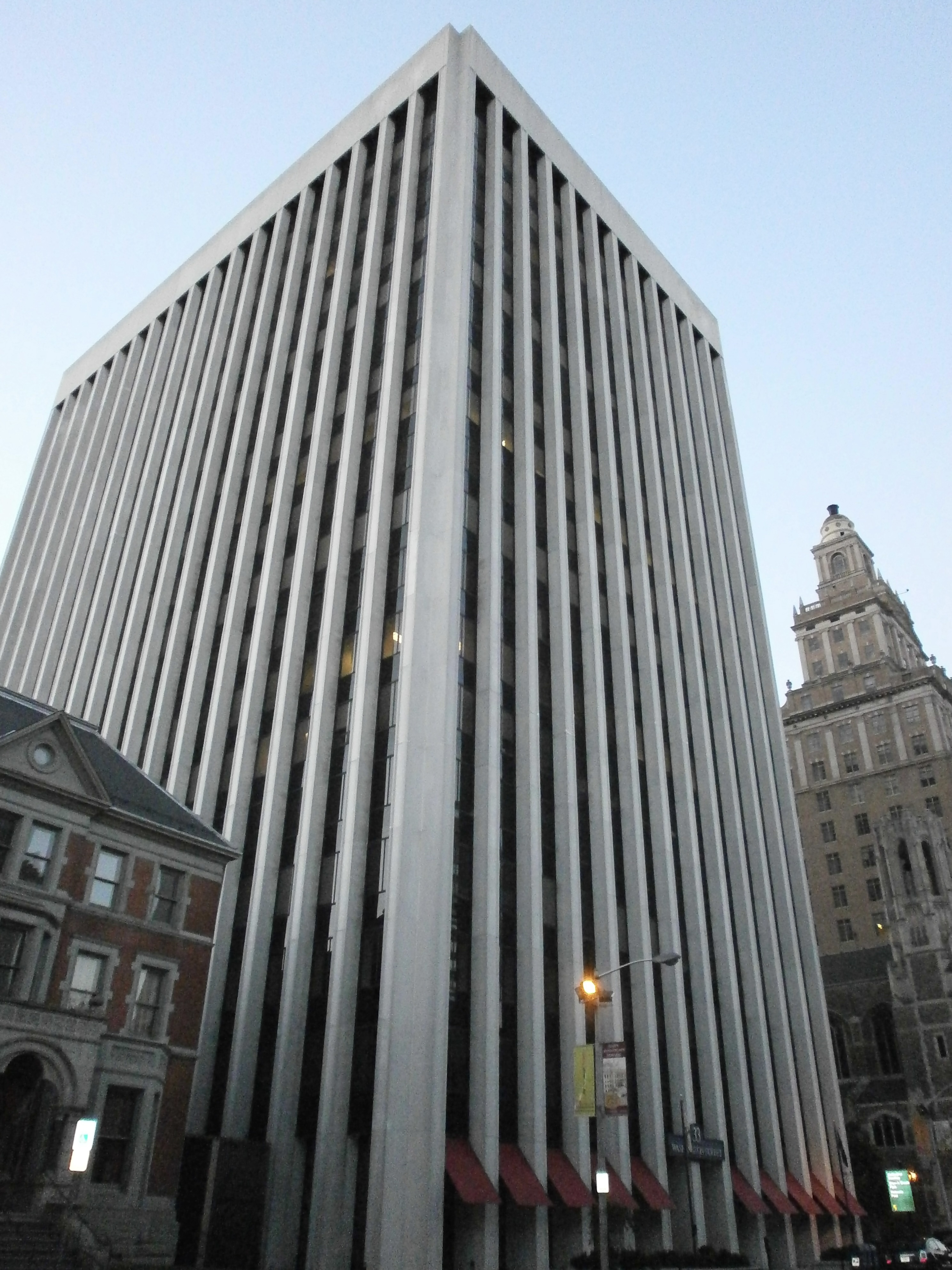
33 Washington Street Newark, New Jersey (1971)

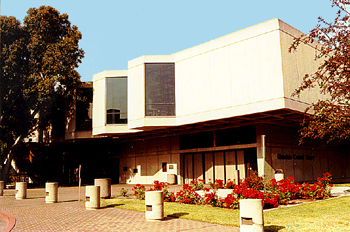
Glendale Central Library (1973)

Becket's works include:

=== Los Angeles ===
- Pan-Pacific Auditorium, 1935 (with Walter Wurdeman) (destroyed by fire)
- General Petroleum Building, 1949 (with Walter Wurdeman)
- Fifth Street Store Building, 1952 renovation
- Welton Becket Residence, 1952
- Ronald Reagan UCLA Medical Center, 1953
- Parker Center (formerly the Police Administration Building), 1955 (demolished)
- The Broadway department store (now Walmart) at Panorama City Shopping Center, 1955
- Capitol Records Building, project designer Lou Naidorf, 1956
- Ace Hotel Los Angeles (formerly the Texaco Building) on Wilshire Boulevard, 1957
- Los Angeles Memorial Sports Arena, 1959 (demolished)
- Los Angeles Customs House and Federal Office Building, 1960 (with Albert C. Martin and Paul R. Williams)
- Airport Marina Hotel, 1961-2 (now Hotel June)
- Petersen Automotive Museum (formerly a Seibu and Ohrbach's department store), 1962
- Los Angeles International Airport interiors, 1962
- McCulloch Building (now Homewood Suites by Hilton LAX), 1962
- Security First National Bank, 1963 (demolished)
- Cinerama Dome, 1963
- Century City masterplan, 1963
- Gateway West Building, 1963
- Westfield Century City (formally Century City Mall), 1964
- Federal Building, 1964
- North American Aviation Building, 1964
- Los Angeles Music Center (officially the Performing Arts Center of Los Angeles County), which includes Dorothy Chandler Pavilion, the Mark Taper Forum, and the Ahmanson Theater, 1964
- Pauley Pavilion (officially the Edwin W. Pauley Pavilion), 1965
- Airport Center Building (now Hyatt Place LAX / Century Blvd), 1965
- 5900 Wilshire, 1968 (with William Pereira)
- Equitable Life Building, 1969
- 800 Wilshire, 1970
- Skyview Center, 1987

=== Greater Los Angeles ===
- Jones Dog & Cat Hospital, West Hollywood, 1938 (with Walter Wurdeman)
- Los Altos Center Mall, Long Beach, 1953
- The Beverly Hilton, Beverly Hills, 1955
- The Broadway Orange County, at the original Anaheim Plaza, Anaheim, 1955 (demolished)
- Santa Monica Civic Auditorium, Santa Monica, 1958
- Orange Civic Center, Orange, 1963
- Mutual Savings and Loan Building, Pasadena, 1964
- Santa Monica Shores Apartments, Santa Monica, 1967
- Fashion Island, Newport Beach, 1967 (with William Pereira)
- La Habra Fashion Square, La Habra, 1968 (Welton Becket and Associates)
- City Hall, Pomona, project designer Marvin Taff, 1969
- Beverly Wilshire Hotel expansion, Beverly Hills, 1971
- Glendale Central Library, Glendale, project designer, Marvin Taff, 1973

=== Elsewhere in California ===
- 100 California Street, San Francisco, 1960
- Kaiser Center, Oakland, 1960
- Grossmont Center, La Mesa, 1961
- Robert McCulloch residence, Palm Springs, 1962
- McKesson Plaza, San Francisco, 1969
- One California, San Francisco, 1969
- One Market Plaza, San Francisco, 1972
- Union Bank Building, San Francisco, 1972
- Wells Fargo Plaza, San Diego, 1983

=== Elsewhere in the US ===
- First National Bank of Arizona Building, Phoenix, 1950
- Baptist Memorial Hospital, Kansas City, Missouri, 1953
- Edens Plaza, Wilmette, Illinois, 1956
- Park Central Mall, Phoenix, 1956
- Sheraton Dallas Hotel (formerly the Adams Mark Dallas and Southland Center), Dallas, 1959
- Riviera Hotel and Casino expansion, Las Vegas, 1959 (demolished)
- Clark County Courthouse, Las Vegas, 1961 (with Zick & Sharp)
- Christown Mall, Phoenix, 1961
- Walt Whitman Shops, Huntington Station, New York, 1962
- Biltmore Fashion Park, Phoenix, 1963
- Hartford National Bank, Hartford, Connecticut, 1963
- ExxonMobil Building (formerly Humble Oil Building) Houston, 1963
- McCarran International Airport, Las Vegas, 1963
- Phillips Petroleum Building, Bartlesville, Oklahoma, 1964
- Ford Pavilion of the 1964 New York World's Fair, Queens, New York, 1964 (demolished)
- General Electric Pavilion of the 1964 New York World's Fair, Queens, 1964 (demolished)
- Gulf Life Tower (now known as the Riverplace Tower), Jacksonville, Florida, 1967
- Xerox Tower, Rochester, New York, 1967
- Park Plaza Shopping Center, Oshkosh, Wisconsin, 1969
- Park Plaza Mall, Oshkosh, 1970, now City Center a commercial business center for Oshkosh
- PNC Plaza (formerly the Citizens Fidelity Plaza), Louisville, Kentucky, 1971
- Disney's Contemporary Resort, Lake Buena Vista, Florida, 1971
- Worcester Center, Worcester, Massachusetts, 1971
- 33 Washington Street, Newark, New Jersey, 1971
- Chase Tower (formerly the Bank One Center and Valley Bank Center), Phoenix, project designer MacDonald Becket, 1972
- Grand Ole Opry House, Nashville, 1972
- Hyatt Regency, Knoxville, Tennessee, 1972
- Nassau Veterans Memorial Coliseum, Uniondale, New York, 1972
- One PNC Plaza, Pittsburgh, Pennsylvania, 1972
- Regions Center (formerly the AmSouth Center, AmSouth-Sonat Tower, and First National-Southern Natural Building), Birmingham, Alabama, 1972
- Brady Sullivan Plaza, (formerly Hampshire Plaza), Manchester, New Hampshire, 1973
- Chase Plaza, Lexington, Kentucky, 1973
- 100 Summer Street, Boston, 1974
- United Plaza, Philadelphia, 1974
- Hyatt Regency New Orleans, New Orleans, Louisiana, 1976
- Reunion Tower, Dallas, 1978
- Hyatt Regency Hotel, Dallas, 1978
- Hyatt Regency Hotel, Washington, D.C., 1978
- Hyatt Regency Hotel, Louisville, 1978
- US Bank Plaza, Boise, Idaho, 1978
- BNY Mellon Center, Pittsburgh, 1980
- Motorola Communications Group Building, Schaumburg, IL, 1980
- One Tampa City Center (formerly the GTE Building) Tampa, Florida, 1981
- Stanton Tower, El Paso, Texas, 1981
- OneOK Plaza, Tulsa, Oklahoma, 1984 (with HKS, Inc.)
- First Bank and Trust Tower, New Orleans, 1987

=== International ===
- Manila Jai Alai Building, Manila, Philippines, 1939 (with Walter Wurdeman), (demolished)
- Hotel Tryp Habana Libre (formerly the Habana Hilton), Havana, Cuba, 1958
- The Nile Ritz-Carlton, Cairo (formerly the Nile Hilton), Cairo, Egypt, 1959 (with Mahmoud Riad)
- Southern Cross Hotel, Melbourne, Australia, 1962 (demolished 2003)
- U.S. Embassy, Warsaw, Poland, 1963
- Intourist Hotel, Moscow, 1976
