= Westfield Century City =

Shopping mall in Los Angeles, California

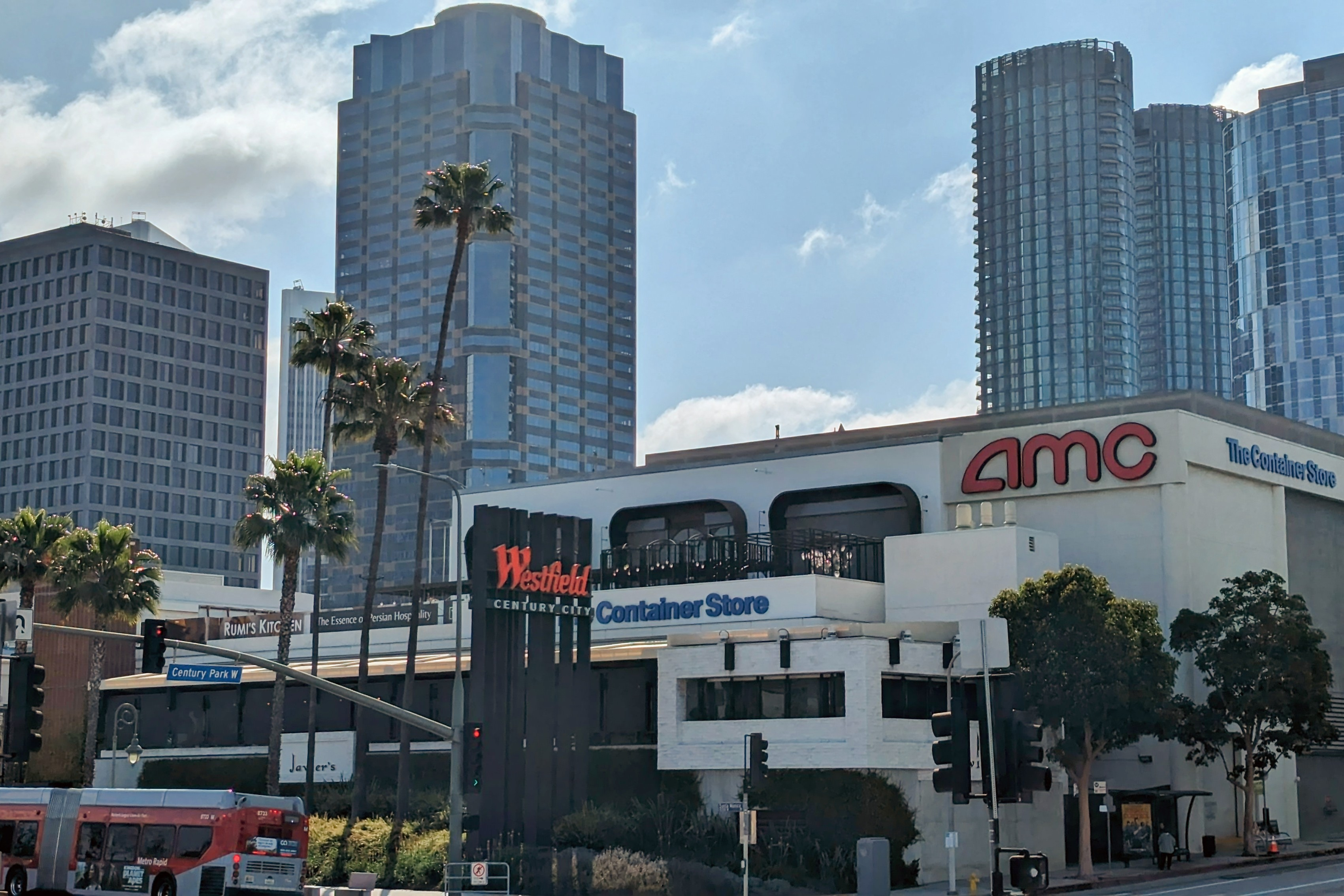
- Northwest facade of the Westfield Century City Mall facing Santa Monica Boulevard
- Location: Los Angeles, California, U.S.
- Coordinates: 34.05865°N 118.41903°W
- Address: 10250 Santa Monica Blvd., Los Angeles, CA 90067
- Opened: 1964; 62 years ago
- Previous names: Century Square Shopping Center (1964–2002); Westfield Shoppingtown Century City (2002–2005)
- Developer: Del E. Webb Construction Company
- Manager: Unibail-Rodamco-Westfield
- Owner: Unibail-Rodamco-Westfield
- Architect: Welton Becket Associates
- Num. of stores: about 200
- Num. of anchor tenants: 5
- Floor area: 1,300,000 sq ft (120,000 m^{2})
- Floors: 2
- Parking: about 3,500 spaces
- Website: www.westfield.com/united-states/centurycity

Westfield Century City is an outdoor shopping mall in the Century City neighborhood of Los Angeles, California. It has 1,300,000 square feet (120,000 m^{2}) of gross leasable area and is anchored by Bloomingdale's, Macy's, and Nordstrom. The mall has been owned by Westfield-affiliated companies since 2002, and has been owned by the Unibail-Rodamco-Westfield since 2017.

== History ==
The Century Square Shopping Center opened in 1964, anchored by The Broadway. In 1976, an expansion was built on the site of the outdoor parking lot, adding a Bullock's anchor store and several other new retail stores. An AMC cinema and "The Marketplace", a food court, were added in 1987. In 1996, Broadway Stores, Inc. was acquired by Federated Department Stores, which converted The Broadway into Bloomingdale's and Bullock's into Macy's.

Australian shopping center developer Westfield Group acquired a 50% stake in the shopping center in 2002 and renamed it Westfield Shoppingtown Century City. The Shoppingtown moniker was dropped from all Westfield properties in 2005, and the mall became Westfield Century City.

In 2004, Westfield initiated a $160 million renovation. The renovation replaced the 1980s-era food court and movie theater with an alfresco Dining Terrace and a flagship 15-screen AMC cinema. The renovation also brought a new two-level retail building housing a Borders bookstore and a Container Store on the top level and numerous retailers on the bottom, a reskin of the existing Bloomingdale's store, the addition of a restaurant row facing Santa Monica Boulevard, and a general remodeling of the center. Borders went out of business in 2011.

=== Expansion ===
In 2009, a radical expansion and renovation of Westfield Century City was approved. The original plans for the expansion called for a 49-story residential and office building with a relocated Bloomingdale's at the base, the addition of more than 350,000 square feet of retail space, and more than 1,000 new parking spaces. Ten stories were eliminated from the proposed building at the behest of Century City residents.

After years of delays, lawsuits, and neighborhood protests, a revamped expansion plan was unveiled in 2013. After further tweaking, the expansion was approved and commenced construction in 2015. The oldest portions of the property, including the Welton Becket–designed Gateway West Building and Macy's, were razed and replaced with new two-level and three-level retail buildings. A planned residential tower was removed from the project to make way for additional retail, which now numbered more than 1.3 million square feet. The first phase of the project, including the new Macy's anchor store, opened on April 6, 2017. The second major phase, including Nordstrom, opened to the public on October 3, 2017.

The final piece of the $1 billion project, Italian food marketplace Eataly, opened on November 3, 2017.

In April 2022, Unibail-Rodamco-Westfield announced their plan to sell all 24 malls in the United States within 2 years.

In May 2022, new incentive toy store, which is Camp, have opened in this shopping mall.

== See also ==
- Westfield Group
