= McKesson Plaza =

38-story skyscraper located at 1 Post Street and Market Street in San Francisco

One Post Street
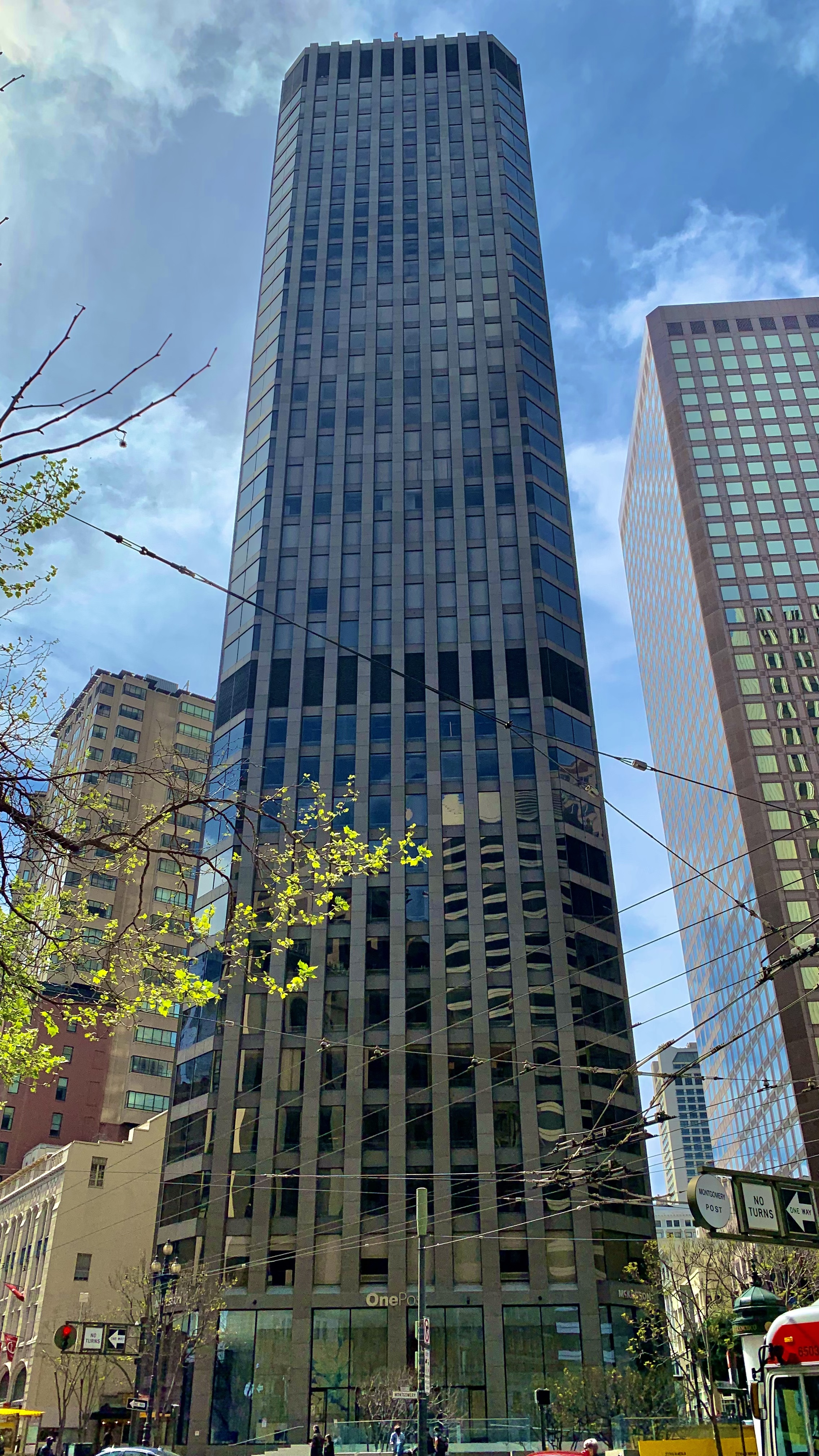
- Seen from Post Street

- Location within San Francisco
- Former names: McKesson Plaza; Aetna Life & Casualty Building; Crocker Plaza Building

General information
- Type: Commercial offices
- Location: 1 Post Street; San Francisco, California, United States
- Coordinates: 37.7887°N 122.4026°W
- Completed: 1969
- Owner: Brookfield Properties
- Operator: JLL

Height
- Roof: 161 m (528 ft)

Technical details
- Floor count: 38
- Floor area: 389,654 sq ft (36,200.0 m^{2})

Design and construction
- Architects: Welton Becket & Associates; SWA Group (landscape)
- Developer: Universal Land Company and Crocker Land Company
- Main contractor: Dinwiddie Construction

One Post Street is a 38-story, 529 ft (161 m) office skyscraper located at 1 Post Street and Market Street in the Financial District of San Francisco, California, United States. The building is owned by Brookfield Properties. It served as headquarters for the McKesson Corporation until April 2019.

Designed by architect Welton Becket, the building exemplified his penchant for repetitive geometric patterns and walls clad in natural stone. Landscape architect SWA Group's design for the busy triangular/flatiron site created an octagonal, two-tiered opening leading to the Montgomery Street Bay Area Rapid Transit station, and flanked by trees, shops and a series of granite steps used for seating.

In the soap opera The Young and the Restless, the building is featured as "Lakeview Towers", where numerous characters — beginning in 2012 with Victor Newman — have lived in either of two adjoining penthouse apartments.

== History ==
The Crocker flatiron building was located at One Post Street, which was demolished by 1969 and replaced with McKesson Plaza.

== See also ==
- List of tallest buildings in San Francisco
