= Albert C. Martin Jr. =

American architect

- Born: August 3, 1913; Los Angeles, California, USA
- Died: March 30, 2006 (aged 92); San Luis Obispo, California, USA
- Education: USC School of Architecture
- Occupation: Architect
- Buildings: St. Basil Catholic Church

Albert Carey Martin Jr. FAIA (August 3, 1913 – March 30, 2006) was an American architect. He carried on the legacy of his architect father, Albert C. Martin. The Los Angeles firm they established is known as AC Martin Partners.

== Biography ==
=== Early life ===
Albert Carey Martin Jr. was born on August 3, 1913, in Los Angeles, California. He graduated from the USC School of Architecture.

=== Career ===
He started his career at his father's firm in 1936 along with his brother, J. Edward Martin (October 23, 1916 – November 22, 2004), a structural engineer who assumed management of the firm after World War II.

His firm designed the Los Angeles Department of Water and Power Building. Martin used various styles from a "Rationalist International language" to more Expressionist designs. He and his brother slowly turned over control of the firm to Albert's son, David C. Martin (born October 7, 1942), and Edward's son, Christopher C. Martin (born June 19, 1950), between 1984 and 1990.

According to the Los Angeles Times, the firm was credited for "more than 50 percent of all the major buildings erected in Downtown Los Angeles since World War II."

Martin designed Union Bank Plaza, a landmark skyscraper in Los Angeles. This 42-story office tower was the first building in the city taller than L.A. City Hall, which his father helped to design. Built in the International Style, Union Bank Plaza was completed in 1966.

He was a fellow of the American Institute of Architects and was chosen by the USC School of Architecture as its distinguished alumnus of 1990. He was a sailing enthusiast and raced at least five times in the trans-Pacific to Hawaii competition.

=== Death ===
He died on March 30, 2006, in San Luis Obispo, California.

== Firm's architectural work during Martin Jr.'s tenure ==
- Los Angeles Department of Water and Power Building at 111 North Hope Street (1965)
- Union Bank Plaza on Figueroa Street (1967)
- One Space Park, the TRW science research park in Redondo Beach (1968)
- St. Basil Catholic Church on Wilshire Boulevard (1969)
- 1900 Avenue of the Stars, Century City, Los Angeles (1970).
- ARCO Plaza Towers, identical 52-story towers on South Flower Street (1973)
- ARCO Plaza on South Flower Street (1973)
- Security Pacific Bank Plaza on South Flower Street (1975)
