= Century City =

- Neighborhood of Los Angeles
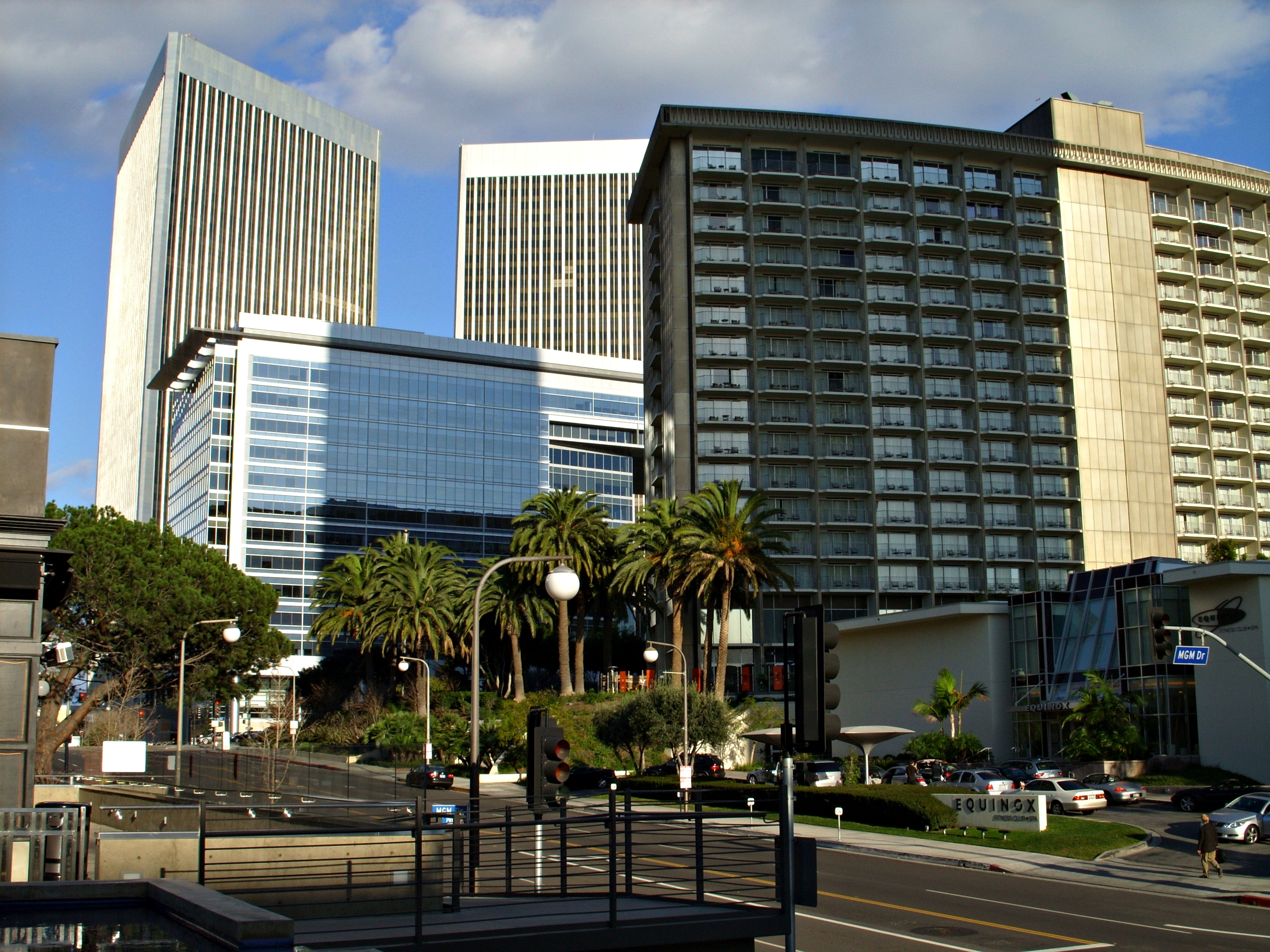
- Century City in 2009

- Location of Century City in West Los Angeles
- Coordinates: 34°03′20″N 118°25′01″W
- Country: United States
- State: California
- County: Los Angeles
- City: Los Angeles
- Named for: 20th Century Fox
- Elevation: 289 ft (88 m)
- Time zone: UTC-8 (PST)
  - Summer (DST): UTC-7 (PDT)
- ZIP Code: 90067
- Area codes: 310, 424

Century City is a 176-acre (71.2 ha) neighborhood and business district in central Los Angeles, California, United States. Located on the Westside to the south of Santa Monica Boulevard around 10 miles (16 km) west of downtown Los Angeles, Century City is one of the most prominent employment centers in the Los Angeles metropolitan area and its skyscrapers form a distinctive skyline along the city's westside.

The district was developed on the former backlot of 20th Century Fox—the film studio from which the district partially derived its name—and its first building was opened in 1963. Important to the economy are the Westfield Century City shopping center, business towers and the Fox Studio Lot.

== History ==
Avenue of the Stars in Century City in 1978

The land of Century City belonged to cowboy actor Tom Mix (1880–1940), who used it as a ranch. It later became a backlot of the former 20th Century Fox film studio, which still has its headquarters just to the southwest.

In 1956, Spyros Skouras (1893–1971), who served as the President of the former 20th Century Fox from 1942 until 1962, and his nephew-in-law Edmond Herrscher (died 1983), an attorney sometimes known as "the father of Century City", decided to repurpose the land for real estate development. The following year, in 1957, they commissioned a master-plan development from Welton Becket Associates, which was unveiled at a major press event on the "western" backlot later that year.

In 1961, after Fox suffered a string of expensive flops, culminating with the financial strain put on the studio by the very expensive production of Cleopatra, the film studio sold about 180 acres (0.73 km^{2}) to developer William Zeckendorf and Aluminum Co. of America, also known as Alcoa, for US$54 million (US$533 million in 2023 money) who had plans for a $300 million (3 billion 2023) development. Herrscher had encouraged his uncle-in-law to borrow money instead, but once Skouras refused, he was out of the picture.

The new owners conceived Century City as "a city within a city". In 1963, the first building, Gateway West Building, was completed. The next year, in 1964, Minoru Yamasaki designed the Century Plaza Hotel. Five years later, in 1969, architects Anthony J. Lumsden and César Pelli designed the Century City Medical Plaza.

== Geography ==
According to the City of Los Angeles Department of City Planning, Century City constitutes census tract 2679.01.

Century City is generally bounded by Santa Monica Boulevard to the north, the city of Beverly Hills to the east, Pico Boulevard to the south, and Century Park West to the west (including the west side of Century Park West between Santa Monica Boulevard and Constellation Boulevard). These boundaries correspond with those recognized by the Century City Business Improvement District Association.

Neighboring Century City are Beverly Hills to the east, Cheviot Hills to the south, West Los Angeles to the west, and Westwood to the north.

=== Mapping L.A. ===
The Mapping L.A. project of the Los Angeles Times extends Century City's western boundary to Beverly Glen Boulevard. However, this more expansive definition is not consistent with other L.A. Times reports: a 1999 article sets Century Park West as Century City's western boundary, and a 2017 article refers to the neighborhood to the west of Century City (between Century Park West and Beverly Glen Boulevard) as distinct from it.

=== Climate ===
Climate data for Century City, Los Angeles
Month	Jan	Feb	Mar	Apr	May	Jun	Jul	Aug	Sep	Oct	Nov	Dec	Year
Mean daily maximum °F (°C)	67 (19)	68 (20)	69 (21)	72 (22)	72 (22)	76 (24)	80 (27)	81 (27)	80 (27)	77 (25)	72 (22)	68 (20)	74 (23)
Mean daily minimum °F (°C)	48 (9)	49 (9)	50 (10)	53 (12)	56 (13)	59 (15)	62 (17)	63 (17)	62 (17)	58 (14)	52 (11)	48 (9)	55 (13)
Average precipitation inches (mm)	3.36 (85)	3.62 (92)	2.92 (74)	0.65 (17)	0.28 (7.1)	0.07 (1.8)	0.02 (0.51)	0.10 (2.5)	0.17 (4.3)	0.41 (10)	1.07 (27)	2.00 (51)	14.65 (372)

== Demographics ==
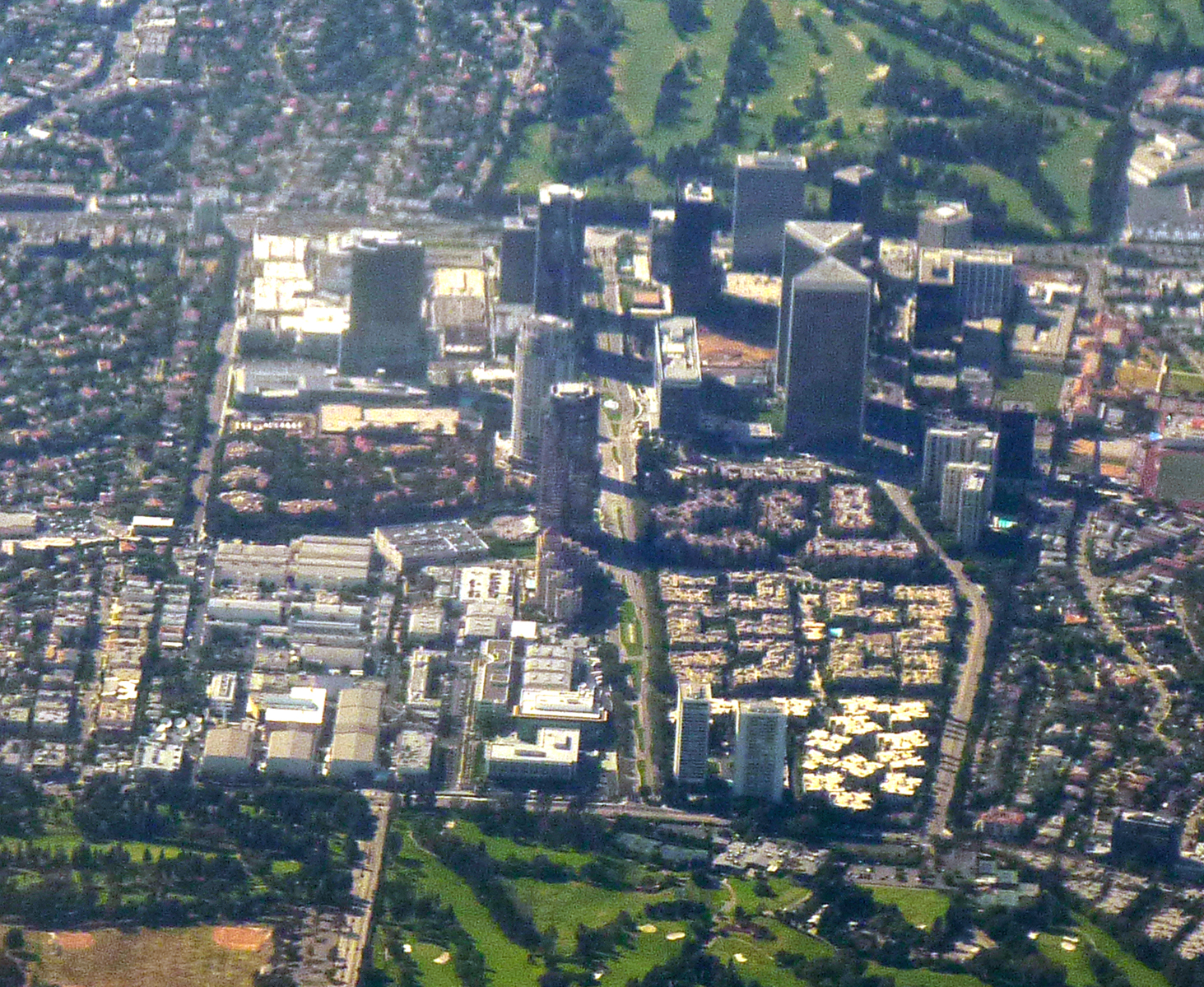
A 2009 aerial view of Century City with the Fox Studio Lot visible in the lower left

Century City makes up census tract 2679.01, which is 0.4 square miles. The 2000 U.S. Census counted 2,428 residents and 1,812 housing units, for an average of 1.34 persons per household.

The 2017 American Community Survey estimated a population of 2,235 in Century City, or 5,170.1 people per square mile, and 1,929 housing units. Per capita income was $148,638 and median household income was $123,889.

=== Mapping L.A. data ===
The following data apply to Century City within the boundaries set by Mapping L.A.:

In 2008, the median age for residents was 46, older than average for the city and the county. The percentage of residents aged 65 and older (26.4%) was the highest for any neighborhood in Los Angeles County. The percentages of widowed men and women and of divorced men were among the county's highest. Military veterans accounted for 11.9% of the population, a high rate for the city and the county.

The breakdown was whites, 82.5%; Asians, 8.6%; Latinos, 4.4%; blacks, 1.4%; and others, 3,0%. Iran (21.2%) and Canada (6.1%) were the most common places of birth for the 25.5% of the residents who were born abroad—a low percentage, compared to the city at large.

The median yearly income in 2014 was $95,135, a high figure for Los Angeles. The percentage of households that earned $125,000 and up was high for Los Angeles County. The average household size of 1.8 people was low for Los Angeles. Renters occupied 39.6% of the housing stock and apartment owners held 60.4%.

== Economy ==
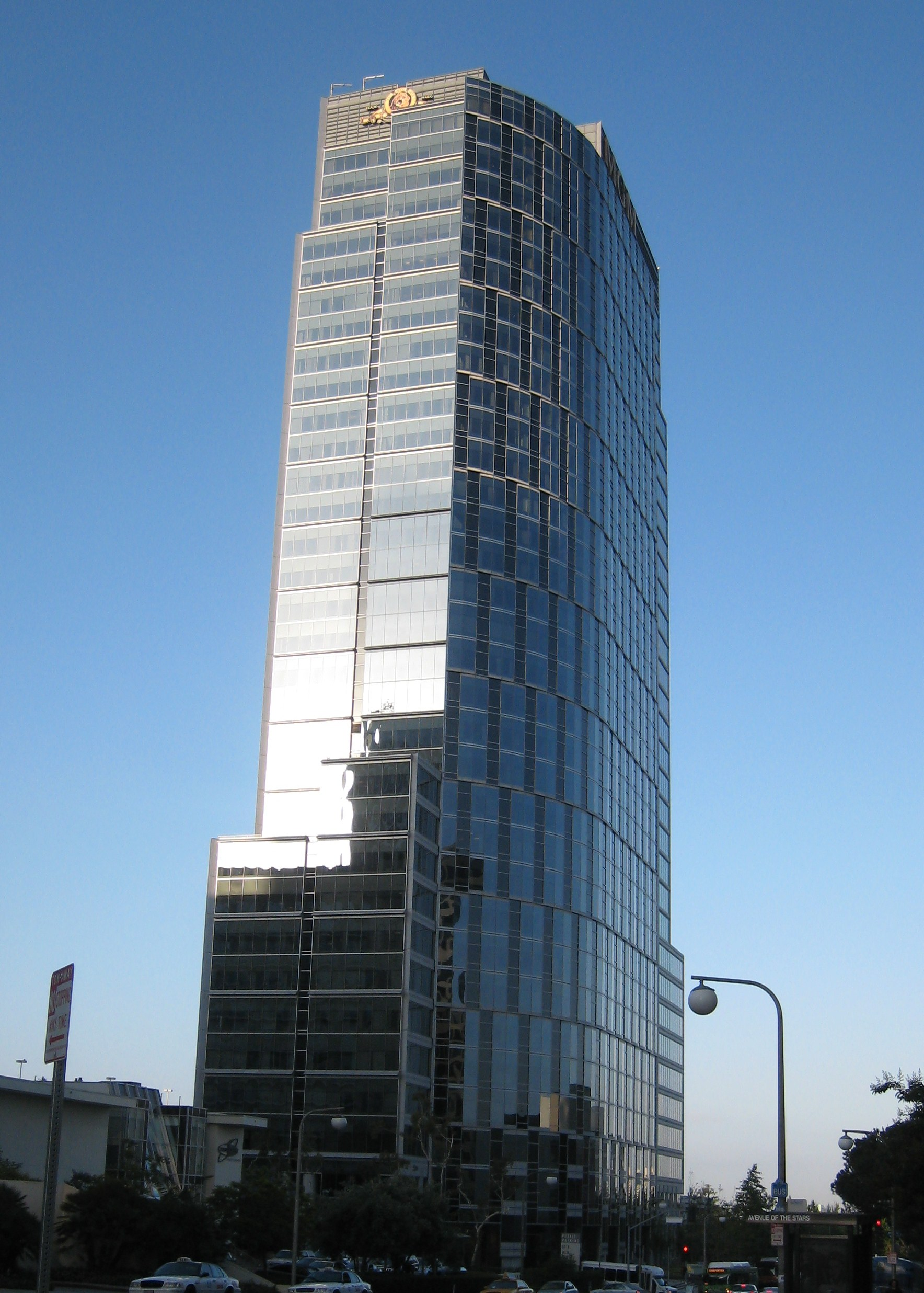
Constellation Place, formerly MGM Tower, in Century City

Westfield Century City and Fox Studios occupy considerable acreage in the neighborhood. Westfield Century City underwent an $800 million renovation and expansion aiming to maintain the center's status as one of the Westside's premier shopping and entertainment destinations.

One tower, Constellation Place (formerly the MGM Tower), has the headquarters of Houlihan Lokey, ICM Partners, and International Lease Finance Corporation. Crystal Cruises is also headquartered in Century City along with haircare manufacturer, John Paul Mitchell Systems.

== Government and infrastructure ==
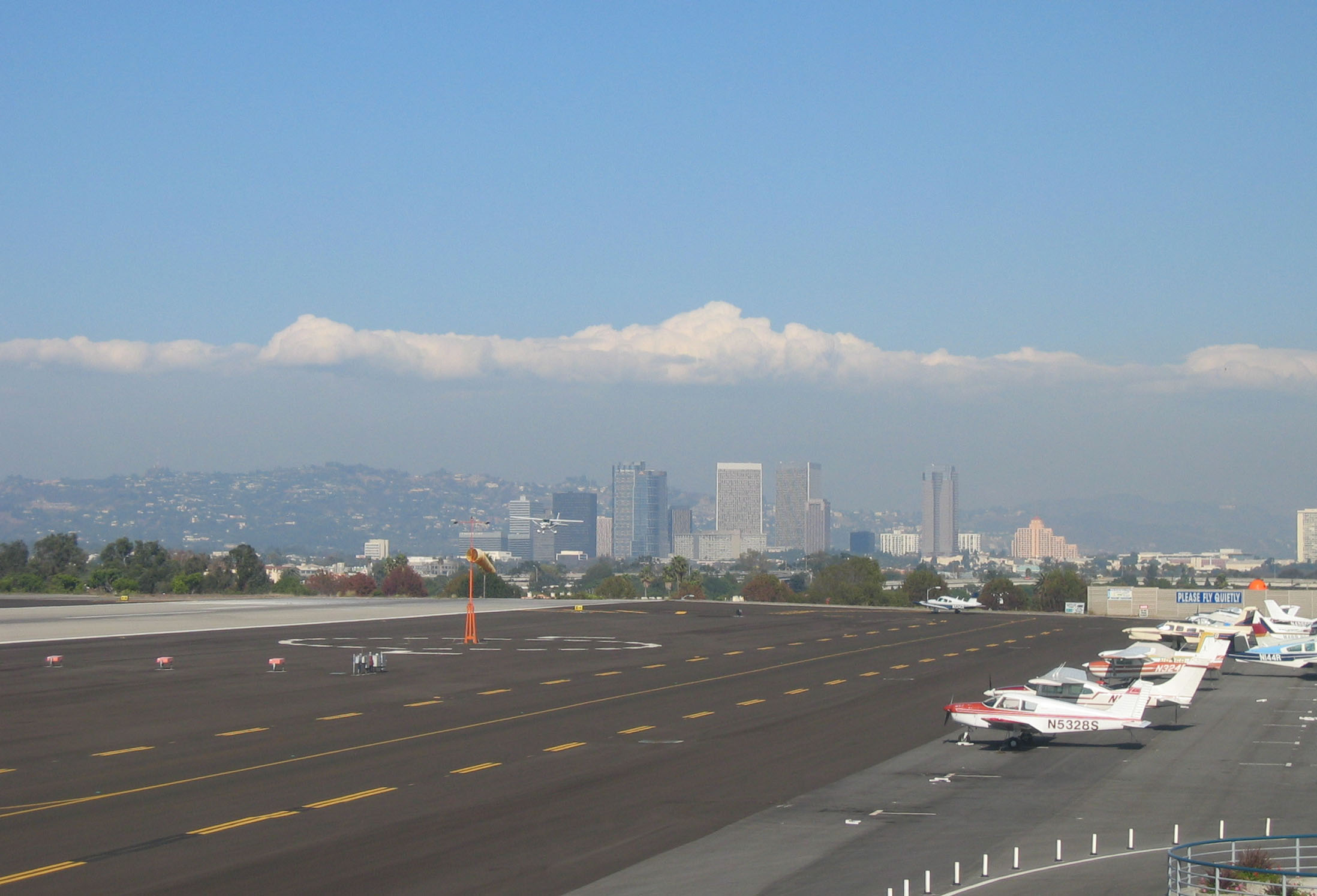
Santa Monica Airport facing east toward Century City

The Los Angeles County Department of Health Services SPA 5 West Area Health Office serves Century City.

Los Angeles Fire Department Station 92 is the assigned fire station for the district. The Los Angeles Police Department operates the West Los Angeles Community Police Station at 1663 Butler Avenue, 90025, serving the neighborhood.

Santa Monica Airport is nearby. Major roads including Santa Monica Boulevard, Pico Boulevard, the Santa Monica Freeway (I-10), and the San Diego Freeway (I-405) are all located next to Century City. Olympic Boulevard goes through Century City.

Section 2 of the D Line Extension, set to open in 2026, will add a subway station on the D Line at the intersection of Avenue of the Stars and Constellation Boulevard, in the heart of Century City.

== Education ==
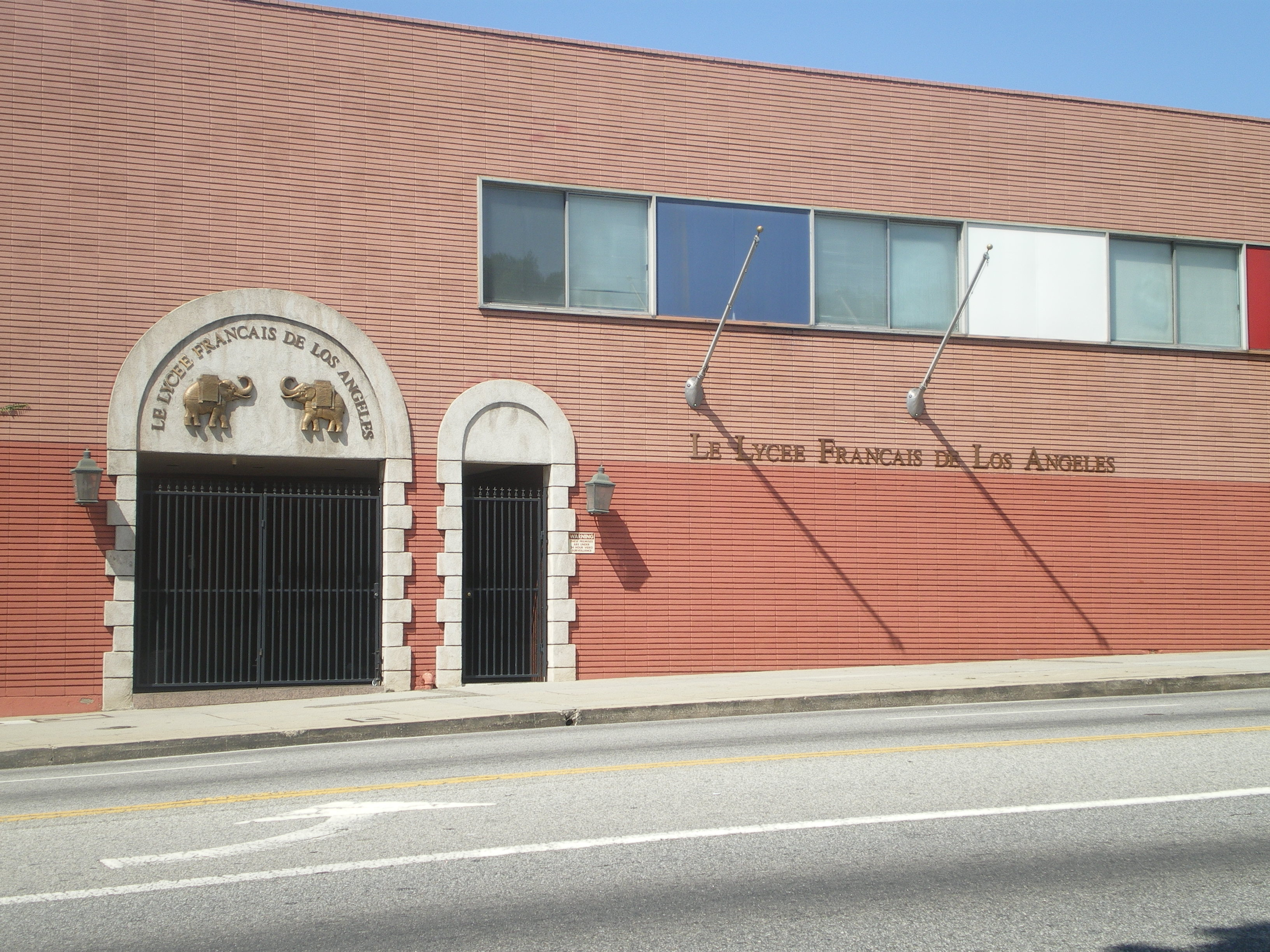
The Century City campus of Lycée Français de Los Angeles in March 2008

Fifty-five percent of Century City residents aged 25 or over had earned a four-year degree by 2000; this is a high figure for Los Angeles.

Los Angeles Unified School District is the school district of Century City.

Three private schools are located in or near Century City: VINCI Academy Daycare & Preschool, at 1940 Century Park East; Lycée Français de Los Angeles, at 10361 Pico Boulevard; and Temple Isaiah Preschool and Kindergarten, at 10345 West Pico Boulevard.

There are also two public schools located near Century City in Westwood: Westwood Charter Elementary School and Emerson Community Charter Middle School. These are both schools part of the Los Angeles Unified School District.

== Gallery ==
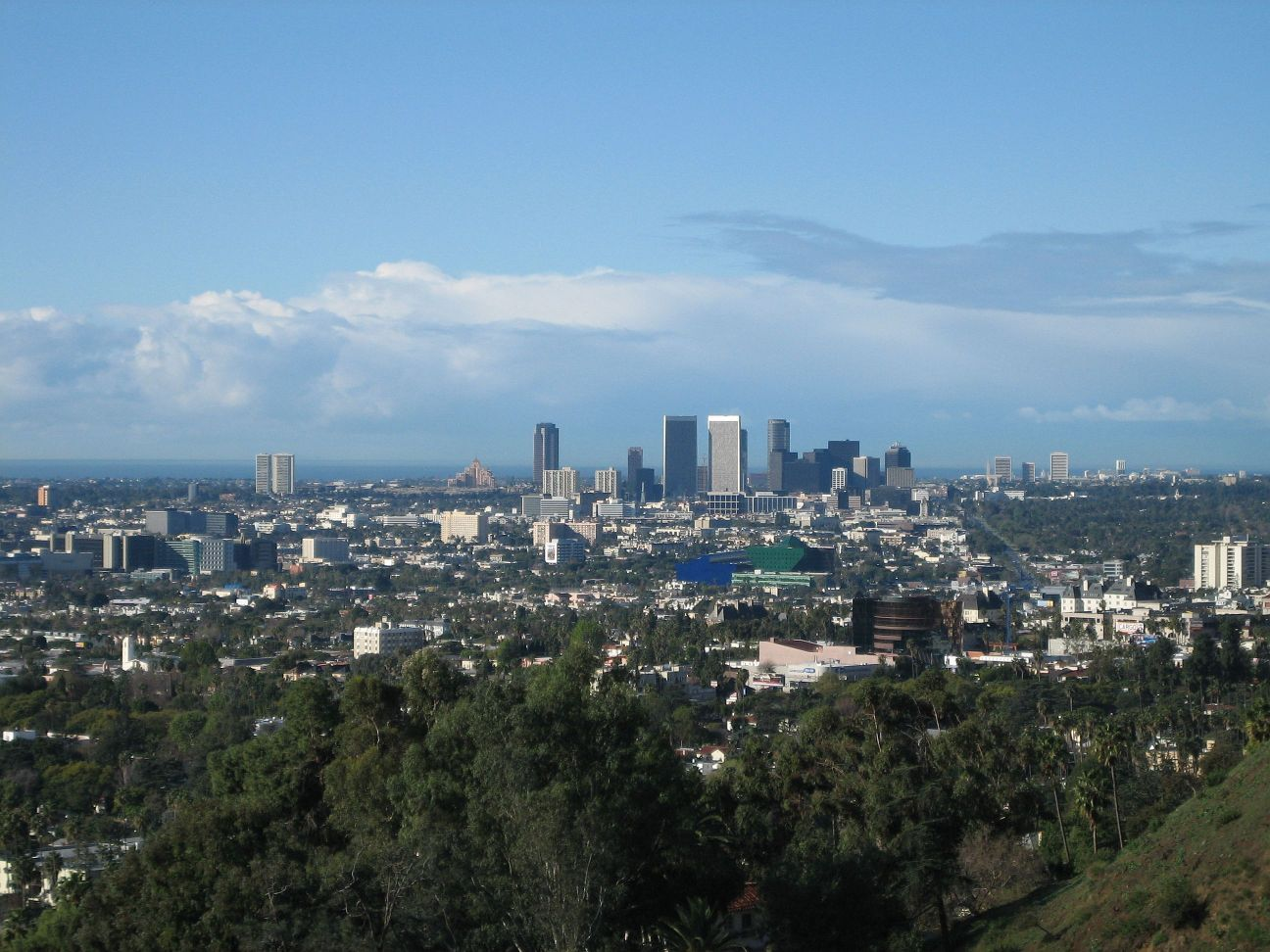
Century City skyline as seen from Runyon Canyon Park in February 2006

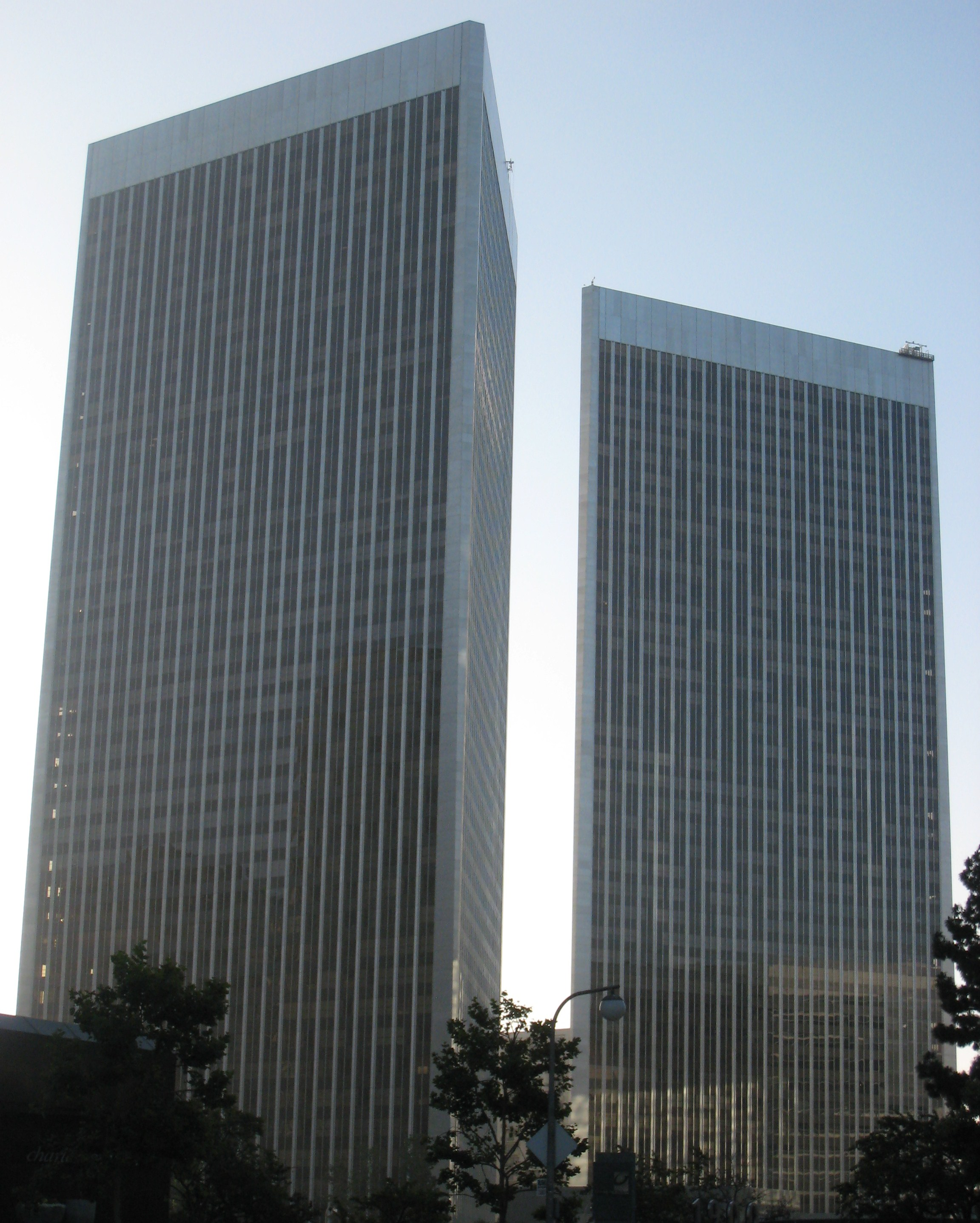
Century Plaza Towers

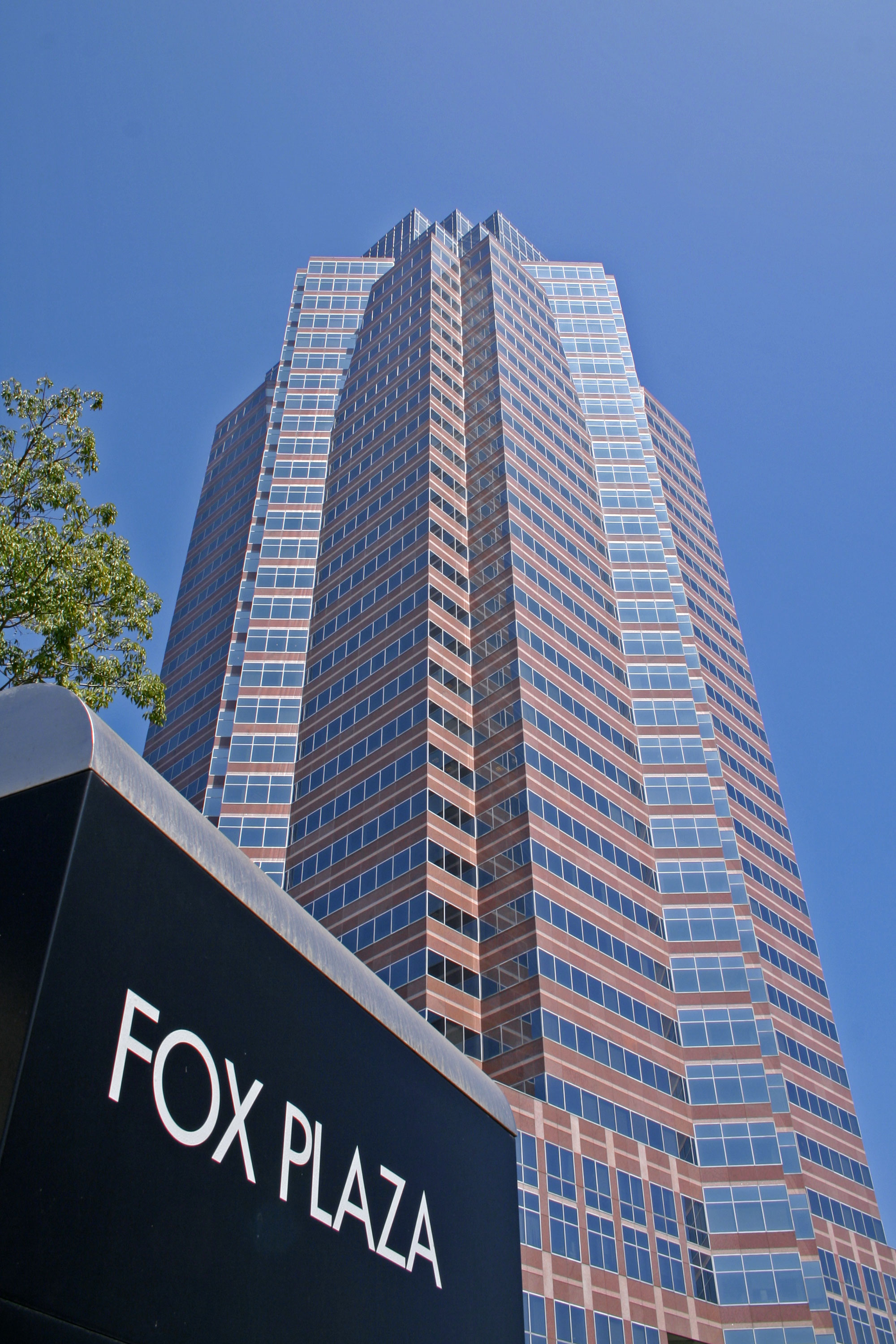
Fox Plaza

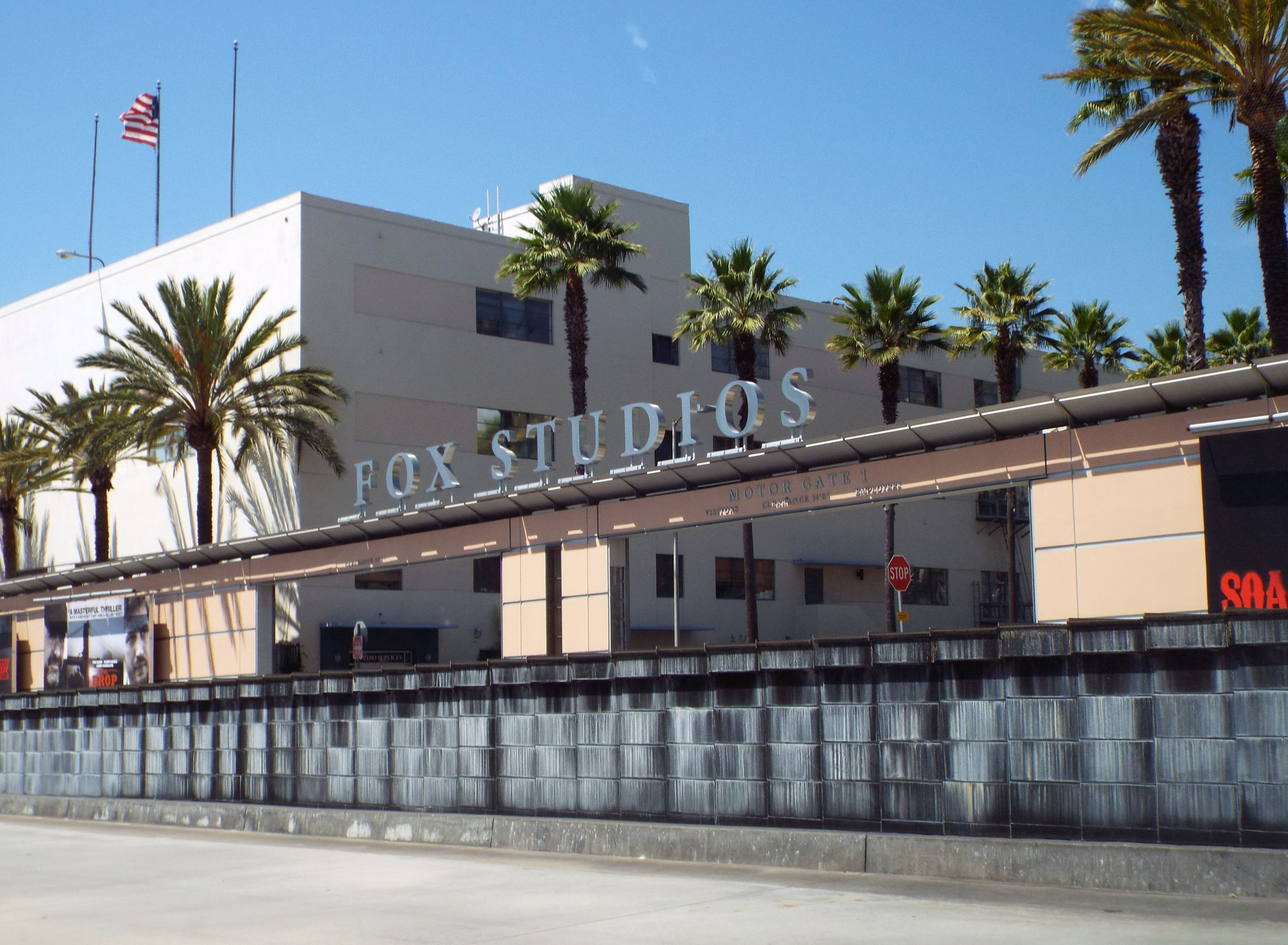
Fox Studio Lot

== Sister cities ==
- Doncaster, Victoria, Australia

== See also ==
- 1967 Century City anti-Vietnam War march
